= Robert Koch Medal and Award =

Science award

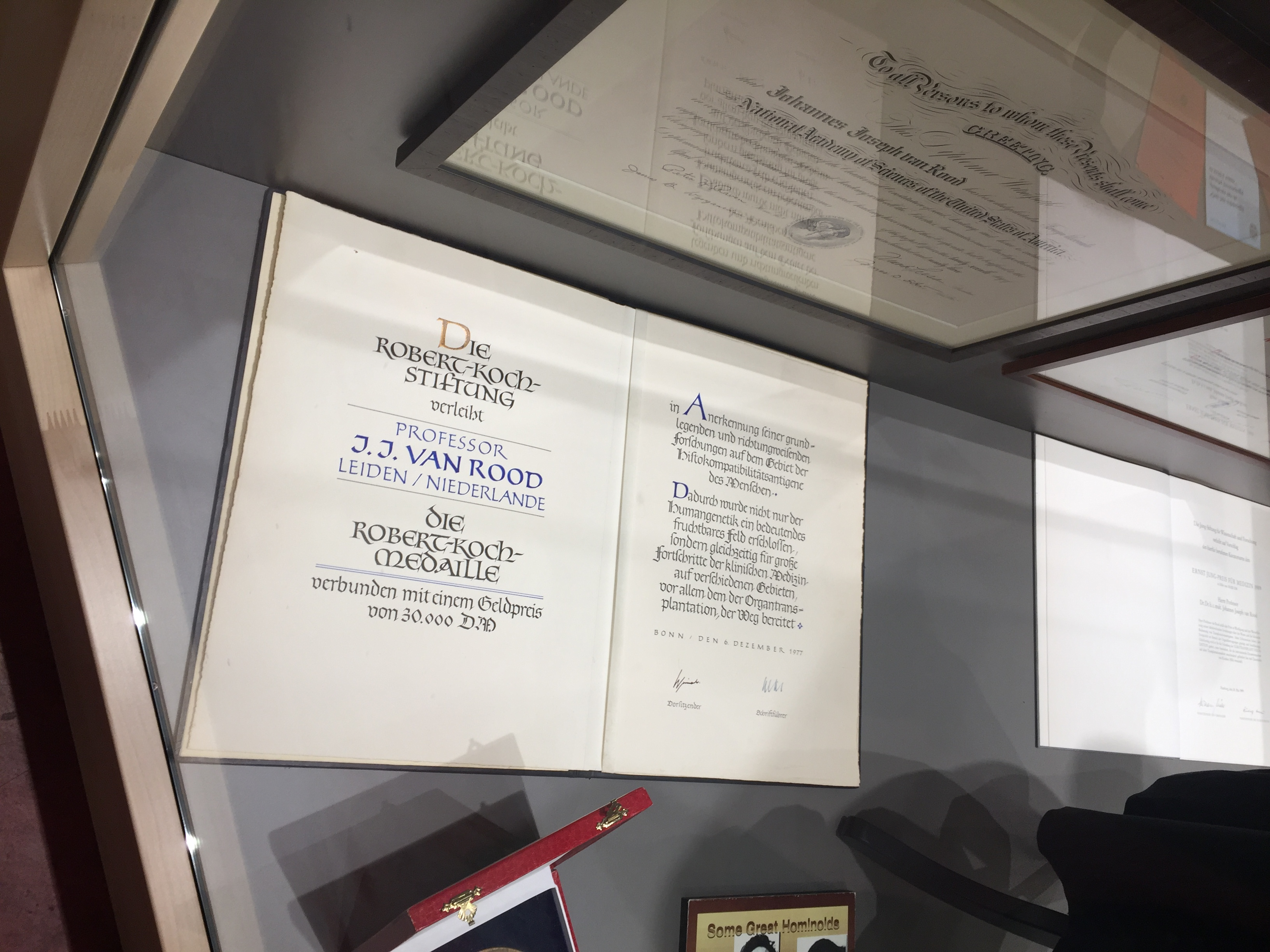
Robert Koch Medal 1977, Jon van Rood

The Robert Koch Medal and Award are two prizes awarded annually by the German Robert Koch Foundation for excellence in the biomedical sciences. These awards grew out of early attempts by German physician Robert Koch to generate funding to support his research into the cause and cure for tuberculosis. Koch discovered the bacteria (Mycobacterium tuberculosis) responsible for the dreaded disease and rapidly acquired international support, including 500,000 gold marks from the Scottish-American philanthropist Andrew Carnegie.

== The Robert Koch Prize ==
Since 1970, the Robert Koch Foundation has awarded prizes for major advances in the biomedical sciences, particularly in the fields of microbiology and immunology. The prestige of this award has grown over the past decades so that it is now widely regarded as the leading international scientific prize in microbiology. As has been described by a jury member for the prize, the committee often asks, "What would Robert Koch work on today?” to decide on research that should be granted recognition.

The more specific Robert Koch Prize is commonly considered one of the stepping-stones (along with other prizes such as the Lasker Award) to eventual Nobel Prize recognition for scientists in the fields of microbiology and immunology, and a number of Robert Koch Prize winners subsequently became Nobel laureates, such as César Milstein, Susumu Tonegawa and Harald zur Hausen. Other notable awardees include Albert Sabin, Jonas Salk and John Enders for their pioneering work on the development of polio vaccines. Only Enders was recognized with a Nobel Prize, together with Thomas Huckle Weller and Frederick Chapman Robbins.

Two separate Robert Koch Awards are presented annually: The Gold Robert Koch Gold Medal for accumulated excellence in biomedical research and the Robert Koch Prize, worth €120,000, for a major discovery in biomedical science.

== Robert Koch Prize Winners since 1960 ==
- 1960 Hugo Braun (Germany), René Dubos (USA), Toshiaki Ebina (Japan), Ludwig Heilmeyer (Germany), Franz Redeker (Germany), Josef Tomczik (Switzerland)
- 1962 John Franklin Enders (USA), Albert Sabin (USA), Jonas Salk (USA)
- 1963 Tomizo Yoshida (Japan)
- 1965 Gertrud Meißner
- 1966 Karl Bartmann
- 1968 Heinz Stolp, Arthur Brockhaus, Hans-Werner Schlipköter
- 1970 William M. Hutchison (United Kingdom), Pirjo Mäkelä (Finland), Jørgen C. Siim (Denmark)
- 1971 Gertrude Henle and Werner Henle (USA)
- 1972 Lubertus Berrens (Netherlands), Alain de Weck (Switzerland)
- 1973 Jean Lindenmann (Switzerland), Hans Gerhard Schwick (Germany)
- 1974 Norbert Hilschmann (Germany)
- 1975 Harald zur Hausen (Germany), Heinz-G. Wittmann (Germany)
- 1976 Richard A. Finkelstein (USA), Mark Richmond (United Kingdom)
- 1977 Jean Dausset (France), Jon J. van Rood (Netherlands)
- 1978 Albrecht Kleinschmidt (Germany), Heinz Ludwig Sänger (Germany)
- 1979 Ruth Arnon (Israel), Peter Starlinger (Germany)
- 1980 César Milstein (Argentina), Lewis W. Wannamaker (USA)
- 1981 Robert M. Chanock (USA), Lars Å. Hanson (Sweden)
- 1982 Raymond L. Erikson (USA), Franz Oesch (Germany)
- 1983 Werner Goebel (Germany), Robert A. Weinberg (USA)
- 1984 Walter Doerfler (Germany), Stuart F. Schlossman (USA)
- 1985 Stefania Jabłońska (Poland), Gérard Orth (France)
- 1986 Susumu Tonegawa (Japan)
- 1987 Mario Rizzetto (Italy), Rodulf Rott (Germany), John Skehel (United Kingdom)
- 1988 Donald Metcalf (Australia)
- 1989 Irun R. Cohen (Israel), Alex J. van der Eb (Netherlands)
- 1990 Lloyd J. Old (USA)
- 1991 Walter Fiers (Belgium), Tadatsugu Taniguchi (Japan)
- 1992 Kary B. Mullis (USA)
- 1993 Hans-Georg Rammensee (Germany), Daniel W. Bradley (USA), Michael Houghton (USA)
- 1994 Volkmar Braun (Germany), Manuel Elkin Patarroyo Murillo (Colombia)
- 1995 Shigekazu Nagata (Japan), Peter H. Krammer (Germany)
- 1996 Fritz Melchers (Switzerland), Klaus Rajewsky (Germany)
- 1997 Philippe Sansonetti (France)
- 1998 Yuan Chang (USA), Patrick S. Moore (USA)
- 1999 Ralph M. Steinman (USA)
- 2000 Stanley Falkow (USA)
- 2001 Axel Ullrich (Germany)
- 2002 Rudolf Jaenisch (USA)
- 2003 Adriano Aguzzi (Switzerland)
- 2004 Shizuo Akira (Japan), Bruce A. Beutler (USA), Jules A. Hoffmann (France)
- 2005 Brian J. Druker (USA)
- 2006 Peter Palese (USA), Yoshihiro Kawaoka (Japan)
- 2007 Pascale Cossart (France)
- 2008 Hans Robert Schöler (Germany), Irving Weissman (USA), Shinya Yamanaka (Japan)
- 2009 Carl F. Nathan (USA)
- 2010 Max Dale Cooper (USA)
- 2011 Jorge E. Galán (Argentina)
- 2012 Tasuku Honjo (Japan)
- 2013 Jeffrey I. Gordon (USA)
- 2014 Jean-Laurent Casanova (France), Alain Fischer (France)
- 2015 Ralf Bartenschlager (Germany), Charles M. Rice (USA)
- 2016 Alberto Mantovani (Italy), Michel C. Nussenzweig (USA / Brazil)
- 2017 Rafi Ahmed (India / USA), Antonio Lanzavecchia (Italy / Switzerland)
- 2018 Jeffrey V. Ravetch (USA)
- 2019 Rino Rappuoli (Italy)
- 2020 Shimon Sakaguchi (Japan)
- 2021 Yasmine Belkaid (Algeria / USA), Andreas J. Bäumler (Germany / USA)
- 2022 Philip Felgner (USA), Drew Weissman (USA)
- 2023 Timothy A. Springer (USA), Francisco Sánchez Madrid (Spain)
- 2024 Lalita Ramakrishnan (USA / UK)
- 2025 Rotem Sorek (Israel / Germany)
- 2026 Andrew G. Myers (USA)

== Robert Koch Gold Medal winners since 1974 ==
- 1974 Paul Kallós (Sweden)
- 1977 Pierre Grabar (France)
- 1978 Theodor von Brand (Germany), Saul Krugman (USA)
- 1979 Sir Christopher Andrewes (United Kingdom)
- 1980 Emmy Klieneberger-Nobel (United Kingdom)
- 1981 Maclyn McCarty (USA)
- 1982 Edgar Lederer (France), Walter Pagel (United Kingdom), Karel Styblo (Netherlands)
- 1985 Richard M. Krause (USA)
- 1986 Ernst Ruska (Germany)
- 1987 Hans J. Müller-Eberhard (USA)
- 1988 Willy Burgdorfer (USA)
- 1989 Maurice Hilleman (USA)
- 1990 Ernst L. Wynder (USA)
- 1991 Werner Schäfer (Germany)
- 1992 Piet Borst (Netherlands), Howard C. Goodmann (USA)
- 1993 Karl Lennert (Germany), Otto Westphal (Switzerland)
- 1994 Paul Klein (Germany)
- 1995 Charles Weissmann (Switzerland)
- 1996 Sir Gustav Nossal (Australia)
- 1997 Satoshi Ōmura (Japan)
- 1998 George Klein (Sweden)
- 1999 Barry Bloom (USA)
- 2000 Marco Baggiolini (Switzerland)
- 2001 Avrion Mitchison (United Kingdom)
- 2002 Agnes Ullmann (France)
- 2003 Tadamitsu Kishimoto (Japan)
- 2004 Heinz Schaller (Germany)
- 2005 Emil R. Unanue (USA)
- 2006 Hans-Dieter Klenk (Germany)
- 2007 Brigitte A. Askonas (United Kingdom)
- 2008 Philip Leder (USA)
- 2009 Volker ter Meulen (Germany, Würzburg)
- 2010 Fotis C. Kafatos (Greece)
- 2011 Ernst-Ludwig Winnacker (Germany)
- 2012 Eckard Wimmer (Germany/USA)
- 2013 Anthony Fauci (USA)
- 2014 Hermann Bujard (Germany)
- 2015 Peter Piot (Belgium)
- 2016 Kai Simons (Germany)
- 2017 Christopher T. Walsh (USA)
- 2018 Staffan Normark (Sweden)
- 2019 Martin J. Blaser (USA)
- 2020 Thomas F. Meyer (Germany, Berlin)
- 2021 Kyriacos Costa Nicolaou (USA)
- 2022 Jörg Hacker (Germany)
- 2023 Patrice Courvalin (France)
- 2024 Stuart Schreiber (USA)
- 2025 Otto Haller (Germany)
- 2026 Marc Feldmann (United Kingdom)

== See also ==
- List of medicine awards
