= Craig E. Cameron =

American microbiologist

- Education: Howard University (BS); Case Western Reserve University (PhD)
- Scientific career
- Workplaces: University of North Carolina at Chapel Hill; Pennsylvania State University
- Website: Cameron Lab

Craig E. Cameron is the chair of the department of microbiology and immunology at the University of North Carolina at Chapel Hill. He is a Fellow of the American Association for the Advancement of Science and American Society for Microbiology.

== Early life and education ==
Cameron had planned to study medicine at university, but after volunteering in hospitals he realised that he did not want to become a medical doctor. He studied chemistry at Howard University and graduated in 1987. During his undergraduate research he noticed that physicians were not ready to deal with viruses. The viruses that Cameron studied included the rhinovirus, the common cold and coxsackievirus. Cameron moved to Case Western Reserve University for his doctoral studies, which he completed in 1993. He remained at Case Western as a postdoctoral researcher, before being appointed a National Institutes of Health fellow at Pennsylvania State University (Penn State).

== Research and career ==
In 1997 Cameron joined the faculty at Penn State. He was awarded a Howard Temin Award and set up a research group working on poliovirus polymerase. He was made the Louis Martarno Associate Professor in 2002. In 2006 Cameron was promoted to the Paul Berg Chair in Biochemistry. Cameron was appointed the Eberly Chair in Biochemistry and Molecular Biology at Penn State in 2013.

His research considers RNA virus infections. Cameron developed lethal mutagenesis; an alternative mechanism of action of ribavirin that renders genes unable to function. He has pioneered the use of lethal mutagenesis in novel antiviral drugs. To study the mechanism of action of ribavirin-based antivirals, Cameron developed an analytical assay that could monitor whether ribavirin could incorporate into viral RNA. These experiments revealed that ribavirin-TP, which is made of similar building blocks to RNA, is incorporated into the viral RNA. He went on to demonstrate that ribavirin works by creating extreme mutation within viruses that forces them into genetic melt down. Working with Raul Andino and Shane Crotty, Cameron demonstrated that lethal mutagenesis could be used for safe poliovirus vaccine. He has also investigated the antiviral properties of viperin, a naturally occurring enzyme that is produced in humans and mammals.

Cameron developed a microfluidic device that allowed him to simultaneously monitor thousands of cells infected with viruses. His research group infected cells in the device with a modified form of the poliovirus that produced a green fluorescent protein. The modified virus fluoresces when it is replicating, allowing researchers to monitor the replication of viruses in thousands of cells at a time. By applying potential antiviral compounds to the poliovirus infected cells, Cameron could screen for drug candidates. One of the antiviral drugs investigated by Cameron (T-1106) causes virus replication to pause and reverse, preventing efficient replication.

In 2010 Cameron was part of a team at Penn State who were awarded a $2.85 million National Science Foundation grant for K–12 students. The project, Carbon Educators and Researchers Together for Humanity (CarbonEARTH), was led by Renee Diehl and looked to partner Penn State researchers with elementary and middle school children.

Cameron joined the University of North Carolina at Chapel Hill as chair of the department of microbiology and immunology in 2019. In 2021, Cameron received a grant from the National Institutes of Health to study Coronavirus genome replication.

== Awards and honours ==
- 2014 Elected a Fellow of the American Association for the Advancement of Science
- 2016 Elected a Fellow of the American Society for Microbiology

== Selected publications ==
- Cameron, Craig E. (2000). "The broad-spectrum antiviral ribonucleoside ribavirin is an RNA virus mutagen". Nature Medicine. 6 (12): 1375–1379. doi:10.1038/82191. PMID 11100123. S2CID 52870674.
- Cameron, Craig E. (2006). "Quasispecies diversity determines pathogenesis through cooperative interactions in a viral population". Nature. 439 (7074): 344–348. Bibcode:2006Natur.439..344V. doi:10.1038/nature04388. PMC 1569948. PMID 16327776.
- Cameron, Craig E.; Andino, Raul; Crotty, Shane (2001). "RNA virus error catastrophe: Direct molecular test by using ribavirin". PNAS. 98 (12): 6895–6900. Bibcode:2001PNAS...98.6895C. doi:10.1073/pnas.111085598. PMC 34449. PMID 11371613. S2CID 8030971.

Cameron is on the editorial board of the Journal of Biological Chemistry and Journal of Virology.
