= Alessandro Sette =

Italian immunologist (born 1960)

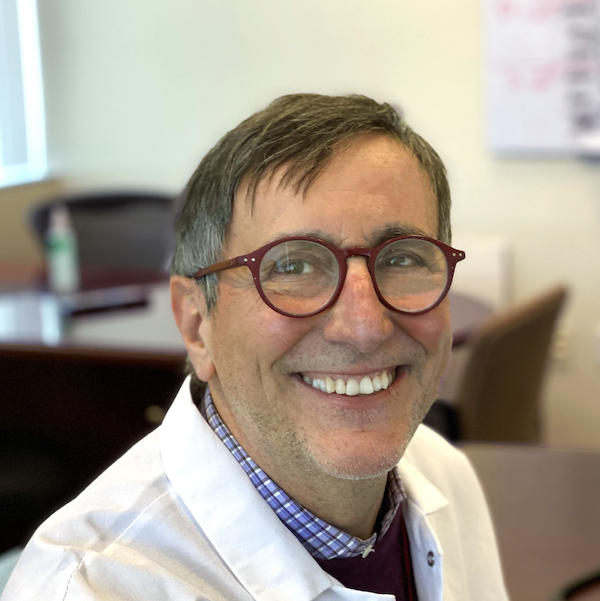
- Born: August 11, 1960 (age 66); Rome, Italy
- Education: University of Rome
- Known for: Defining how T cells see antigens

Alessandro Sette is an Italian immunologist. He was born on August 11, 1960, in Rome, Italy, to Pietro Sette, a prominent Italian businessman and politician, and Renata Sette. Sette is a professor at the La Jolla Institute for Immunology (LJI). He is an adjunct professor at the University of California, San Diego. Sette studies the specific epitopes that the immune system recognizes in cancer, autoimmunity, allergy, and infectious diseases.

In 1988, Sette moved to San Diego to conduct research at San Diego biotech Cytel. He then co-founded Epimmune. In 2003, Sette joined the faculty of the La Jolla Institute for Immunology.

In 2003, Sette founded and currently co-leads the Immune Epitope Database (IEDB), an NIAID-funded online database that catalogues epitopes involved in immune system recognition of allergens, infectious diseases, autoantigens, and transplanted tissue in humans and various species.

In 2020, Sette published the first study of SARS-CoV-2 epitopes targeted by the human immune system. He has co-led research into CD8+ and CD4+ T cell responses in COVID-19 patients and studied CD8+ T cell cross-reactivity to SARS-CoV-2 epitopes and other coronaviruses.

In 2025, Sette and colleagues published findings indicating that patients with amyotrophic lateral sclerosis (ALS) exhibit adaptive immune responses targeting the C9orf72 protein, a common genetic contributor to the disease. The study reported enhanced CD4⁺ T-cell activity and cytokine production in ALS patients compared to controls, suggesting that autoimmune mechanisms may contribute to ALS disease pathology and progression.

Throughout his career, Sette has maintained strong scientific ties with Italy and currently is a Member of the Scientific Council of ISSNAF, a not-for-profit organization whose mission is to connect, empower and celebrate the Italian Intellectual Diaspora in North America. He was recently named as a Member of ISNAFF's Board of Directors. In 2025, Sette was awarded the title of "Cavaliere dell'Ordine al Merito della Repubblica Italiana" in recognition of his contributions to biomedical science and global health.

== Education ==
Sette received his Laurea in Biological Sciences from the University of Rome, Italy, followed by postdoctoral fellowships in Immunology with Luciano Adorini at the C.R.E. Casaccia in Rome, Italy, and Howard Grey at the National Jewish Center for Immunology and Respiratory Medicine in Denver, Colorado.

== Publications/patents ==
Sette is a coauthor of over 1000 peer-reviewed publications, and is an inventor on 47 US issued patents. He has an H-factor of 201, and is identified by Clarivate as a highly cited researcher.

== Awards and honors ==
1. The Scripps Research Institute Adjunct Faculty
2. American Association of Immunologists Investigator Award (1995)
3. International Immunomics and Immmunogenics Society Award (2006)
4. Named as one of the top 400 influential researchers in the last 15 years (2013)
5. 10th Annual ViE Vaccine Industry Excellence Award (2017)
6. Fellow, American Association for the Advancement of Science (2020)
7. Ranked 4th amongst Italian Scientists in Biomedical Sciences (2021)
8. Honorary Member, Accademia Medica di Roma (2021)
9. Gold Medal, Italian Society of Internal Medicine (2021)
10. Fellow, Sigma Xi The Scientific Research Honor Society (2021)
11. Boulle-SEI International Award (Alicante, Spain 2021)
12. Fellow, American Academy of Microbiology (2023)
13. Member, Scientific Council of Italian Scientists & Scholars in North America Foundation, ISSNAF (2023)
14. Ranked 3rd amongst Italian Scientists in Biomedical Sciences (2023)
15. Cavaliere dell'Ordine al Merito della Repubblica Italiana (2025)
16. William Procter Prize for Scientific Achievement (2025)
17. Francesco Netti Prize (2025)
18. AAI-Steinman Award for Human Immunology (2026)

== Research ==
In the mid-80s, at the same time as Paul Allen in Emil Unanue's lab, Sette together with Soren Buus in Howard Grey's lab reported the first direct evidence that MHC molecules' function is to bind antigenic peptides and present them to the T cell receptor, which triggers a T cell response. Follow-up work explained MHC restriction. In 1989, utilizing an Apple IIe, Sette wrote the first algorithm to predict peptide binding to two murine MHC alleles and over the course of the next 25 years, he defined motifs associated with over one hundred different class I and class II MHC variants expressed in humans, chimps, macaques, gorilla, horse, and mice. He discovered and characterized how MHC variants can be grouped according to broad common functional specificities (MHC supertypes), greatly facilitating epitope classification, characterization and understanding the basic rules of epitope-MHC interactions.

Contrary to the then wide-held assumption that T cell receptors (TCR) solely function as on/off switches, Sette showed that depending on the affinity of the interaction, TCR engagement could result in inhibition of T cell activation, normal activation, or heteroclitic stimulation and differential signaling, in a mechanism that is known as TCR antagonism. This discovery had a profound influence on the understanding of the impact of epitope analogs on antigen recognition, development of more potent cancer antigens, and basic studies on positive and negative selection. Sette is using epitopes as specific probes to define the understanding of immune responses to many different targets, from infectious diseases such as COVID-19, tuberculosis, whooping cough, dengue or Zika, to allergies and asthma caused by pollens, cockroaches and dust mites, to vaccines, autoimmunity and neurodegenerative diseases and cancer.

Sette's group was first to define successful adaptive response to SARS-CoV-2, by studying mild convalescent samples, and defined durability of immune memory in natural infection and vaccination. They reported the phenomenon of SARS-CoV-2 preexisting immune memory in unexposed donors, and demonstrated its influence on vaccination outcomes. Sette's group also demonstrated that T cell responses are largely preserved in terms of recognition of SARS-CoV-2 variants, including Omicron and Delta.

Studying the potential role of adaptive responses in neurodegenerative disease, Sette provided the first direct evidence that autoimmunity could play a role in Parkinson’s disease. Subsequently, he developed a series of approaches to epitope identification, mRNA sequencing, and TCR profiling that have been used to characterize responses to autoantigens, and control antigens as a function of biological variables and disease progression.
