= Gwendalyn J. Randolph =

American immunologist

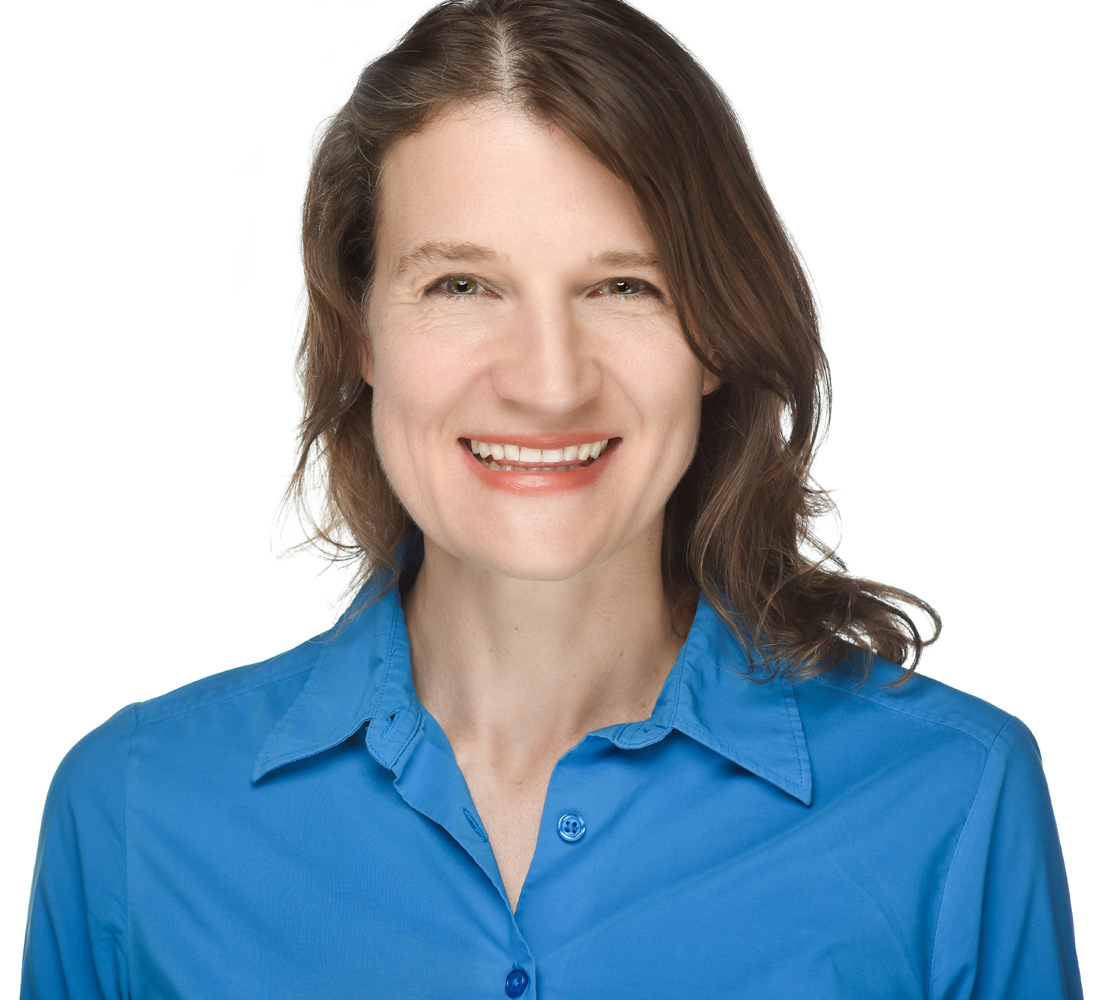
- Born: Hart, Texas, U.S.
- Education: Temple University; Stony Brook University
- Known for: Dendritic cell differentiation and trafficking, immune cell and lipoprotein trafficking in inflammatory bowel disease and atherosclerosis
- Awards: American Heart Association Established Investigator Award, Pioneer Award for High Risk High Reward Initiative Programs NIH Director's Office, NIH MERIT Award, Special Recognition Award in Atherosclerosis American Heart Association
- Scientific career
- Fields: Immunology, vascular biology
- Workplaces: Washington University in St. Louis, Icahn School of Medicine at Mount Sinai

Gwendalyn J. Randolph is an American immunologist, the Emil R. Unanue Distinguished Professor in the Department of Immunology and Pathology at Washington University School of Medicine. During her postdoctoral work, Randolph characterized monocyte differentiation to dendritic cells and macrophages and made advances in our understanding of dendritic cell trafficking and the fate of monocytes recruited to sites of inflammation. Her lab has contributed to the Immunological Genome Project by characterizing macrophage gene expression and her laboratory has particularly contributed to our understanding of macrophages in the peritoneal cavity of mice and humans. Her work has also focused on the immunological mechanisms driving atherosclerosis and inflammatory bowel disease (IBD) by exploring lymphatic function and lipoprotein trafficking.

== Early life and education ==
Randolph, born Gwendalyn Wilson, was born in the small farming town of Hart, Texas. She grew up helping her parents on their maize and cotton farm by tending to weeds and helping with harvests. At school at Hart High School, she showed an early passion for design and textiles, winning awards and funding to travel to New York and Los Angeles for her sewing achievements. She accepted a sports scholarship to play basketball at Wayland Baptist University in 1987, and majored in biology.

In 1989, she married Keith Randolph; they moved to the east coast where she continued her studies at Temple University. She graduated with a Bachelors of Science in biological sciences in 1991. She received her PhD in Immunology and Pathology in 1995 from Stony Brook University. working under the mentorship of Martha B. Furie studying themoocyte migration.

Randolph stayed in New York for postdoctoral training at The Rockefeller University and Weill Cornell Medicine in the departments of Cellular Immunology and Pathology. She worked under the mentorship of Bill Muller, vascular biologist, and Ralph Steinman studying dendritic cell maturation and migration.

=== Dendritic cell maturation and migration ===
Randolph's postdoctoral work, in collaboration with Steinman and Muller, investigated the differentiation of dendritic cells and their migration to lymph nodes from the periphery. She developed an in vitro model to assess monocyte differentiation into dendritic cells (DCs) or macrophages. They found that exposure of monocytes to endothelial cells was critical to DC differentiation and that exposure to phagocytic particles caused cells that had previously reverse-transmigrated to fully displayed a DC-like phenotype in terms of intracellular and extracellular markers as well as a highly ramified phenotype. Randolph also showed that monocytes could also differentiate into macrophages if they remained in the sub-endothelial matrix. This work was followed with a validation of these findings in vivo, published one year later in Immunity.

== Career and research ==
In 1998, Randolph became an instructor in the Department of Pathology at Weill Cornell as well as an Adjunct Faculty at The Rockefeller University's Department of Cellular Physiology and Immunology. In 2000, she joined Icahn School of Medicine at Mount Sinai where she spent 11 years on the faculty in the Department of Gene and Cell Medicine. At Mt. Sinai, her lab explored monocyte fate and differentiation, and their trafficking out of inflamed tissues through lymphatic vessels. One objective was to determine if macrophages could migrate out of organs, via lymphatics or blood, in healthy or diseased states; the laboratory concluded that they do not. Her lab was among the early labs to identify blood monocytes in mice developing a universal method for doing so using expression of CD115, supplanting the far less selective CD11b used to identify myeloid cells more generally. Her lab conducted comparisons of mouse and human monocyte subsets, and created a universal classification nomenclature of myeloid cells.

Randolph moved her lab to Washington University in St. Louis in 2011, studying the role of cholesterol trafficking in diseases such as atherosclerosis and more recently, Crohn's Disease. From 2015 to 2017, she was the Chief of the Division of Immunobiology at Washington University. She is currently the Emil R. Unanue Distinguished Professor in the Department of Pathology and Immunology at Washington University. In 2017, she became the Immunology Graduate Program Director at the School of Medicine, stepping down in 2023.

=== Immunological Genome Project and macrophage diversity ===
Randolph's lab has contributed to the Immunological Genome Project, a project whose goal is to explore how gene expression relates to immune system function in mice. She spearheaded early work on mouse macrophage gene expression, and her paper published as a part of the Immgen Project is the most highly cited paper of the project.

=== Lymphatic vasculature and cholesterol trafficking ===
Randolph's focus changed towards the implications of immune trafficking and lymphatic vasculature in disease processes after moving to Washington University. They showed that lymphatic vessels are critical to the mobilization of cholesterol for excretion and that enhancing lymphatic function might be therapeutic in atherosclerosis. Her lab then showed that collecting lymphatic vessels (CLVs) are involved in the immune response by acting as a site for macrophages and dendritic cells to uptake antigens. The results emphasized that CLVs are important in the coordination of immune responses surrounding adipose depots. In 2018, her team found that skin-driven immune responses can cause systemic changes that affect the ability of cholesterol to be taken in by tissues thus promoting plaque build-up in arteries around the heart.

In 2015, Randolph was awarded the National Institutes of Health Director's 2015 Pioneer Award to pursue high risk-high reward research to study the role of lymphatics and cellular transport in inflammatory bowel disease in collaboration with gastroenterologist, Jean-Frederic Colombel, . In order to understand if damage to lymphatic collecting vessels might contribute to human disease, as it has been shown to do in mice, Randolph's lab developed a three-dimensional imaging approach to explore lymphatic vasculature abnormalities in human mesenteric tissue. This novel approach has allowed them to identify novel tertiary lymphoid organs along the collecting lymphatic vessels that are likely involved in aberrant delivery of lymph to lymph nodes.

== Personal life ==
Randolph is married to Hermann Kyrychenko and has two children.

== Select publications ==
- L Huang, BH Zinselmeyer, CH Chang, BT Saunders, AF Elvington, O Baba, TJ Broekelmann, L Qi, JS Rueve, MA Swartz, BS Kim, RP Mecham, H Wiig, MJ Thomas, MG Sorci-Thomas, GJ Randolph. 2019. Interleukin 17 drives interstitial entrapment of tissue lipoproteins in experimental psoriasis. Cell Metabolism, 29:475-487. PMC 6365189
- Zhang, N; Czepielewski, RS; Jarjour, NN; Erlich, EC; Esaulova, E; Saunders, BT; Grover, SP; Cleuren, AC; Broze, GJ; Edelson, BT; Mackman, N; Zinselmeyer, BH; Randolph, GJ (2019). "Expression of factor V by resident peritoneal macrophages boosts host defense in the peritoneal cavity". J. Exp. Med. 216 (6): 1291–6. doi:10.1084/jem.20182024. PMC 6547866. PMID 31048328.
- Kuan EL, Ivanov S, Bridenbaugh EA, Victora G, Wang W, Childs EW, Platt AM, Jakubzick CV, Mason RJ, Gashev AA, Nussenzweig M, Swartz MA, Dustin ML, Zaweija DC, Randolph GJ. 2015. Collecting lymphatic vessel permeability facilitates adipose tissue inflammation and distribution of antigen to lymph node-homing adipose tissue dendritic cells. J. Immunol., Jun 1;194(11):5200-10. PMCID: PMC4433841
- Gautier, E.L., Shay, T., Miller, J., Greter, M., Jakubzick, C., Ivanov, S., Helft, J., Chow, A., Elpek, K.G., Gordonov, S., Mazloom, A.R., Ma’ayan, A., Chua, W.J., Hansen, T.H., Turley, S.J., Merad, M., and Randolph, G.J. (2012). Gene expression profiles and transcriptional regulatory pathways underlying murine tissue macrophage identity and diversity. Nature Immunology, 13(11):1118-1128. PMCID: PMC3558276
- Jakubzick, C., Gautier, E.L., Gibbings, S.L., Sojka, D.K., Schlitzer, A., Johnson, T.E., Ivanov, S., Duan, Q., Bala, S., Condon, T., van Rooijen, N., Grainger, J.R., Belkaid, Y., Ma’ayan, A., Riches, D.W., Yokoyama, W.M., Ginhoux, F., Henson, P.M., and Randolph, G.J. (2013). Minimal differentiation of classical monocytes as they survey steady-state tissues and transport antigen to lymph nodes. Immunity, 39(3):599-610. PMCID: PMC3820017
- Ingersoll, M.A.; Spanbroek, R.; Lottaz, C.; Gautier, E.L.; Frankenberger, M.; Hoffmann, R.; Lang, R.; Haniffa, M.; Collin, M.; Tacke, F.; Habenicht, A.J.; Ziegler-Heitbrock, L.; Randolph, G.J. (2010). "Comparison of gene expression profiles between human and mouse monocyte subsets". Blood. 115 (3): e10–19. doi:10.1182/blood-2009-07-235028. PMC 2810986. PMID 19965649.
- Tacke, F; Alvarez, D; Kaplan, TJ; Jakubzick, C; Spanbroek, R; Llodrá, J; Garin, A; Liu, J; Mack, M; van Rooijen, N; Lira, SA; Habenicht, AJ; Randolph, GJ (2007). "Monocyte subsets differentially employ CCR2, CCR5, and CX_{3}CR1 to accumulate within atherosclerotic plaques". J. Clin. Invest. 117 (1): 185–194. doi:10.1172/JCI28549. PMC 1716202. PMID 17200718. [with commentary].
- Angeli, V; Ginhoux, F; Llodrà, J; Quemeneur, L; Frenette, PS; Skobe, M; Jessberger, R; Merad, M; Randolph, GJ (2006). "B cell-driven lymphangiogenesis in inflamed lymph nodes enhances dendritic cell mobilization". Immunity. 24 (2): 203–15. doi:10.1016/j.immuni.2006.01.003. PMID 16473832.
- Randolph, G.J., Sanchez-Schmitz, G., Liebman, R.M., and Schäkel, K. (2002). The CD16+ (FcgRIII+) subset of human monocytes preferentially becomes migratory dendritic cells in a model tissue setting. Journal of Experimental Medicine, 196(4):517-527. PMCID: PMC2196052
- Randolph, G.J. and Furie, M.B. (1996). Mononuclear phagocytes egress from an in vitro model of the vascular wall by migrating across endothelium in the basal to apical direction: role of intercellular adhesion molecule 1 and the CD11/CD18 integrins. Journal of Experimental Medicine, 183(2):451-462. PMCID: PMC2192453
