= Craig Cameron =

Craig Cameron may refer to:

- Craig Cameron (ice hockey) (1945–2012), National Hockey League player
- Craig Cameron (horse trainer) (born 1949), American Natural Horsemanship practitioner
- Craig E. Cameron, American microbiologist and biochemist
