= Volkmar Braun =

German biochemist and microbiologist

- Born: July 18, 1938 (age 88); Ravensburg, Germany
- Education: University of Freiburg; LMU Munich
- Known for: Braun's lipoprotein TonB-dependent transport Surface signaling
- Awards: Robert Koch Prize (1994); Honorary doctorate, University of Würzburg (2005); Member, German National Academy of Sciences Leopoldina (2008)
- Scientific career
- Fields: Microbiology; Biochemistry
- Workplaces: Max Planck Institute for Biology, Tübingen
- Doctoral advisor: Gerhard Braunitzer

Volkmar Braun (born 18 July 1938) is a German biochemist and microbiologist. He held a chair of microbiology at the University of Tübingen from 1974 to 2007, and was afterwards a Max Planck Fellow at the Max Planck Institute for Developmental Biology in Tübingen.

Braun's research mainly concerned the outer membrane of Escherichia coli. In 1969 he discovered a lipoprotein covalently bound to the peptidoglycan layer of the cell envelope, now known as Braun's lipoprotein. He later studied how iron compounds and protein toxins are carried across the outer membrane, which has no energy source of its own. With Robert E. W. Hancock he showed that the proton motive force of the inner membrane provides the energy for transport across the outer membrane. He described surface signaling, a form of gene regulation in which a signal received at the cell surface is transmitted to the cytoplasm, where a sigma factor is activated. He also studied the structure, mode of action and uptake of bacterial protein toxins: colicins, pesticin, and the hemolysin of Serratia marcescens.

== Early life and education ==
Braun was born on 18 July 1938 in Ravensburg, Germany. He studied chemistry at the University of Freiburg and LMU Munich and carried out his diploma and doctoral research at the Max Planck Institute of Biochemistry in Munich under Gerhard Braunitzer and Adolf Butenandt. He received his doctorate from LMU Munich in 1965.

== Career ==
By January 1966 Braun was a research fellow in the biochemistry department of the California Institute of Technology in Pasadena. From 1966 to 1971 he was a scientific assistant at the Max Planck Institute of Biochemistry in Munich and at the Max Planck Institute of Biology in Tübingen, before moving to the Max Planck Institute of Molecular Genetics in Berlin. He was at the Berlin institute from 1971 to 1974. In 1974 he was appointed to a chair of microbiology at the University of Tübingen, named Microbiology/Membrane Physiology, which he held until his retirement in 2007. He then held a six-year appointment as a Max Planck Fellow at the Max Planck Institute for Developmental Biology in Tübingen, where he worked in the protein department headed by Andrei Lupas.

== Research ==
Braun discovered a lipoprotein covalently bound to the murein (peptidoglycan) layer of the E. coli cell envelope. He reported it in 1969. The protein is attached to the peptidoglycan by a lysine residue and can be released by trypsin, which hydrolyses that bond. It was sequenced by him and Valerie Bosch in 1972 and they found it very repetitive. Shortly afterwards Klaus Hantke determined the lipid structure, an S-glyceryl-cysteine residue carrying three fatty acids attached to the N-terminal cysteine. It became known as Braun's lipoprotein. The repetitive sequence he reported in 1972 was later shown to form an α-helical coiled coil, which was not recognised at the time.

Braun and colleagues isolated the outer membrane protein then known as TonA, now FhuA, which is involved in ferrichrome-dependent iron uptake and also serves as the receptor for phages T1, T5 and φ80 and for colicin M. They showed that FhuA functions as a gated channel requiring energy for phage entry. Although the outer membrane contains no energy source of its own, the irreversible adsorption of phages T1 and φ80 to E. coli requires energy, and in 1976 Braun and Robert E. W. Hancock showed that it comes from the proton motive force of the cytoplasmic membrane. He proposed that the tonB product couples metabolic energy to the outer membrane receptor proteins, and he and his colleagues named the "TonB box", the conserved pentapeptide at the N terminus of TonB-dependent transporters, which is also present in the TonB-dependent colicins. They further showed that the TolR and TolQ proteins can substitute in vivo, to some extent, for ExbD and ExbB.

Braun conducted a genetic analysis of the fec region, which encodes a ferric dicitrate transport system of E. coli. From this work, he described surface signaling, a form of transcriptional regulation that begins at the cell surface. It involves the transfer of a signal across the outer membrane, the periplasm and the cytoplasmic membrane into the cytoplasm without the ferric dicitrate itself getting inside the cell. His laboratory found that cells expressing truncated FecR derivatives no longer responded to ferric dicitrate and expressed the fec transport genes constitutively. In the model developed on the basis of this study, ferric citrate binds the outer membrane receptor FecA, whose periplasmic N-terminal portion interacts with FecR at the cytoplasmic membrane, and FecR in turn activates the cytoplasmic sigma factor FecI by increasing its affinity for RNA polymerase. In later work, Braun proposed that the signal crosses the inner membrane through proteolysis of FecR by RseP, which is an enzyme of the sigma E activation pathway.

Braun and colleagues described colicin M, a 28 kDa TonB-dependent colicin, in the 1970s, and used competition experiments with FhuA-dependent phages to show that it requires energy to cross the outer membrane, as do colicins B and Ib, while the Tol-dependent colicin E1 does not. With Holger Pilsl he compared the closely related colicins E1 and 10 to establish where the specificity for Tol-dependent or TonB-dependent uptake resides, and concluded that the TolC binding region must lie downstream of the TolA binding sequences. His laboratory also showed that the hemolysin ShlA of Serratia marcescens is modified as it is secreted through the outer membrane protein ShlB, which activates it through a conformational change, and that cells grown at 37 °C lysed erythrocytes approximately ten times less than cells grown at 30 °C, the result of which can be attributed to lipopolysaccharide structure and decreased levels of ShlB.

== Awards and honours ==
- 1982 – Main Prize (Hauptpreis), German Society for Hygiene and Microbiology
- 1994 – Robert Koch Prize, Robert Koch Foundation
- 1998 – Ordinary member, Heidelberg Academy of Sciences and Humanities
- 2005 – Honorary doctorate (Dr. med. honoris causa), Faculty of Medicine, University of Würzburg
- 2008 – Member, German National Academy of Sciences Leopoldina

== Selected publications ==
- Braun, V; Rehn, K (1969). "Chemical characterization, spatial distribution and function of a lipoprotein (murein-lipoprotein) of the E. coli cell wall. The specific effect of trypsin on the membrane structure". European Journal of Biochemistry. 10 (3): 426–438. doi:10.1111/j.1432-1033.1969.tb00707.x. PMID 4899922.
- Braun, V; Bosch, V (1972). "Sequence of the murein-lipoprotein and the attachment site of the lipid". European Journal of Biochemistry. 28 (1): 51–69. doi:10.1111/j.1432-1033.1972.tb01883.x.
- Braun, V (1995). "Energy-coupled transport and signal transduction through the Gram-negative outer membrane via TonB-ExbB-ExbD-dependent receptor proteins". FEMS Microbiology Reviews. 16 (4): 295–307. doi:10.1111/j.1574-6976.1995.tb00177.x.
- Braun, V; Hartmann, MD; Hantke, K (2022). "Transcription regulation of iron carrier transport genes by ECF sigma factors through signaling from the cell surface into the cytoplasm". FEMS Microbiology Reviews. 46 (4): fuac010. doi:10.1093/femsre/fuac010. PMC 9249621.
- Braun, V; Ratliff, AC; Celia, H; Buchanan, SK (2023). "Energization of outer membrane transport by the ExbB ExbD molecular motor". Journal of Bacteriology. 205 (6): e0003523. doi:10.1128/jb.00035-23.
- Braun, V (2024). "Substrate uptake by TonB-dependent outer membrane transporters". Molecular Microbiology. 122 (6): 929–947. doi:10.1111/mmi.15332. PMC 11658791.
