= Gertrud Meissner =

German physician

- Gertrud Meißner
- Born: 16 April 1895; Wollin, Pomerania
- Died: 20 November 1985 (aged 90); Borstel, Holstein
- Citizenship: German, West German
- Education: Greifswald University, Wrocław University
- Awards: Robert Koch Prize (1965)
- Scientific career
- Fields: bacteriology
- Institutions: Greifswald University; Research Center Borstel, Hamburg; University of Hamburg

Gertrud Meissner (born 16 April 1895 in Wollin, Pomerania; died 20 November 1985 in Borstel, Holstein) was a German medical doctor.

== Biography ==
Gertrud Meissner studied medicine in Berlin, Jena and Greifswald (1915-1922), qualifying from Greifswald University. She remained at Greifswald until 1927 conducting scientific research at the Institute of Hygiene. In 1928 she received her Ph.D. in bacteriology and hygiene from the University of Breslau (now the University of Wrocław) where she lectured at the Institute of Bacteriological Hygiene. 1935 to 1945 Meissner was head of a medical-diagnostic institute and active at the institute for medical-technical assistants.

Meissner fled post-war Wrocław for Schleswig-Holstein. From 1948 she was head of the Microbiological Laboratory of Tuberculosis - Research Center Borstel at Hamburg. After 1961 she taught at the Medical Faculty of University of Hamburg as an honorary professor.

She wrote about 200 scientific papers on various problems of medical bacteriology and serology as well as on the chemotherapy of tuberculosis and in 1960 was awarded the Cross of Merit 1st Class of Order of Merit of the Federal Republic of Germany. In 1966 she became an honorary doctor of Kiel University.

In 1965 she received the Robert Koch Medal and Award.

== Literature ==
- Hans Reddemann: Famous and remarkable physicians from and in Pomerania. Thomas Helms Verlag Schwerin 2003. ISBN 978-3-935749-24-4, p. 114
