= Infection and Immunity =

- Discipline: Infectious disease
- Language: English
- Edited by: Andreas J. Bäumler

Publication details
- History: 1967–present
- Publisher: American Society for Microbiology (United States)
- Frequency: Monthly
- Open access: Delayed
- Impact factor: 3.4 (2025)

Standard abbreviations
- ISO 4: Infect. Immun.

Indexing
- CODEN: INFIBR
- ISSN: 0019-9567 (print); 1098-5522 (web)
- LCCN: 70234261
- OCLC no.: 01753126

Links
- Journal homepage; Online access; Online archive

Infection and Immunity is a peer-reviewed medical journal published by the American Society for Microbiology. It focuses on interactions between bacterial, fungal, or parasitic pathogens and their hosts. Areas covered include molecular pathogenesis, cellular microbiology, bacterial infection, host responses and inflammation, fungal and parasitic infections, microbial immunity and vaccines, and molecular genomics. The journal publishes primary research articles, editorials, commentaries, minireviews, and a spotlight report highlighting articles of particular interest selected by the editors. Articles are freely accessible after 6 months (delayed open access). Through its "Global Outreach Program," free online access is available to qualified microbiologists in eligible developing countries.

== History ==
The journal was established in 1970. Prior to that time, original research articles covering topics in infection and immunity were published in a section of the Journal of Bacteriology. As the size of this section grew, the need for a separate journal publishing peer-reviewed research in this area became apparent. The first editor-in-chief was Erwin Neter (SUNY Buffalo).

=== Editors-in-chief ===
The following persons have been editor-in-chief of Infection and Immunity:

- 1970-1979: Erwin Neter
- 1980-1989: Joseph W. Shands, Jr.
- 1990-1999: Vincent A. Fischetti
- 2000-2007: Alison D. O'Brien
- 2007–2017: Ferric C. Fang
- 2017–present: Andreas J. Bäumler

== Abstracting and indexing ==
The journal is abstracted and indexed in:

- AGRICOLA
- BIOSIS Previews
- CAB Abstracts
- Cambridge Scientific Abstracts
- Chemical Abstracts Service
- Current Contents/Life Sciences
- EMBASE
- Food Science and Technology Abstracts
- Illustrata
- Index Medicus
- MEDLINE
- Science Citation Index

According to the Journal Citation Reports, the journal has a 2025 impact factor of 3.4.
