= Steffen Mueller =

Steffen Mueller is a virologist and was assistant professor at Stony Brook University in New York.

Mueller received his Ph.D. in molecular microbiology from Stony Brook University in 2002 in the laboratory of Eckard Wimmer.

Mueller is a co-developer of the platform technology dubbed SAVE (Synthetic Attenuated Virus Engineering), a method to produce weakened synthetic viruses that are permanently prevented from regaining virulence. The method may hold the key to a new class of antiviral, so-called live, or attenuated vaccines.

Mueller is co-founder and Chief Scientific Officer of Codagenix Inc., a New York-based biotechnology company engaged in the development of vaccines.
