= Carl F. Nathan =

American microbiologist and immunologist

- Education: Harvard Medical School
- Spouse: Amy Singewald Nathan
- Awards: Robert Koch Prize
- Scientific career
- Workplaces: Weill Cornell Medicine

Carl F. Nathan is the chair of the department of microbiology and immunology at Weill Cornell Medicine and a former dean of the Weill Graduate School of Medical Sciences at Cornell University. Some of his most notable work has been in the characterization of IFNγ, TGF-β, and TNFα in immunology. The Nathan lab studies the immune response to M. tuberculosis.

== Career ==
Nathan was born to Paul and Dorothy Nathan. His brother is Andrew J. Nathan, a Columbia University political scientist, and his sister Janet Nathan. He graduated from Harvard College in 1967. His senior honors thesis, "Plague Prevention and Politics in Manchuria, 1910-1931" was published in by the East Asian Research Center, Harvard University. He graduated Harvard Medical School in 1972. After an internal medicine residency, he did a fellowship in oncology. He was a professor at the Rockefeller University from 1977 to 1986, before moving to Cornell. He served as the chair of the department of microbiology and immunology from 1998 to 2025. His lab is in the Belfer Research Building.

Nathan was involved in the discovery of the roles of IFNγ, TGF-β, and TNFα in macrophages.

Nathan was elected to the American Society for Clinical Investigation in 1983 and the National Academy of Medicine in 1998. He was elected to the National Academy of Sciences in 2011. He received the Robert Koch Prize in 2009 and the Anthony Cerami Award in Translational Medicine in 2013.

He married Amy Singewald, an educator, actress, and writer in 1967

== Publications ==
- Nathan, Carl F. Plague Prevention and Politics in Manchuria, 1910-1931. Cambridge: East Asian Research Center, Harvard University; distributed by Harvard University Press, 1967.
