= Immunome =

The immunome is the set of genes that code for proteins which constitute the immune system, excluding those that are widespread in other cell types, and not involved in the immune response itself. It is further defined as the set of peptides derived from the proteome that interact with the immune system. There are numerous ongoing efforts to characterize and sequence the immunomes of humans, mice, and elements of non-human primates. Typically, immunomes are studied using immunofluorescence microscopy to determine the presence and activity of immune-related enzymes and pathways. Practical applications for studying the immunome include vaccines, therapeutic proteins, and further treatment of other diseases. The study of the immunome falls under the field of immunomics.

== Etymology ==
The word immunome is a portmanteau of the words "immune" and "chromosome." See omics for a further discussion.

== History ==
The exact size of the human immunome has been a topic of study for decades. However, the amount of information it encodes is said to exceed the size of the human genome by several orders of magnitude due to, at least in part, somatic hypermutation and junctional diversity. Several efforts are attempting to characterize the immunomes of humans and other species.

The Human Immunome Program is a major effort, launched in 2016, as a collaborative project between The Human Vaccines Project, Vanderbilt University Medical Center, and Illumina, Inc. Its goal is to decipher the complete collection of human B and T immune cell receptors. Thousands of individuals will be studied, representing the range of age, gender, ethnicity, geographical origin, health status, and vaccination status. The results will be shared as an open-source database. The sequencing project will continue until unique sequences stop appearing within B and T cell receptors and is expected to take ten years.

The Immunological Genome Project's stated goal is to characterize the immunome of the mouse, generating "a complete microarray dissection of gene expression and its regulation in the immune system". This project is intended to function as a primary resource. The project engages more than 20 research labs, studying T cells, B cells, and dendritic cells, along with many other cell types. The project began in 2008.

Non-human primate immunomes are studied because of their genetic similarity to humans.

In 2025, the Mal-ID project first sequenced B (BCR) and T cell receptors (TCR) at scale across multiple diagnoses using three machine learning models, achieving an area under the receiver operative characteristic curve value of 0.986.

== Methods of study ==
In order to gain useful knowledge about the immunome and its characteristics, the cells and components of the immune system must be phenotyped in a quick and pragmatic manner. There are hundreds of known cell types within the immune system and the possibility of detecting and characterizing them without the use of recent advances in immunophenotyping technology was remote because large amounts of an individual's blood would have been required. This outdated method is called low-dimensional immunophenotyping. However, high-dimensional immunophenotyping is now a possibility. The types of high-dimensional immunophenotyping can be broadly grouped into two categories: the use of isotopes of lanthanide and the use of fluorophores. These advanced technologies allow for up to 100 parameters to be measured at one time.

== Applications ==
There are potentially far-reaching applications for studying the immunome. Some scientists believe that knowledge gained from the immunome could lead to the discovery of differences in the absolute number of T cell epitopes, and could reveal antigenic relationships between different but immunologically similar pathogens, potentially unlocking autoimmune disease therapies and organ transplantation.

Immunome investigation has proven useful in determining the symptoms and potential causes of pulmonary fibrosis on a molecular level.

The development of vaccines is also an application of immunome study as shown by Carlos F. Suárez and his colleagues. They were able to find components of a malaria vaccine that could be readily used in humans as a result of having characterized the cell surface receptor of an immune cell from an owl monkey. These monkeys have been shown to be highly susceptible to human malaria, so they serve as a good model for the disease. It could also be possible to develop an influenza vaccine that would provide protection from several strains of the virus.

Furthermore, analyzation of the immunomes of non-human primates and other species can reflect the evolutionary history of species as shown by David F. Plaza and his colleagues. This immunome data can also be helpful when testing antibody therapies on non-human primates to ensure they are safe for humans. This can be accomplished by being able to interpret results in the context of the slight differences in ortholog structure between the human and non-human primate immunomes.

== Databases ==
There are a number of databases corresponding to the different facets of the human immunome and the immunomes of other species.

=== Immunome Knowledge Base (IKB) ===
An effort is being made to assemble immunological information into a singular database called the Immunome Knowledge Base(IKB). The two scientists behind the effort, Csaba Ortutay & Mauno Vihinen, have integrated data from three separate databases into IKB. These three databases, Immunome, ImmTree, and ImmunomeBase, all have separate, but related information pertaining to the immunome. Immunome contains entries to official gene names according to the HUGO Gene Nomenclature Committee, alternative names, and locations of genes on the chromosomes. ImmTree contains entries related to the molecular evolution of the immune system, including orthologous genes and phylogenetic trees. Finally, ImmunomeBase is a multi-species database related to immunity. Altogether, as of 2009, IKB has entries for more than 100,000 data items, including 893 entries for genes in the immunome.

=== Immune Epitope Database (IEDB) ===
This database serves as a resource for data on antibody and T cell epitopes studied in humans, non-human primates, and other species as it relates to disease, allergies, autoimmunity, and transplantation. The database also has tools to assist in the prediction and analysis of epitopes.

=== Immunome Database for Marsupials and Monotremes (IDMM) ===
This database has data for every known marsupial and monotreme immune gene. It serves as a resource for immunologists and researchers studying the evolution of mammalian immunity.

=== Immunology Database and Analysis Portal (ImmPort) ===
A database developed for the purpose of promoting the re-use of immunological data. It is a partnership between researchers at the University of California-San Francisco, Stanford University, the University of Buffalo, the Technion - Israel Institute of Technology, and Northrop Grumman. It encompasses results from over 400 studies related to immunology.

=== Immunological Genome Project (ImmGen) ===
This database is a public resource containing the data relating to the study of the immune system of the mouse.

=== Other databases ===
- Reference Database of Immune Cells (RefDIC)
- Innate Immune Database (IIDB)
- Immunogenetic Related Information Source (IRIS)
- DC ATLAS
- Human Immunome Project
