= Beijerinck Virology Prize =

The M.W. Beijerinck Virology Prize (M.W. Beijerinck Virologie Prijs) is a prize in virology awarded every two years by the Koninklijke Nederlandse Akademie van Wetenschappen (KNAW). The prize consists of a medal and a monetary award of €35,000. KNAW's two conditions for the prize nomination are that the nominee must be an internationally recognized researcher who has "made a groundbreaking contribution to research in the field of virology in the broadest sense" and must have an appointment at a university or research institute.

The prize is named in honor of the Dutch microbiologist Martinus Willem Beijerinck. KNAW appoints an advisory committee which gives advice to KNAW concerning the prize nominees. KNAW has regulations for who may submit nominations. Before 2014 the prize was awarded every three years.

== Prize winners ==
- 1966 Egbertus van Slogteren, Netherlands
- 1969 R.L. Sinsheimer, United States
- 1972 W. Berends, Netherlands
- 1975 E.M.J. Jaspars and A. van Kammen, Netherlands
- 1978 Lex van der Eb, Netherlands
- 1983 B.A.M. van der Zeijst, Netherlands
- 1986 Walter Fiers, Belgium
- 1989 Jan van der Noordaa, Netherlands
- 1992 H. zur Hausen, Germany
- 1996 Marian Horzinek, Netherlands/Germany
- 1998 A.D.M.E. Osterhaus, Netherlands
- 2001 R.A. Weiss, United Kingdom
- 2004 D.C. Baulcombe, United Kingdom
- 2007 Charles M. Rice, United States
- 2010 Eckard Wimmer, United States
- 2013 Félix Augusto Rey, Argentina
- 2015 Peter Palese, United States
- 2017 Raul Andino, Argentina
- 2019 Eva Harris, United States
- 2021 Ralf Bartenschlager, Germany
- 2023 Ron Fouchier, Netherlands
- 2025 John van der Oost, Netherlands
