= Herbert W. Virgin =

American pathologist and academic

Herbert W. "Skip" Virgin
- Born: Miami, Florida
- Education: Harvard University; Harvard Medical School
- Known for: Human virome; Viral pathogenesis; Autophagy; Immunology
- Scientific career
- Fields: Virology; Immunology; Genetics; Drug discovery and development
- Workplaces: Washington University School of Medicine; Vir Biotechnology; Altos labs; The Gates Foundation
- Doctoral advisor: Emil Unanue

Herbert Whiting "Skip" Virgin IV has served in academic, industry, and foundation roles related to infectious diseases, virology, immunology and genetics. He served as the Edward Mallinckrodt Professor and Chair of the Department of Pathology & Immunology at the Washington University School of Medicine and is a member of the National Academy of Sciences. He is best known for establishing murine norovirus as a model system for studying norovirus biology, for identifying host phenotypes associated with persistent viral infections, and for defining alterations to the human virome in the context of different diseases, for elucidating the roles of autophagy and interferon-stimulated genes during viral infection. He supervised the discovery of, and assisted with the development of, multiple therapeutics for infections while at Vir Biotechnology, including the monoclonal antibody sotrovimab which received emergency use authorization during the SARS-CoV-2 pandemic. He is currently leading the AI Enabled Cures Frontier program at the Gates Foundation.

== Life ==
Herbert Virgin was born in Miami, Florida and studied biology at Harvard University as an undergraduate, graduating magna cum laude. He obtained his M.D. and Ph.D. from Harvard Medical School, with his thesis work focusing on host immune responses to Listeria monocytogenes in the laboratory of Dr. Emil Unanue. He completed his residency in internal medicine at Brigham and Women's Hospital. Following post-doctoral training in the laboratory of Bernard Fields in viral genetics, he completed training in infectiouse diseases and joined the faculty of the Washington University School of Medicine. He remained at Washington University until 2018, ending his time there as Chair of the Department of Pathology & Immunology.

He is a member of the United States National Academy of Sciences, the American Society for Clinical Investigation, the Association of American Physicians and the American Academy of Microbiology. He is a past member of the board of reviewing editors at Science and Cell.

Dr. Virgin focused his research at the interface between infection, pathogen genetics, the host and host genetics. He is an author of 260 peer-reviewed articles and multiple reviews. His team's work on Crohn's disease led to increased interest in linking emerging human genetics data to drug discovery and clinical trials. Pathogen discovery efforts included the discovery of murine norovirus, the first structure and culture of a norovirus, the first protein receptor for a norovirus, and the development of norovirus genetics. They developed the concept of the mammalian virome and linked human diseases including inflammatory bowel disease, AIDS and Type 1 Diabetes to the alterations in the virome. They also showed symbiotic advantages for certain chronic infections, control of herpesvirus latency by helminthic worm infection (via regulation of key viral promoters) and the imprinting of immunity by early-life infections.

From 2009 to 2014 he served as the Director and Principal Investigator of the Midwest Regional Center of Excellence for Biodefense and Emerging Infectious Disease Research.

From 2018 to 2022 he served as Executive Vice President and Chief Scientific Officer at Vir Biotechnology and served as the Head of the Institute of Medicine (IOM) and the Chief Medical Officer at Altos Labs from 2022 to 2023, recruiting the IOM leadership team.

While at Vir, he directed drug discovery and early development programs leading to 6 new molecular entities entering the clinic in ~5 years. Sotrovimab was approved for emergency use to treat COVID-19. Two others drugs have received FDA Fast Track Status for treatment of hepatitis delta virus.

Virgin joined the Gates Foundation in 2024 as Distinguished Fellow in AI Drug Discovery and Development and Head of the AI Enabled Cures Frontier Program in the Gates Foundation Accelerator. This project is to improve drug discovery via creation of AI tools while using those tools to discover and develop drugs to cure diseases such as cervical cancer and pre-eclampsia/eclampsia.
