= Immunomics =

Genomic study of immune system regulation and pathogen response

Immunomics is the study of immune system regulation and response to pathogens using genome-wide approaches. With the rise of genomic and proteomic technologies, scientists have been able to visualize biological networks and infer interrelationships between genes and/or proteins; recently, these technologies have been used to help better understand how the immune system functions and how it is regulated. Two thirds of the genome is active in one or more immune cell types and less than 1% of genes are uniquely expressed in a given type of cell. Therefore, it is critical that the expression patterns of these immune cell types be deciphered in the context of a network, and not as an individual, so that their roles be correctly characterized and related to one another. Defects of the immune system such as autoimmune diseases, immunodeficiency, and malignancies can benefit from genomic insights on pathological processes. For example, analyzing the systematic variation of gene expression can relate these patterns with specific diseases and gene networks important for immune functions.

Traditionally, scientists studying the immune system have had to search for antigens on an individual basis and identify the protein sequence of these antigens (“epitopes”) that would stimulate an immune response. This procedure required that antigens be isolated from whole cells, digested into smaller fragments, and tested against T- and B-cells to observe T- and B- cell responses. These classical approaches could only visualize this system as a static condition and required a large amount of time and labor.

Immunomics has made this approach easier by its ability to look at the immune system as a whole and characterize it as a dynamic model. It has revealed that some of the immune system's most distinguishing features are the continuous motility, turnover, and plasticity of its constituent cells. In addition, current genomic technologies, like microarrays, can capture immune system gene expression over time and can trace interactions of microorganisms with cells of the innate immune system. New, proteomic approaches, including T-cell and B-cells-epitope mapping, can also accelerate the pace at which scientists discover antibody-antigen relationships.

== Definition ==
A host's immune system responds to pathogen invasion by a set of pathogen-specific responses in which many “players” participate; these include antibodies, T-helper cells, cytotoxic T-cells, and many others. Antigen-presenting cells (APC) are capable of internalizing pathogens and displaying a fragment of the antigen – the epitope - with major histocompatibility complexes (MHCs) on the cell surface. T-cell response is initiated when T-cells recognize these displayed epitopes. Only specific peptide sequences from some pathogen-specific antigens are needed to stimulate T- and B- cell responses; that is, the whole pathogenic peptide sequence is not necessary to initiate an immune response. The ‘immunome’ of a pathogen is described by its set of epitopes, and can be defined by comparing genome sequences and applying immunoinformatic tools.

== History ==
Ash Alizadeh et al. were some of the first to recognize the potential of cDNA microarrays to define gene expression of immune cells. Their analysis probed gene expression of human B and T lymphocytes during cellular activation and/or stimulation with cytokines, a type of signaling regulatory molecule. Many of the activated genes in stimulated T lymphocytes were known to be involved in the G0/G1 cell cycle transition or encoding for chemokines, signaling molecules involved in inflammatory response. This team was also able to visualize temporal patterns of gene expression during T cell mitogenesis. In the concluding paragraphs of their landmark paper, these scientists state “virtually every corner of immunological research will benefit from cDNA microarray analysis of gene expression,” and, thus, heralded the rise of immunomics.

Limited by available microarrays and a non-complete human genome at this point in time, this same set of researchers were motivated to create a specialized microarray that focused on genes preferentially expressed in a given cell type, or known to be functionally important in a given biological process. As a result, Alizadeh and colleagues designed the “Lymphochip” cDNA microarray, which contained 13,000 genes and was enriched for genes of importance to the immune system.

Iyer et al.’s 1999 article was another to reveal the importance of applying genomic technologies to immunological research. Although not intending to address any aspect of immunity at the start of their experiment, these researchers observed that the expression profiles of serum-stimulated fibroblasts were far richer than anticipated and suggested an important physiological role for fibroblasts in healing wounds. The serum-induced genes have been associated with processes relevant to wound healing, including genes directly involved in remodeling the clot and extracellular matrix, as well as genes encoding signal proteins for inflammation, the development of new blood vessels, and regrowth of epithelial tissue. Additionally, one of the most significant results of this expression analysis was the discovery of more than 200 previously unknown genes whose expression was temporally regulated during the response of fibroblasts to serum. These results revealed the importance of viewing the immune response as a collaborative physiological program and begged for further study of the immune system as a network, and not just as individual pieces.

In 2006, Moutaftsi et al. demonstrated that epitope-mapping tools could accurately identify the epitopes responsible for 95% of the murine T-cell response to vaccinia virus. Through their work, these scientists introduced the interdisciplinary realm of informatics and immunology while employing genomic, proteomic, and immunological data. The striking success and ease of this method encouraged researchers both to define the immunome of other pathogens, and to measure the breadth and overlap of pathogen immunomes that give rise to immunity. Additionally, it suggested other applications in which epitope-mapping tools could be used including autoimmunity, transplantation, and immunogenicity.

== Technologies used ==
=== Immunomic microarrays ===
Several types of microarrays have been created to specifically observe the immune system response and interactions. Antibody microarrays use antibodies as probes and antigens as targets. They can be used to directly measure the antigen concentrations for which the antibody probes are specific. Peptide microarrays use antigen peptides as probes and serum antibodies as targets. These can be used for functional immunomic applications to the understanding of autoimmune diseases and allergies, definition of B-cell epitopes, vaccine studies, detection assays, and analysis of antibody specificity. MHC microarrays are the most recent development in immunomic arrays and use peptide-MHC complexes and their co-stimulatory molecules as probes and T-cell populations as targets. Bound T-cells are activated and secrete cytokines, which are captured by specific detection antibodies. This microarray can map MHC-restricted T cell epitopes.

==== Lymphochip ====
The Lymphochip: A specialized cDNA microarray

The Lymphochip is a specialized human cDNA microarray enriched for genes related to immune function and created by Ash Alizadeh at Stanford University. 17,853 cDNA clones were taken from three sources. The first set of clones were selected if identified expressed sequence tags (ESTs) were unique or enriched specifically in lymphoid cDNA libraries; these represent ~80% of the Lymphochip clones. The second set of clones was identified during first-generation microarray analysis of immune responses. Finally, 3,183 genes that are known or suspected to have roles in immune function, oncogenesis, apoptosis, cell proliferation, or being open reading frames from pathogenic human viruses were used on the Lymphochip. New genes are frequently being added.

=== T- and- B-cell-epitope mapping tools ===
Epitope mapping identifies the sites of antibodies to which their target antigens bind. In the past, scientists would have to isolate antigens, digest them into smaller fragments, and determine which of these fragments stimulated T- and B- cell responses to define an antibody's epitope. Immunomics harnesses the power of bioinformatics and offers mapping algorithms that accelerate the discovery of epitope sequences. These algorithms are relevant to vaccine design and for characterizing and modifying immune responses in the context of autoimmunity, endocrinology, allergy, transplantation, diagnostics and engineering of therapeutic proteins.

T-cell and B-cell epitope mapping algorithms can computationally predict epitopes based on the genomic sequence of pathogens, without prior knowledge of a protein's structure or function. A series of steps are used to identify epitopes:

1. Comparison between virulent and avirulent organisms identify candidate genes that code for epitopes that solicit T-cell responses by looking for sequences that are unique to virulent strains. Additionally, differential microarray technologies can discover pathogen-specific genes that are upregulated during host-interaction and may be relevant for analysis because they are critical to the function of the pathogen.
2. Immunoinformatics tools predict regions of these candidate genes that interact with T cells by scanning genome-derived protein sequences of a pathogen.
3. These predicted peptides are synthesized and used in in vitro screening against T cells. Recognizing a positive immune response can suggest that this peptide contains an epitope that stimulates immune response in the course of natural infection or disease.

==== Available mapping tools ====
- EpiMatrix
- TEPITOPE
- Multipred
- MHC Thread
- MHCPred
- NetMHC
- LpPep
- BIMAS

=== Tetramer staining by flow cytometry ===
The guiding principle behind flow cytometry is that cells or subcellular particles are tagged with fluorescent probes are passed through a laser beam and sorted by the strength of fluorescence emitted by cells contained in the droplets. MHC [[tetramer staining]] by flow cytometry identifies and isolates specific T cells based on the binding specificity of their cell surface receptors with fluorescently-tagged MHC-peptide complexes.

=== ELISPOT ===
ELISPOT is a modified version of the ELISA immunoassay and is a common method of monitoring immune responses.

== Contributions to understanding the immune system ==
Immunomics has made a considerable impact on the understanding of the immune system by uncovering differences in gene expression profiles of cell types, characterizing immune response, illuminating immune cell lineages and relationship, and establishing gene regulatory networks. Whereas the following list of contributions is not complete, it is meant to demonstrate the broad application of immunomic research and powerful consequences on immunology.

=== Immune cell activation and differentiation ===
==== B lymphocyte anergy ====
Microarrays have discovered gene expression patterns that correlate with antigen-induced activation or anergy in B lymphocytes. Lymphocyte anergy pathways involve induction of some, but not all of the signaling pathways used during lymphocyte activation. For example, NFAT and MAPK/ERK kinase pathways are expressed in anergic (or “tolerant) cell lines, whereas NF-kB and c-Jun N-terminal kinases pathways are not. Of the 300 genes that were altered in expression after antigen-stimulated naïve B cells, only 8 of these genes were regulated in tolerant B cells. Understanding these “tolerance” pathways have important implications for designing immunosuppressive drugs. These gene expression signatures of tolerant B cells could be used during drug screens to probe for compounds that mimic the functional effects of natural tolerance.

==== Lymphocyte differentiation ====
Gene expression profiles during human lymphocyte differentiation has followed mature, naïve B cells from their resting state through germinal center reactions and into terminal differentiation. These studies have shown that germinal center B cells represent a distinct stage in differentiation because the gene expression profile is different from activated peripheral B cells. Although no in vitro culture system has been able to induce resting peripheral B cells to adopt a full germinal center phenotype, these gene expression profiles can be used to measure the success of in vitro cultures in mimicking the germinal center state as they are being developed.

==== Lymphoid malignancies ====
About 9 of every 10 human lymphoid cancers derive from B cells. Distinct immunome-wide expression patterns in a large number of diffuse large cell lymphoma (DLCL)– the most common form of non-Hodgkin's lymphoma – have identified at least two different subtypes in what was previously thought to be a single disease. One subset of these DLCLs shows a similar gene expression pattern to that of normal germinal center B cells and implies that the tumor cell originated from a germinal center B cell. Other surveys of B cell malignancies show that follicular lymphomas share expression features with germinal center B cells, whereas chronic lymphocytic leukemia cells resemble resting peripheral blood lymphocytes. Furthermore, heterogeneity in each of these cell lines also suggest that different subtypes exist within each type of lymphoma, just as it has been shown in DLCL. Such knowledge can be used to direct patients to the most appropriate therapy.

=== Immune response ===
==== Macrophage responses to bacteria ====
Microarrays have analyzed global responses of macrophages to different microorganisms and have confirmed that these responses sustain and control inflammatory processes, and also kill microorganisms. These independent studies have been able to better describe how macrophages mount attacks against different microorganisms. A “core transcriptional response” was observed to induce 132 genes and repress 59 genes. Induced genes include pro-inflammatory chemokines and cytokines, and their respective receptors. A “pathogen-specific response” was also observed.

==== Dendritic response to pathogen ====
Dendritic cells (DCs) help macrophages sustain inflammatory processes and participate in the innate immune system response, but can also prime adaptive immunity. Gene expression analyses have shown that DCs can “multi-task” by temporally segregating their different functions. Soon after recognizing an infectious agent, immature DCs transition to a state of early activation via a core response characterized by rapid downregulation of genes involved with pathogen recognition and phagocytosis, upregulation of cytokine and chemokine genes to recruit other immune cells to the side of inflammations; and expression of genes that control migratory capacity. Early activated DCs are enabled to migrate from non-lymphoid tissues to lymph nodes, where they can prime T-cell responses. These early DCs responses are related to innate immunity and consist of the “core transcriptional response” of DCs. Pathogen-specific responses have a stronger influence on the DC's ability to regulate adaptive immunity.

=== Distinguishing immune cell types ===
Comparing distinctions between immune cells’ overall transcriptional program can generate plots that position each cell type to best reflect its expression profile relative to all other cells and can reveal interesting relationships between cell types. For example, the transcriptional profiles from thymic medullary epithelial immune cells mapped closer to lymphocytes than to other epithelia. This can suggest that a functional interaction exists between these two cells type and requires the sharing of particular transcripts and proteins. When comparing gene expression profiles from cells of the blood system, T-cell and B-cell subsets tightly group with their respective cell types.

By looking at the transcriptional profile of different T-cells, scientists have shown that natural killer T-cells are a close variant of conventional CD4+ T cells, rather than an intermediary cell-type between T cells and natural killer cells. Additionally, DCs, natural killer cells, and B cells are tightly grouped based on their global expression profiles. It may have been expected that B lymphocytes and T lymphocytes would cluster separately from each other, or that natural killer cells would be more closely related to T cells because they share common precursors, cytolytic activity, and similar activation markers. Therefore, immunomics has established relationship between cell lineages that depart from classical views. Additionally, it may better explain the observed plasticity in lymphoid and myeloid cell differentiation because of the considerable overlap between global expression profiles of these different lineages.

=== Immune cell regulatory networks ===
Networks represent the broadest level of genetic interactions and aim to link all genes and transcripts in the immunological genome. Cellular phenotypes and differentiation states are ultimately established by the activity of these networks of co-regulated genes. One of the most complete networks in immunology has deciphered regulatory connections among normal and transformed human B cells. This analysis suggests a hierarchical network where a small number of highly connected genes (called “hubs”) regulated most interactions. Proto-oncogene MYC emerged as a major hub and highly influential regulator for B cells. Notably, MYC was found to directly control BYSL, a highly conserved, but poorly characterized gene, and is the largest hub in the whole B cell network. This suggests that BYSL encodes an important cellular molecule and a critical effecter of MYC function, and motivates additional studies to elucidate its function. Therefore, using gene expression data to create networks can reveal genes highly influential in immune cell differentiation that pre-genomic technologies had not yet identified.

== Practical applications ==
=== Vaccine development ===
As quoted by Stefania Bambini and Rino Rappuoli, “New powerful genomics technologies have increased the number of disease that can be addressed by vaccination, and decreased the time for discover research and vaccine development.” The availability of complete genome sequences of pathogens in combination with high-throughput genomics technologies have helped to accelerate vaccine development. Reverse vaccinology uses genomic sequences of viral, bacterial, or parasitic pathogens to identify genes potentially encoding genes that promote pathogenesis. The first application of reverse vaccinology identified vaccine candidates against Neisseria meningitidis serogroup B. Computational tools identified 600 putative surface-exposed or secreted proteins from the complete genome sequence of a MenB pathogenic strain, on the basis of sequence features. These putative proteins were expressed in E. coli, purified, and used to immunize mice. Tests using mice immune sera estimated the ability of antibodies to protect against these proteins. The proteins able to solicit a robust immune response were checked for sequence conservation across a panel of meningitides strains and allowed for further selection of antigen able to elicit an immune response against most strains in the panel. On the basis of these antigen sequences, scientists have been able to develop a universal “cocktail” vaccine against Neisseria meninitidis that uses five antigens to promote immunity. Similar approaches have been used for a variety of other human pathogens, such as Streptococcus pneumoniae, Chlamydia pneumoniae, Bacillus anthracis, Porphyromonas gingivalis, Mycobacterium tuberculosis, Helicobacter pylori, amongst others. Additionally, studies have started for the development of vaccines against viruses.

=== Disease diagnosis ===
The inventory of receptors and signal transduction pathways that immune cells use to monitor and defend the body gives rise to signature patterns of altered gene expression in peripheral blood cells that reflect the character of the infection or injury. Therefore, recognizing characteristic expression profiles of peripheral blood cells may be a powerful diagnostic tool by recruiting these cells as “spies” to detect occult diseases or agents that cannot be readily cultured from the host.

For example, cytomegalovirus (CMV) infection of fibroblasts and HTLV-I infection of T lymphocytes revealed distinct gene expression profiles. CMV infection provoked a unique interferon response whereas HTLV-1 infection induced NF-kB target genes. A type of white blood cells have also been tested again bacterial exposures and immunome expression varied based on the type of bacterial strain used.

Monitoring the change of peripheral blood gene expression can also help determine the course of infection and help treat patients with a therapy tailored to their disease stage. This approach has already been used against sepsis – a disease that progresses through a predictable line of events. Changes gene expression signatures may precede clinical exacerbation of symptoms, like in multiple sclerosis, and allow physicians to nip these “flare-ups” in the bud.

== Immunological genome project ==
The immune system is a network of genetic and signaling pathways connected by a network of interacting cells. The Immunological Genome Project seeks to generate a complete compendium of protein-coding gene expression for all cell populations in the mouse immune system. It analyzes both steady-state conditions within different cell populations, and in response to genetic and/or environmental perturbations created by natural genetic polymorphism, gene knock-out, gene knock-down by RNAi, or drug treatment. Computational tools to reverse-engineer or predict immune cell regulatory networks use these expression profiles.

By 2008, the ImmGen project involved seven immunology and three computational biology laboratories across the United States and over 200 cell populations involved in the immune system had been identified and described. This consortium has created a data browser to explore the expression patterns of particular genes, networks of co-regulated genes, and genes that can reliably distinguish cell types. Raw data is also accessible from the NCBI's Gene Expression Omnibus.

== Databases ==
- Immune Response in silico (IRIS)
- Reference Database of Immune Cells
- Immunological Genome Project
- Immune Epitope Database and Analysis Resource (IEDB)
- IMGT
- SYFPEiTHi
- AniJen
- MHCBN
- IPD
- Epitome
- Allergome

== See also ==
- Immunoproteomics
