= Paul Eston Lacy =

American anatomist (1924–2005)

- Born: February 7, 1924; Trinway, Ohio, United States
- Died: February 15, 2005 (age 81)
- Education: Ohio State University (B.S. & M.D.); University of Minnesota (Ph.D.)
- Known for: Research in diabetes mellitus
- Scientific career
- Fields: Anatomy; Experimental Pathology
- Workplaces: Washington University in St. Louis

Paul Eston Lacy (February 7, 1924 – February 15, 2005) was an anatomist and experimentalist and one of the world’s leading diabetes mellitus researchers. He is often credited as the originator of islet transplantation.

== Education ==
Lacy was born in Trinway, Ohio in February, 1924. He was educated at the Ohio State University in Columbus, Ohio, both as an undergraduate and a medical student, obtaining B.S. and M.D. degrees in 1944 and 1948, respectively. From there Lacy matriculated to the Mayo Clinic and Mayo Foundation in Rochester, Minnesota, for graduate work in anatomy and experimental pathology. He was awarded a Ph.D. in that discipline by the University of Minnesota in 1955.

== Career ==
In 1955, Lacy was appointed assistant professor in the Department of Anatomy at Washington University School of Medicine, St. Louis, Missouri. He undertook research into the characterization of endocrine cells in the pancreas, using ultrastructural and fluorescent-antibody-labeling methods. That work resulted in a better understanding of how beta cells in the pancreatic islets of Langerhans produced and exported insulin, and it steadily propelled Lacy through the academic ranks.

In 1961, Lacy was named the sixth chairman of Pathology at Washington University, having been preceded by Eugene Lindsay Opie, Leo Loeb, Howard McCordock, Robert Alan Moore, and Stanley Hartroft. The last of those individuals had concentrated his efforts almost exclusively at building a strong research program in the department, and Lacy furthered that process. Indeed, never having been trained in a clinical patient-care specialty, he took only passing interest in surgical pathology or laboratory medicine. Lauren Ackerman—one of the preeminent surgical pathologists of all time—was concurrently a faculty member in the Department of Surgery at Washington University. Ultimately, Lacy invited Ackerman to join his department; subsequently, the two had a reasonably cordial but somewhat-distant professional relationship for the next decade.

Throughout the 1960s and early 1970s, Lacy collaborated with Walter F. Ballinger, chairperson of Surgery at Washington University, on the experimental technique of beta islet-cell transplantation in animals as a treatment for diabetes mellitus. In 1989, that work eventuated in the first successful islet-cell transplant in a human being. Research into the procedure continues, but it has still not been approved by the U.S. Food and Drug Administration as a mainstream clinical therapy.

Lacy stepped down from his Pathology chairmanship in 1984, and was succeeded by Emil Unanue. Lacy remained on the Washington University faculty and retained an active role in diabetes research for another 20 years.

== Personal life ==
Lacy had a keen interest in literature, art, and music. He was married to his first wife, Ellen, for more than 50 years; the couple had two sons. Ellen died in 1998 of lung cancer. In 2002, Lacy married Bonnie Mattingly. The following year, Lacy developed usual interstitial pneumonia (idiopathic pulmonary fibrosis) that took his life on February 15, 2005.
