= Shane Crotty =

Immunologist and professor

- Born: Shane Patrick Crotty; January 26, 1974
- Education: Massachusetts Institute of Technology; University of California, San Francisco
- Scientific career
- Fields: Immunology; Vaccinology; Virology
- Workplaces: La Jolla Institute for Immunology
- Thesis: Polio Is (Still) Not Dead: Vaccine Vectors, Antiviral Drugs, Pathogenesis, and Unexpected Mutants (2001)
- Doctoral advisor: Raul Andino
- Website: www.lji.org/labs/crotty/

Shane Patrick Crotty (born 26 January 1974) is a professor of immunology in the Center for Infectious Disease and Vaccine Research at the La Jolla Institute for Immunology.

== Education and academic posts ==
Crotty completed B.S. degrees in Biology and Writing from Massachusetts Institute of Technology in 1996. He then completed his Ph.D. in 2001 at the University of California, San Francisco with Raul Andino.

Crotty went on to a postdoctoral fellowship from 2001 to 2003 with Rafi Ahmed at Emory University Vaccine Center studying immunity to viruses. He joined the La Jolla Institute for Immunology (LJI) in 2003, as well as the department of medicine of University of California, San Diego, in 2004 as an adjunct assistant professor. He became an associate member with tenure at LJI in 2009, and then a tenured professor.

== Research ==
Crotty's research has focused on immune responses to viral infections, in particular those driven by vaccines. His lab has done major work on the regulation and proliferation of follicular helper T cells, as well as immunological protection from HIV infection and HIV vaccine delivery strategy. In close collaboration with Alessandro Sette, Crotty published the first detailed analysis of the human immune response to SARS-CoV-2, the virus that causes COVID-19, and later confirmed that the adaptive immune response is lasting.

In 2020, Crotty joined the LJI Coronavirus Taskforce to study immune system responses with an aim of informing vaccines and therapies against the novel coronavirus, SARS-CoV-2. His lab studies the adaptive immune response against SARS-CoV-2. In May 2020, his lab co-published the first detailed analysis of how the immune system responds to SARS-CoV-2, with LJI Professor Alessandro Sette. This research suggested that the human body may be capable of long-term immunity to SARS-CoV-2 following infection or vaccine administration. Crotty has since published research showing that "uncoordinated" immune cell responses are related to COVID-19 case severity. His lab has also collaborated with Sette to show that T cells that react to common cold coronaviruses can also recognize SARS-CoV-2. Crotty has warned that this T-cell immunity does not equal protection against the virus.

== Major publications ==
- Choi YS, Kageyama R, Eto D, Escobar TC, Johnston RJ, Monticelli L, Lao C, Crotty S (2011). "ICOS Receptor Instructs T Follicular Helper Cell versus Effector Cell Differentiation via Induction of the Transcriptional Repressor Bcl6". Immunity. 34 (6): 932–946. doi:10.1016/j.immuni.2011.03.023. PMC 3124577. PMID 21636296.
- Johnston RJ, Poholek AC, Ditoro D, Yusuf I, Eto D, Barnett B, Dent AL, Craft J, Crotty S (2009). "Bcl6 and Blimp-1 Are Reciprocal and Antagonistic Regulators of T Follicular Helper Cell Differentiation". Science. 325 (5943): 1006–1010. Bibcode:2009Sci...325.1006J. doi:10.1126/science.1175870. PMC 2766560. PMID 19608860.
- Crotty S, Felgner P, Davies H, Glidewell J, Villarreal L, Ahmed R (2003). "Cutting Edge: Long-Term B Cell Memory in Humans after Smallpox Vaccination". The Journal of Immunology. 171 (10): 4969–4973. doi:10.4049/jimmunol.171.10.4969. PMID 14607890. S2CID 32215286.
- Crotty S, Cameron CE, Andino R (2001). "RNA virus error catastrophe: Direct molecular test by using ribavirin". Proceedings of the National Academy of Sciences. 98 (12): 6895–6900. Bibcode:2001PNAS...98.6895C. doi:10.1073/pnas.111085598. PMC 34449. PMID 11371613.
- Crotty S, Maag D, Arnold JJ, Zhong W, Lau JY, Hong Z, Andino R, Cameron CE (2000). "The broad-spectrum antiviral ribonucleoside ribavirin is an RNA virus mutagen". Nature Medicine. 6 (12): 1375–1379. doi:10.1038/82191. PMID 11100123. S2CID 52870674.

== Other publications ==
Crotty is also the author of a biography of David Baltimore entitled Ahead of the Curve. He is the co-editor with Rafi Ahmed of Immune Memory and Vaccines: Great Debates.
