= Ab van Kammen =

Dutch molecular biologist and virologist

Albert "Ab" van Kammen (7 September 1932 – 1 March 2023) was a Dutch molecular biologist and virologist. He was a professor of molecular biology at Wageningen University and Research between 1972 and 1996.

== Life ==
Van Kammen was born on 7 September 1932 in Amsterdam. He studied organic chemistry at the University of Amsterdam and followed a minor in plant physiology. In 1958 he started working on his doctorate at the laboratory of virology at the Landbouwhogeschool with research on the Tobacco mosaic virus. He obtained his doctorate in chemistry at the University of Amsterdam in 1963 under professor J.P.H. Want with a thesis titled: "Occurrence of infectious virus ribonucleic acid in the ribosomal fraction from tobacco mosaic virus infected tobacco leaves". Late 1963 he went to the University of California, Berkeley to become acquainted with the most recent research into viruses. In 1965 he returned to the Netherlands and started research into Cowpea mosaic virus. In 1969 he became associate professor at the Landbouwhogeschool.

In 1972 van Kammen was the first person to be appointed as professor of molecular biology at the Landbouwhogeschool. He also became the founder of the laboratorium of molecular biology. During the start of his career as professor he focused on plants and cellular differentiation in particular. He retired in September 1996. He was chair of the Foundation for Chemistry Research in the Netherlands (Dutch:Stichting Scheikundig Onderzoek in Nederland) between 1991 and 1994.

In 1975 van Kammen together with E.M.J. Jaspars was winner of the Beijerinck Virology Prize. He was elected a member of the European Molecular Biology Organization in 1987. Van Kammen was elected a member of the Royal Netherlands Academy of Arts and Sciences in 1991.

Van Kammen was married to Dutch publicist Anne-Ruth Wertheim, the couple had several daughters. They later divorced. Van Kammen died on 1 March 2023 in The Hague, aged 90.
