= Eckard Wimmer =

- Born: 22 May 1936 (age 90); Berlin, Germany
- Education: Göttingen University
- Known for: First de novo synthesis of Poliovirus
- Awards: M.W. Beijerinck Virology Prize 2011; Koch Gold Medal 2012
- Scientific career
- Fields: Biology, Virology
- Workplaces: Stony Brook University
- Website: www.mgm.stonybrook.edu/wimmer

Eckard Wimmer (born 22 May 1936) is a German American virologist, organic chemist and distinguished professor of molecular genetics and microbiology at Stony Brook University. He is best known for his seminal work on the molecular biology of poliovirus and the first chemical synthesis of a viral genome capable of infection and subsequent production of live viruses.

== Life and career ==
Eckard Albert Friedrich Wimmer was born on May 22, 1936, in Berlin, Germany. At the onset of World War II, when Wimmer was three his father died; when he was nine his mother fled together with him and his two older brothers to Saxony, East Germany, where he finished elementary school and high school. He studied chemistry at the University of Rostock from 1953 to 1956, and then fled to West Germany to continue his Chemistry studies at University of Göttingen. In 1962 he earned the degree of Doctor rerum naturalium (Dr. rer. nat.) in the organic chemistry of natural products under the guidance of Hans Brockmann.

Wimmer worked at the University of Göttingen as a research associate and instructor until 1964. Intrigued by the chemistry of living cells, however, he shifted his research interests in 1964 and joined Gordon Tener at the Department of Biochemistry of the University of British Columbia in Vancouver, British Columbia, Canada, to study transfer RNA. Then in 1966 he worked in the US with Manfred E. Reichmann in the Department of Botany at the University of Illinois to study plant viruses.

In 1968, during a five-months visit in David Baltimore's laboratory at MIT, Wimmer was introduced to poliovirus, which became the infectious agent of his choice. Between 1968 and 1974 he taught and conducted research in the Department of Microbiology in the Saint Louis University School of Medicine in Missouri. He and his family moved to Stony Brook University on Long Island, NY, in 1974 to join the Department of Microbiology, School of Medicine, an academic environment in which he continued to engage. In 1979 he was promoted to professor at Stony Brook University, and from 1984 to 1999 he served as the Chairman of the Department. Wimmer was honored as a Distinguished Professor of the State University of New York at Stony Brook in 2002.

Wimmer is married since 1965 to Astrid née Brose, a German physical therapist, who earned her Ph.D. in Comparative Literature at Stony Brook University in 1988. They have two children.

== Research interests ==
Originally trained as an organic chemist, Wimmer developed a deep understanding and fascination for viruses as replicating (living) biological entities as well as (non-living) aggregates of organic compounds, or, "as chemicals with a life cycle". After working on the structure of tRNAs and the structure of a plant RNA virus (satellite tobacco necrosis virus), Wimmer chose to study poliovirus in 1968. Poliovirus is the cause of the horrific disease poliomyelitis, which can cause irreversible flaccid paralysis and even death. Neither the molecular biology of poliovirus proliferation nor the mechanism of its pathogenesis was understood in the nineteen sixties.

Wimmer's major early accomplishment, spearheaded by Naomi Kitamura and other members of his laboratory, was the elucidation in 1981 of the structure and genetic organization of the poliovirus genome, the first sequence of a eukaryotic RNA virus. The primary structure of the genome was unique at the time amongst RNA viruses as it was 3'' polyadenylated and 5' covalently linked to a protein called VPg. VPg was later shown by Aniko Paul to be a primer in RNA replication. The resulting gene map provided irrefutable evidence for the existence of the polyprotein, the only polypeptide that poliovirus synthesizes. Polyproteins, first postulated by David Baltimore, are a hallmark of gene expression in many viruses and in all retroviruses. Wimmer's lab not only provided proof of the polyprotein but also largely identified the pathway by which the polyprotein is processed into functional polypeptides, where Bert L. Semler showed that the cleavages occur predominantly at evolutionary preserved Q^G sites. These studies were the basis for the discovery of the "internal ribosome entry site" (IRES) in a picornavirus genome by Sung Key Jang (1988), independently described also by Nahum Sonenberg and his colleagues. IRES elements allow initiation of protein synthesis in a cap-independent manner, which violates a long-standing dogma in protein synthesis of eukaryotic cells. IRESes have now found widespread recognition in cell biology and application in biotechnology. An IRES chimeric oncolytic poliovirus [PV (RIPO)], originally constructed in Wimmer's laboratory, has now been developed by Matthias Gromeier at Duke University for the treatment of human glioma.

Wimmer is co-discoverer of the poliovirus receptor CD155, a cell-adhesion molecule and tumor antigen, whose expression is regulated by the sonic hedgehog pathway. A decade-long collaboration with Michael Rossmann's laboratory and Steffen Mueller in Wimmer's lab has yielded the crystal structure of the two outer domains of CD155, an achievement that has solved the architecture of the poliovirus/receptor complex.

In 1991, Molla, Paul and Wimmer published the first de novo, cell-free synthesis of any virus. This experiment has led to biochemical studies of the complete poliovirus life cycle in cytoplasmic extracts of naïve mammalian cells. Many investigators have since used this strategy involving a cell "juice" void of the barrier of a cellular membrane, of nuclei or of mitochondria, for the study of key steps in poliovirus translation and genome replication.

Using the nucleotide sequence of the genome deciphered in 1981, Wimmer followed up on the work published in 1991 by synthesizing chemically the genome in the form of double stranded DNA ("cDNA"), which was then transcribed enzymatically into genome RNA and "booted to life" in the cell free system. This work, published in 2002 by Cello, Paul and Wimmer, was the first test-tube synthesis of an organism in the absence of a natural template achieved outside living cells. The poliovirus synthesis caught global attention, high praise, ridicule and fierce condemnation. Several years later, Wimmer published an essay in EMBO Reports reflecting on hotly debated issues that this new kind of research generated (ethical matters, questions about the global eradication of poliovirus, concerns of "dual use research"). Apart from providing a 'proof of principle,' the experiment heralded the total synthesis of organisms with computers as parents, a strategy that allows investigating the structure and function of an organism's biology to an extent hitherto impossible. Meanwhile, synthetic biology has led to a new kind of RNA virus genetics and has been used to develop rapid methods for computer-aided chemical synthesis of viral recoded genomes. This strategy allows for the generation of new vaccines in a very short time.

Recently, Wimmer's lab has elucidated the key step in the morphogenesis of poliovirus that has been elusive for decades.

== Awards and honors ==
- Loeffler-Frosch Medaille 2014 by the Gesellschaft für Virologie of Germany, Austria and Switzerland (2014)
- National Academy of Sciences (2012).
- Robert-Koch-Stiftung Berlin (2012)
- American Association for the Advancement of Science (2009)
- Deutsche Akademie der Naturforscher Leopoldina von 1652 (1998)
- American Academy of Microbiology (1994)
- Robert-Koch-Medal in Gold for Lifelong Achievements in Infectious Diseases from the Robert-Koch-Stiftung, Berlin (2012)
- Certificate of Special Congressional Recognition. 2012.
- Village Times Herald "Man of the Year in Medicine" (2012).
- M.W. Beijerinck Virology Prize from the Royal Dutch Academy of Arts and Sciences (2011)
- Lifetime Achievement Award, The Research Foundation of the State University of New York (April 2008)
- Distinguished Professor of Stony Brook University (2002)
- Alexander von Humboldt Forschungspreis (1996)
- NIH Merit Awards (1988, 1998)
- Highly Cited Researcher, Institute for Scientific Information (1981–present)

== Bibliography ==
- Viral Genetics. Guest editors Eckard Wimmer and Rob Goldbach. In "Current Opinion in Genetics & Development". Current Biology LTD. Vol. 2, No. 1, 1992
- Cellular Receptors for Animal Viruses. Edited by Eckard Wimmer. Cold Spring Harbor Laboratory Press. Cold Spring Harbor, NY, 1994
- RNA Signals in Entero- and Rhinovirus Genome Replication. In: "Seminars in Virology". Guest Editor Eckard Wimmer. Academic Press. Vol. 8, 1997.
- Molecular Biology of Picornaviruses. Edited by Bert L. Semler and Eckard Wimmer. ASM Press, Washington, DC, 2002.
- Exploring the Role of Antiviral Drugs in the Eradication of Polio. Workshop Report 2006. S.L. Katz, R. Andino, D. Joseph-McCarthy, J. F. Modlin, N. Nathanson, R. J. Whitley, E. Wimmer. National Research Council (National Academy of Sciences); National Academies Press Washington, DC, USA
- Picornaviren – Grundlagen. Eckard Wimmer und Aniko Paul. "Medizinische Virologie, 2nd ed., W.H. Gerlach and H.W. Doer, Eds., Georg Thieme Verlag, 2009. (in German)

== See also ==
- Synthesis of Poliovirus
