= Egbertus van Slogteren =

Dutch professor of horticulture and phytopathology

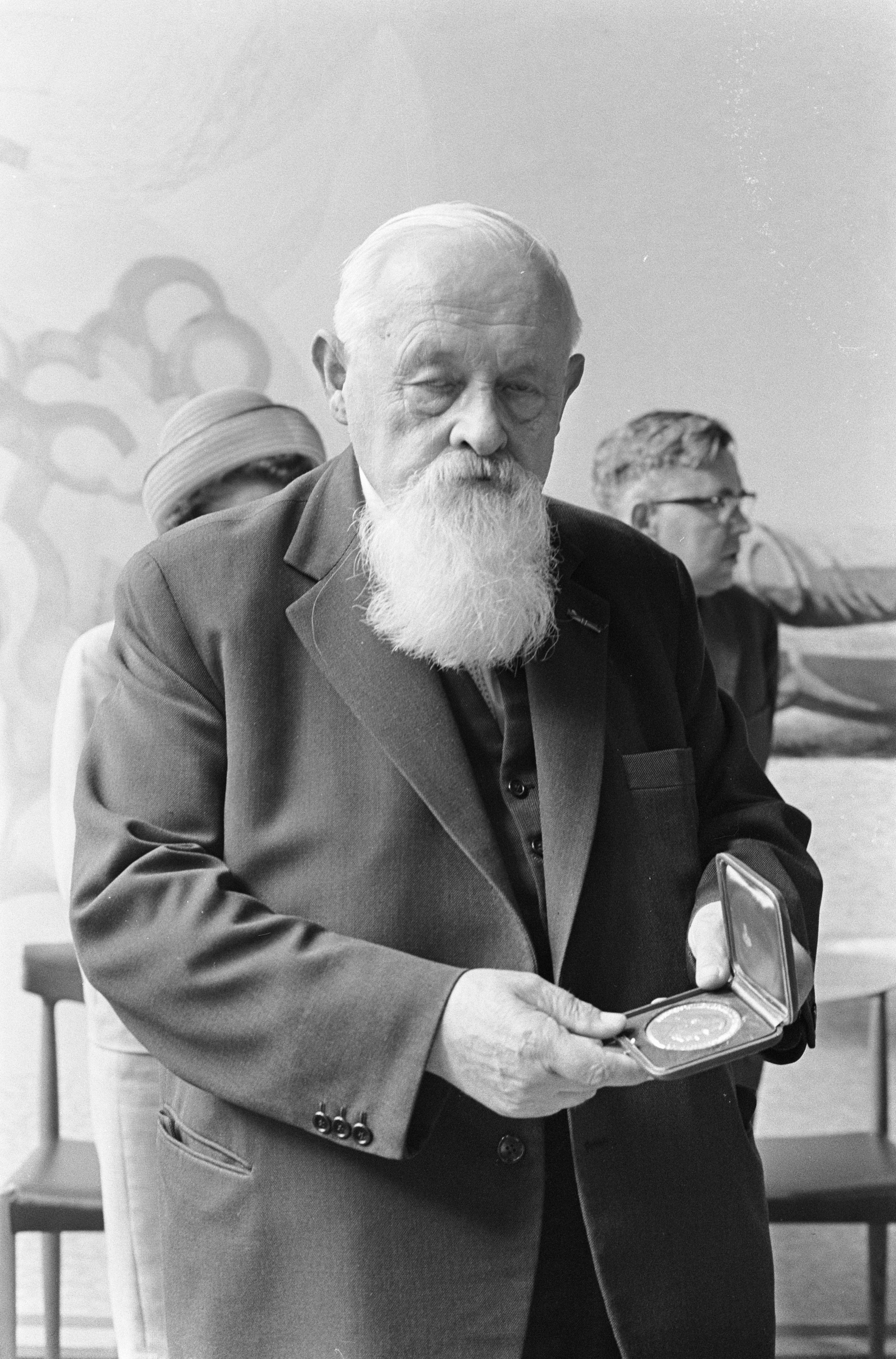
Egbertus van Slogteren in 1966

Egbertus "Egbert" van Slogteren (9 April 1888 in Groningen – 17 October 1968 in Haarlem) was a Dutch professor of horticulture and phytopathology, known for his research on flower bulbs and diagnosis of viral diseases in plants.

== Biography ==
Egbert van Slogteren grew up in Groningen. After graduating from the Groningen Gymnasium in 1907, he studied botany and zoology at the University of Groningen, where he graduated in 1911. From 1911 to 1915 he worked as an assistant to Professor Jan Willem Moll, who became his doctoral advisor. In 1917 Van Slogteren obtained from the University of Groningen his doctorate degree cum laude with dissertation De gasbeweging door het blad in verband met stomata en intercellulaire ruimten (The gas movement through the leaf associated with stomata and intercellular spaces).

From 1 August 1914 to 1 April 1917 he was a reserve officer in the infantry. After he was given leave from the infantry, he became on 11 April 1917 a wetenschappelijk ambtenaar (scientific official) assigned to the Institute for Phytopathology in Wageningen. Within a few years he discovered that the stem nematodes that damage daffodil flower bulbs could be killed by immersing daffodil bulbs in water at 43 °C. for approximately 4 hours, without damaging the bulbs. He found that the warm water treatment against stem nematodes also worked for other bulbous plants. Furthermore, the warm water treatment also killed insects, mites, and fungi. He also developed a hot air treatment that killed the bacteria which caused the "yellow or new disease' in hyacinth bulbs.

In 1922, Van Slogteren became in Lisse the director of the newly constructed Laboratorium voor Bloembollenonderzoek (Laboratory for Flower Bulb Research). Flower bulb cultivation in the Netherlands has considerable economic importance. At the Agricultural College in Wageningen, he was appointed in 1925 a professor extraordinarius and was promoted in 1953 to professor ordinarius. In addition to his scientific research, he travelled thousands of kilometres each year to establish and maintain contact with flower bulb growers. He did lengthy experiments to find treatments to enable optimal flowering of hyacinth, tulip, and narcissus bulbs. Van Slogteren's laboratory was the first in the Netherlands to introduce the method of using steam to disinfect soil contaminated with pests.

As a representative of the Dutch growers, Van Slogteren travelled five times to the United States to protest against import restrictions. During international plant protection conferences, he strongly opposed quarantine measures. In 1930 he started his research to prevent viral diseases that cause growth disorders in the flower bulb crops. The Laboratory for Flower Bulb Research developed the method of serological diagnostics, which has its origins in medical science. By injecting the plant virus into the body of a rabbit or horse, an antiserum is created in the blood, which can be used to diagnose whether the plant is infected and, if so, by which plant virus. Strict selection of the planting material can then effectively eliminate viral diseases.

After the successes with flower bulbs, plant virologists prepared an antiserum for the diagnosis of yellowing disease in sugar beet (cultivars of Beta vulgaris). In 1944, Van Slogteren and colleagues began research on diagnosing viral diseases in potatoes. Such research made it possible to obtain healthy potato seed potatoes, but also led to the discovery of new viruses, including the 'S (=Van Slogteren) virus', by the serological-diagnostic method. The serological-diagnostic method was also successful for other crops, such as dahlias, tomatoes and onions. In 1948 the Food and Agriculture Organization (FAO) of the United Nations recommended sending Van Slogteren to the Gold Coast (now the Republic of Ghana) to study and analyse "swollen shoot disease", a viral disease in cocoa plants. He successfully completed this mission.

In 1915, in Eelde he married Jacoba Hermina van Lessen (1886–1964). They had two daughters and a son.

In 1935, Egbertus van Slogteren was one of about two dozen plant pathologists who attended the 6th International Botanical Congress held in Amsterdam. He wrote many scientific papers, not only in Dutch, but some in French and English.

In 1953 he was appointed a member of the Royal Netherlands Academy of Arts and Sciences. For many years he was a church councilor of Haarlem's Mennonite Congregation. When he retired from his professorship and directorship in 1958, the staff of the Laboratorium voor Bloembollenonderzoek had grown to sixty people, one of whom was his son, ir. D.H.M. van Slogteren.

In 1966 Egbert van Slogteren was awarded the M.W. Beijerinck Virology Prize.

== Selected publications ==
- "Influence of climate and shipping conditions on the early forcing of daffodils by Egbertus van Slogteren". Daffodil and tulip yearbook 1935. The Royal Horticultural Society, UK. 1935. pp. 48–55.
- "The influence of climate and storing-conditions on the flowering of flower-bulbs by Egbertus van Slogteren". Proceedings of the VIIth International Congress of Refrigeration. 1936. pp. 22–42.
- van Slogteren, Egbertus (1937). The influence of different temperatures on development growth and flowering of hyacinths, tulips and daffodils. No. 55. Laboratorium door Bloembollenonderzoek.
- van Slogteren, Egbertus (1938). The early-forcing of daffodils. No. 59. Laboratorium door Bloembollenonderzoek.
- Van Slogteren, E.; Van Slogteren, D. H. M. (1957). "Serological Identification of Plant Viruses and Serological Diagnosis of Virus Diseases of Plants". Annual Review of Microbiology. 11: 149–164. doi:10.1146/annurev.mi.11.100157.001053. PMID 13470816.
