= Lex van der Eb =

Dutch molecular biologist and virologist

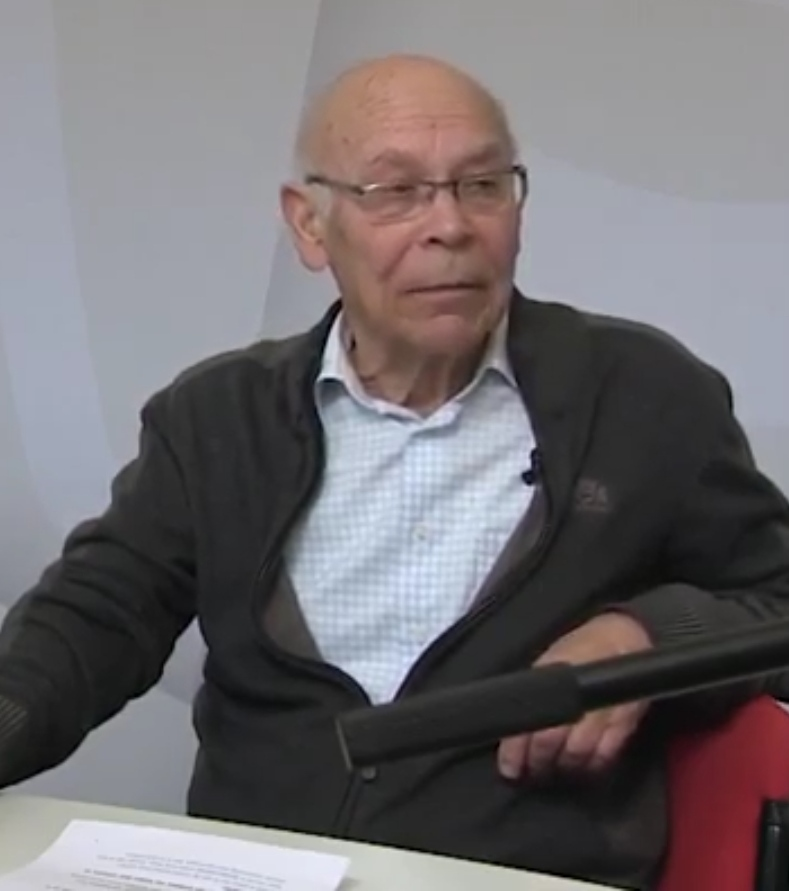
- Born: Alex Jan van der Eb; 16 January 1934 (age 92); Bandung, Dutch East Indies
- Occupations: Molecular biologist, virologist

Academic background
- Education: Leiden University
- Thesis: Fysisch-chemische en biologische eigenschappen van het DNA van dierlijke tumorvirussen (1968)
- Doctoral advisor: J.A. Cohen

Academic work
- Institutions: Leiden University
- Main interests: tumor virology, molecular carcinogenesis
- Notable ideas: calcium phosphate transfection, HEK 293 and PER.C6 cell lines

Alex Jan "Lex" van der Eb (born 16 January 1934) is a Dutch molecular biologist and virologist. He was a professor of fundamental tumor virology and later molecular carcinogenesis at Leiden University from 1979 to 2000. He has performed research in adenoviruses and was fundamental in the creation of the technique of calcium phosphate transfection and the founding of the HEK 293 and PER.C6 cell lines.

== Life ==
Van der Eb was born on 16 January 1934 in Bandung, Dutch East Indies. He studied biology at Leiden University and afterwards attended Delft University of Technology for a further year to specialize in microbiology. Van der Eb had to fulfill his military service upon graduation and asked the head of military health services to be employed in one of the military laboratories. In 1962 he was sent to work as a biologist on poxviruses in the virology department of Leiden University. At Leiden he met professor J.A. Cohen of the Medical-Biological Laboratory of the Netherlands Organisation for Applied Scientific Research (TNO). After his military service ended in 1963 van der Eb became a grad-student under Cohen. He studied adenoviruses and characterized the virus DNA in 1966. He obtained his PhD at Leiden University in 1968 with a thesis titled: "Fysisch-chemische en biologische eigenschappen van het DNA van dierlijke tumorvirussen". Van der Eb subsequently moved to the United States to become a post-grad at the California Institute of Technology, where he broadened his knowledge of DNA.

Upon request of Cohen van der Eb returned to the Netherlands in 1970 to start a research group in molecular biology of oncoviruses. During this period Canadian post-doc Frank L. Graham joined his research group. Together they worked on a technique to insert foreign DNA in cultured human cells. The technique of calcium phosphate transfection became available in 1973. Fellow molecular biologist Piet Borst called this discovery of how to insert foreign DNA in human cells the cornerstone of genetics and cell biology. In 1972 van der Eb obtained and managed to culture embryonic kidney cells from an aborted or miscarried human foetus. With Graham's contributions in transfection of the cells with the adenovirus 5 this led to the cell line of HEK 293 cells. HEK 293 became one of the most used cell lines worldwide, coming close to the use of the HeLa cell line. In 1974 van der Eb and Graham demonstrated that loose virus DNA could cause cancer.

In 1974 van der Eb became a lector of fundamental tumor virology. In 1979 he was named professor of fundamental tumor virology. From 1987 to 1992 he performed research on the chicken anemia virus together with Mathieu Noteborn. In 1988 his teaching assignment was changed to molecular carcinogenesis. In 1995, together with Dinko Valerio, he created the PER.C6 cell line with enhanced traceability compared to the HEK 293 line, this time coming from retinal cells. The goal of Valerio was to use it for gene therapy but this was ultimately unsuccessful. In contrast to HEK 293 the PER.C6 cell line was patented by Leiden University and IntroGene (later Crucell) and used commercially. AdVac later became an enhanced version of PER.C6 and both were deemed to be very useful to construct vaccines with, becoming the basis of vaccines for ebola, Zika fever and HIV. Van der Eb retired in 2000. He later worked as an advisor for biotechnology company Crucell between 2000 and 2013. In 2007 he was involved in writing the behavioural code for biosecurity of the Royal Netherlands Academy of Arts and Sciences.

In 2020 van der Eb together with two other former Crucell officials stated that the Netherlands would have had a better starting position in obtaining vaccines to deal with the COVID-19 pandemic in the Netherlands if the government had been interested in letting Crucell work together with the Netherlands Vaccine Institute, with Crucell offering the Netherlands rapid vaccine production in the case of a pandemic multiple times during the early 2000s. Crucell was later bought by the American corporation Johnson & Johnson.

== Honours and awards ==
Van der Eb was elected a member of the European Molecular Biology Organization in 1977. In 1978 he won the M.W. Beijerinck Virology Medal of the Royal Netherlands Academy of Arts and Sciences. He was elected member of the Royal Netherlands Academy of Arts and Sciences in 1987. He was elected a member of Academia Europaea in 1989. In 1989 he was also winner of the Robert Koch Prize. In the same year he won the Japan Foundation for Promotion of Cancer Research Award. He was made a Knight of the Order of the Netherlands Lion in 1998. In 2003 he was appointed an honorary member of the Netherlands Society of Gene and Cell Therapy. He is a member of the Koninklijke Hollandsche Maatschappij der Wetenschappen.
