= Lewis W. Wannamaker =

American biochemist

Lewis William Wannamaker (19 May 1923, in St. Matthews, South Carolina – 24 March 1983) was an American biochemist who won the Robert Koch Prize with César Milstein in 1980. He received his bachelor's degree from Emory University and his M.D. from the Duke University School of Medicine and taught at the University of Minnesota. In 1982 he was elected a member of the Institute of Medicine of the National Academy of Sciences. He died in 1983 at the age of 59.
