= Edward John Wherry III =

American immunologist

E. John Wherry III

Academic background
- Education: Penn State University; Thomas Jefferson University; Emory University
- Doctoral advisor: Laurence Eisenlohr

Academic work
- Discipline: Immunology
- Institutions: University of Pennsylvania; Wistar Institute
- Website: https://www.med.upenn.edu/wherrylab/

Edward John Wherry III (known professionally as John Wherry) is an American immunologist. He is the Richard and Barbara Schiffrin President's Distinguished Professor and department chair of Systems Pharmacology and Translational Therapeutics at the University of Pennsylvania. He is also the director of the Penn Institute for Immunology and Immune Health.

== Education ==
Wherry received his B.S. degree in science from The Pennsylvania State University in 1993 and his Ph.D. in immunology from Thomas Jefferson University in 2000. He completed his thesis on the effect of epitope density on CD8+ cell priming under the mentorship of Laurence "Ike" Eisenlohr.

== Academic posts ==
Wherry continued on to a postdoctoral fellowship with Rafi Ahmed at Emory University from 2000 to 2004. After completing his postdoc, he joined The Wistar Institute as an assistant professor where he remained until 2010. He then joined the department of Microbiology at the University of Pennsylvania's Perelman School of Medicine. He served as the chair of the Immunology Graduate Group (IGG) from 2011 to 2013 and remains on the IGG Executive Committee. In 2012 he was appointed as director of the Institute for Immunology (IFI). Wherry was named the inaugural Richard and Barbara Schiffrin President's Distinguished Professor in 2017. A year later, Wherry was appointed as chair of the Systems Pharmacology and Translational Therapeutics department. Dr. Wherry co-leads the Parker Institute for Cancer Immunotherapy at Penn and is the Director of the Colton Center for Autoimmunity at Penn as well as the Colton Consortium that also includes centers at New York University, Yale University, and Tel Aviv University. Wherry served on the Scientific Advisory Board of Break Through Cancer from 2021 to 2024.

== Research ==
Wherry's research has focused on the field of T cell exhaustion, elucidating mechanisms that attenuate T cell responses during chronic infections and cancer. He helped identify the role of the immunological checkpoints molecule PD-1 and others for reinvigoration of exhausted T cells in cancer. Dr. Wherry’s work has defined the underlying molecular and epigenetic mechanisms of exhausted T cells and studies from his group have delineated the developmental biology and lineage relationships of exhausted T cells. His laboratory has also focused on applying systems immunology approaches to define Immune Health patients across a spectrum of diseases, including an emphasis on the pharmacodynamic responses of immune cells and immune pathways following therapeutic interventions.

== Awards and honors ==
- 2024: Member, National Academy of Medicine
- 2018: Stand Up To Cancer Phillip A. Sharp Award
- 2016: Cancer Research Institute's Frederick W. Alt Award for New Discoveries in Immunology
- 2014 & 2016: Highly Cited Research and Rising Star by Thomson/Reuters ISI
- 2014: "World's Most Influential Scientific Minds" Award by Thomson Reuters
- 2014: Wherry received the distinguished Alumni Award from the Thomas Jefferson University Graduate School of Biomedical Sciences
- 2007: "America's Young Innovators-37 under 36" by the Smithsonian Magazine
- 2006: New Scholar in Aging award from the Ellison Medical Foundation
