= Rafi Ahmed =

Indian virologist and immunologist

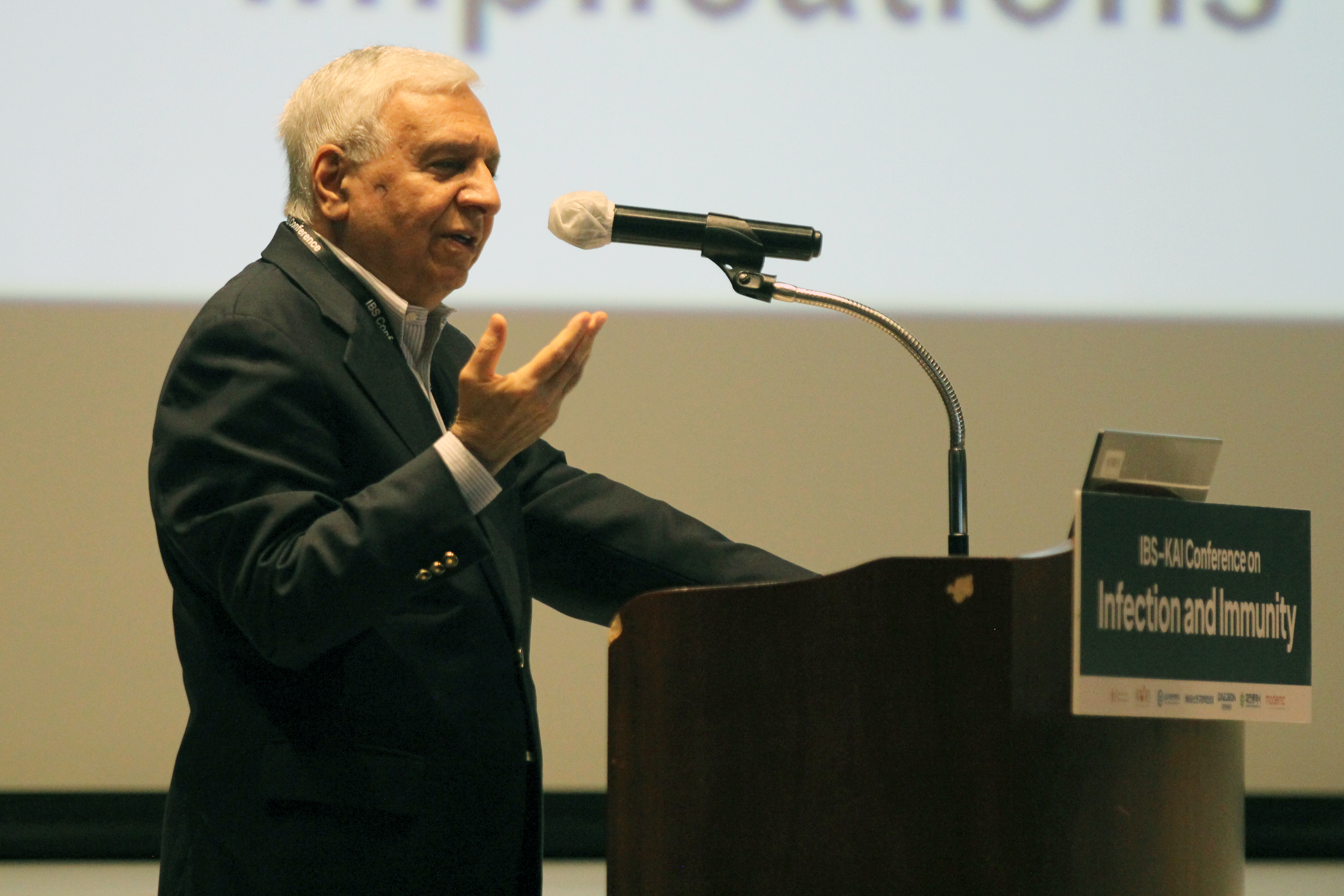
- Born: 1948 (age 77–78); Hyderabad, India
- Education: Harvard University
- Children: Hasan Ahmed, Fatima Ahmed
- Awards: Member of the National Academy of Sciences since 2009, received American Association of Immunologists' Excellence in Mentoring Award in 2015; William B. Coley Award (2017)
- Scientific career
- Fields: Microbiology, immunology
- Patrons: Pallotta TeamWorks
- Thesis: Genetic Studies Of Persistent Reovirus Infection In L Cells (1981)
- Notable students: Shane Crotty (postdoc) Edward John Wherry III (postdoc)

Rafi Ahmed (born 1948 in Hyderabad, India) is an Indian-American virologist and immunologist. He is the Charles Howard Candler Professor of Microbiology and Immunology at Emory University, where he is also the director of the Emory Vaccine Center and a Georgia Research Alliance Eminent Scholar in Vaccine Research. In 2009, he was elected to the National Academy of Sciences.

== Early life and education ==
Ahmed was born and raised in Hyderabad, India, where his father served as a public servant and his mother as an active volunteer. While living in Hyderabad, Ahmed received his BSc in chemistry from Osmania University in 1968. With strong English skills from his school in India, Ahmed moved in 1970 to Pocatello, Idaho to attend Idaho State University, where he received another B.S. in 1972 and an M.S. in 1974, both of which were in microbiology. He then attended McGill University, originally with the goal of receiving a doctorate in microbiology, but, after questioning his motivation for the field, he dropped out of McGill and later worked as a research assistant there for two years. In 1981, he received his Ph.D. in microbiology from Harvard University after studying for four years in Bernard Fields's lab. Later that year, he left Harvard for the Scripps Institute to begin his postdoc.

== Career ==
After completing his postdoc in 1984, Ahmed joined the University of California, Los Angeles (UCLA) as an assistant professor. In 1992, he became a full professor there. In 1995, he left UCLA and joined the faculty at Emory as a Georgia Research Alliance Eminent Scholar in Vaccine Research and the director of the Emory Vaccine Center, positions he has held ever since. After serving as a professor of microbiology and immunology at Emory for 15 years, Ahmed was named to the Charles Howard Candler Professorship of microbiology and immunology there in 2010.

== Research ==
Ahmed is known for his research on T cells, which he began studying during his postdoc. Specifically, at UCLA, Ahmed studied memory T cell differentiation and immunity of T and B cells against viruses, such as hepatitis C and HIV in a paper that gained him notoriety in the immunology world. In 1995, Ahmed moved to Emory University and began his work to secure funding to develop a vaccine center there. At Emory, Ahmed has worked to investigate T cell exhaustion in fighting chronic infection, through which he discovered a link between T cell exhaustion and expression of the gene PD1, or "Programmed Death 1." With the help of Emory graduate student Daniel Barber, Ahmed devised a way to use antibodies to block this inhibitory receptor and enhance flagging T cell function. Today, "PD1 Blockade Treatments" are being investigated for treating aggressive cancers with promising preliminary results. At the Ahmed Laboratory at Emory University, Rafi Ahmed and his team work to build understanding on the development and maintenance of humoral memory. The lab has co-developed a novel method for rapidly generating human monoclonal antibodies after vaccination, and has shown that "broadly cross-reactive antibodies that recognize multiple influenza viruses can be generated after influenza vaccination in humans."
