= Andreas J. Bäumler =

German-American microbiologist

- Education: University of Tübingen
- Known for: Salmonella
- Spouse: Renee Tsolis
- Scientific career
- Fields: Microbiology, Immunology

Andreas J. Bäumler is a professor in the Department of Medical Microbiology and Immunology at the University of California, Davis School of Medicine, in Davis, California. Dr. Bäumler studies the molecular mechanisms of Salmonella interaction with the intestinal mucosa. He is one of the leading researchers in the field of Salmonella research and has several highly cited publications on the topic of Salmonella infection, immunity to Salmonella, and the interactions between the host, the pathogen, and the intestinal microbiota during infection. Dr. Bäumler has a B.S. and a Ph.D. in Microbiology from University of Tübingen, Germany. Since 2010 Dr. Bäumler is a fellow of the American Academy of Microbiology and since 2020 of the Leopoldina. He is Editor in Chief of the scientific journal "Infection and Immunity." In 2021 he was awarded the Robert Koch Award for his pioneering work in understanding the regulation of the composition and function of our microflora by the cells of the intestinal epithelium. He became member of the National Academy of Sciences in 2023. Dr. Bäumler is a highly cited researcher in the field of Microbiology.

== Research ==
Dr. Bäumler's laboratory performed pioneering work on understanding the regulation of the composition and function of our microflora by the cells of the intestinal epithelium. They were able to show that cellular respiration of the intestinal cells and their energy metabolism play an essential role in this. If, for example, the intestinal cells change their metabolism during inflammation, the composition of the microflora changes, resulting in so-called dysbiosis, which can have a decisive influence on the course of the disease, for example in the case of intestinal inflammation, but also in the case of cancer or cardiovascular disease. Dr. Bäumler's research provides completely new and original starting points for restoring the balance between microflora and the human body in these diseases.
