= Raul Andino =

- Born: 1957 (age 68–69)
- Awards: Beijerinck Virology Prize (2017)

Academic background
- Academic advisor: David Baltimore

Academic work
- Doctoral students: Shane Crotty (2001)

Raul Andino is a virologist and professor in the Department of Microbiology and Immunology at the University of California, San Francisco. He is noted for leading a team of researchers that developed the first new oral polio vaccine in 50 years.

== Early life and education ==
Raul Andino was born in 1957 in Argentina. He completed his master's degree in Biology in 1980 and his Ph.D. in Chemistry in 1986, both at the University of Buenos Aires.

Andino emigrated to the United States in the 1980s. He then went on to work as a postdoctoral researcher first at the Whitehead Institute for Biomedical Research from 1986 to 1991, then at Rockefeller University in the lab of David Baltimore from 1991 to 1992. He then joined the faculty of the University of California, San Francisco as an assistant professor. He was promoted to associate professor in 1999, then full professor in 2003.

== Research ==
Raul Andino's research has long focused on poliovirus. Together with Andrew Macadam, Andino redesigned the polio vaccine to enhance its genetic stability and reduce the risk of the virus reverting to a virulent form.

Andino was a key member of the team that developed novel oral polio vaccines (nOPVs) for poliovirus types 1 and 3, building upon their earlier work on nOPV2. These vaccines have been engineered to be more genetically stable and less likely to regain virulence than the original Sabin strains.

His research has expanded to other enteroviruses and host defenses against various RNA viruses. His group has also had a long-standing interest in RNA interference as an antiviral defense, and in the dynamics of viral evolution during infection and transmission.

Andino has warned of a “silent epidemic” of circulating vaccine-derived poliovirus (cVDPV) in developed countries where only the inactivated polio vaccine (IPV) is used. Because IPV prevents symptomatic disease but does not provide gut immunity, cVDPV can circulate undetected through wastewater.

Andino's recent work has focused on developing a new, more stable version of the oral polio vaccine. By targeting a specific area on the viral genome responsible for reversion to virulence, Andino and his colleagues engineered a strain that requires multiple mutations before reverting to a virulent phenotype. Andino described this approach as "putting the virus in an evolutionary cage."

== Notable publications ==
- Vignuzzi M, Stone JK... Andino R (2006). Quasispecies diversity determines pathogenesis through cooperative interactions in a viral population. Nature. 439(7074): pgs. 344-348
- Gitlin L, Karelsky S, Andino R (2002). Short interfering RNA confers intracellular antiviral immunity in human cells. Nature. 418(6896): pgs. 430-434
- Crotty S, Camerson SE, Andino R (2001). RNA virus error catastrophe: direct molecular test using ribavirin. Proceedings of the National Academy of Sciences of the United States of America. 98(12): pgs. 6895-6900
- Gamarnik AV, Andino R (1998). Switch from translation to RNA replication in a positive-stranded RNA virus. Genes and Development. 12(15) pgs. 2293-2304
- Andino R, Rieckhof GE... Baltimore D (1993). Poliovirus RNA synthesis utilizes an RNP complex formed around the 5'-end of the viral RNA. EMBO Journal. 12(9): pgs. 3587-3598
