= Braun's lipoprotein =

Lipoprotein leucine-zipper

Identifiers
- Symbol: LPP
- Pfam: PF04728
- InterPro: IPR006817
- CATH: 1jccA00
- SCOP2: d1jcca_ / SCOPe / SUPFAM
Available protein structures:
- PDB: IPR006817 PF04728 (ECOD; PDBsum)
- AlphaFold: IPR006817; PF04728
- Use IPR016367 for full protein. E. coli protein is P69776.

Braun's lipoprotein (BLP, Lpp, murein lipoprotein, or major outer membrane lipoprotein) was first identified by V. Braun and K. Rehn in 1969, it was the first lipoprotein identified prompting much further study in this area. It is found in some gram-negative cell walls, is one of the most abundant membrane proteins; its molecular weight is about 7.2 kDa. It is bound at its C-terminal end (a lysine) by a covalent bond to the peptidoglycan layer (specifically to diaminopimelic acid molecules) and is embedded in the outer membrane by its hydrophobic head (a cysteine with lipids attached). BLP tightly links the two layers and provides structural integrity to the outer membrane.

== Characteristics ==
The gene encoding Braun's lipoprotein initially produces a protein composed of 78 amino acids, which includes a 20 amino acid signal peptide at the amino terminus. The mature protein is 6 kDa in size. Three monomers of Lpp assemble into a leucine zipper coiled-coil trimer.

Large amounts of Braun's lipoprotein is present, more than any other protein in E. coli. Unlike other lipoproteins, it is linked covalently to the peptidoglycan. Lpp connects the outer membrane to the peptidoglycan. Lpp is anchored to the outer membrane by its amino-terminal lipid group. In E. coli, one-third of Lpp proteins form a peptide bond via the side chain of its carboxy-terminal lysine with diaminopimelic acid in the peptidoglycan layer. The rest of the Lpp molecules are present in a "free" form unlinked to peptidoglycan. The free form is exposed on the surface of E. coli.

== Functions ==
Lpp, along with another OmpA-like lipoprotein called Pal/OprL (P0A912), maintains the stability of the cell envelope by attaching the outer membrane to the cell wall.

Lpp has been proposed as a virulence factor of Yersinia pestis, the cause of plague. Y. pestis needs lpp for maximum survival in macrophages and to efficiently kill mouse models of bubonic and pneumonic plague.

== Immunology ==
Braun's lipoprotein binds to the pattern recognition receptor TLR2. Lpp induces adhesion of neutrophils to human endothelial cells by activating the latter.
