= Paul M. Allen =

American cellular immunologist (born 1951)

- Born: Paul Malone Allen; September 1951 (age 74)
- Citizenship: American
- Education: University of Michigan
- Scientific career
- Fields: cellular immunologist
- Workplaces: Washington University in St. Louis
- Thesis: Functional and serological examination of the central portion of the I region of the H-2 gene complex
- Doctoral advisor: John Niederhuber

Paul Malone Allen (born September 1951) is an American cellular immunologist and current Robert L. Kroc Professor of Pathology and Immunology at Washington University School of Medicine in St. Louis. Allen holds prestigious MERIT status with the National Institutes of Health.

== Education and career ==
Paul Allen received his bachelor's degree in 1974 from the University of Michigan followed by a master's degree in 1977 and a doctoral degree in 1981 with John Niederhuber and a thesis titled "Functional and serological examination of the central portion of the I region of the H-2 gene complex", both from the University of Michigan. He completed a pathology research fellowship at Harvard Medical School with Emil Unanue and joined the Washington University faculty in 1985.

From 2005 to 2006, Allen served as the president of the American Association of Immunologists. He is a member of the editorial board for Immunity.

== Research ==
Allen's work specializes in the study of how T lymphocytes recognize antigens and initiate an immune response. He and Emil R. Unanue were responsible for the discovery that antigen-presenting cells present antigens to bind to a special group of molecules known as the major histocompatibility complex.

== Notable works ==
- Wipke BT, Allen PM (2001). Essential role of neutrophils in the initiation and progression of a murine model of rheumatoid arthritis. Journal of Immunology. 167(3): pp. 1601–1608
- Kersh EN, Shaw AS, Allen PM (1998). Fidelity of T cell activation through multistep T cell receptor ζ phosphorylation. Science. 281(5376): pp. 572–575
- Kersh GJ, Allen PM (1996). Essential flexibility in the T-cell recognition of antigen. Nature. 380(6574): pp. 495–498
- Sloan-Lancaster J, Shaw AS... Allen PM (1994). Partial T cell signalling: Altered phospho-ζ and lack of zap70 recruitment in APL-induced T cell anergy. Cell. 79(5): pp. 913–922
- Sloan-Lancaster J, Evavold BD, Allen PM (1993). Induction of T-cell anergy by altered T-cell-receptor ligand on live antigen-presenting cells. Nature. 363(6425): pp. 156–159
- Evavold BD, Allen PM (1991). Separation of IL-4 production from Th cell proliferation by an altered T cell receptor ligand. Science. 252(5010): pp. 1308–1310
- Unanue ER, Allen PM (1987). The basis for the immunoregulatory role of macrophages and other accessory cells. Science. 236(4801): pp. 551–557
