= Immunoproteomics =

Study of large set of protein

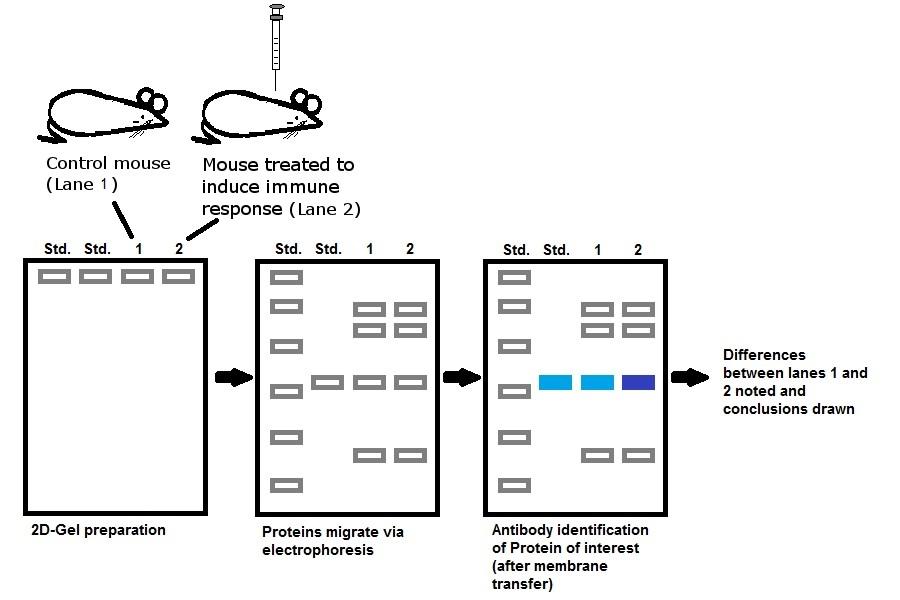
Immunoproteomics example experiment involving western blot analysis

Immunoproteomics is the study of large sets of proteins (proteomics) involved in the immune response.

Examples of common applications of immunoproteomics include:

- The isolation and mass spectrometric identification of MHC (major histocompatibility complex) binding peptides
- Purification and identification of protein antigens binding specific antibodies (or other affinity reagents)
- Comparative immunoproteomics to identify proteins and pathways modulated by a specific infectious organism, disease or toxin.

The identification of proteins in immunoproteomics is carried out by techniques including gel based, microarray based, and DNA based techniques, with mass spectroscopy typically being the ultimate identification method.

== Applications ==
=== Immunology ===
Immunoproteomics is and has been used to increase scientific understanding of both autoimmune disease pathology and progression. Using biochemical techniques, gene and ultimately protein expression can be measured with high fidelity. With this information, the biochemical pathways causing pathology in conditions such as multiple sclerosis and Crohn's disease can potentially be elucidated. Serum antibody identification in particular has proven to be very useful as a diagnostic tool for a number of diseases in modern medicine, in large part due to the relatively high stability of serum antibodies.

Immunoproteomic techniques are additionally used for the isolation of antibodies. By identifying and proceeding to sequence antibodies, scientists are able to identify potential protein targets of said antibodies. In doing so, it is possible to determine the antigen(s) responsible for a particular immune response. Identification and engineering of antibodies involved in autoimmune disease pathology may offer novel techniques in disease therapy.

=== Drug engineering ===
By identifying the antigens responsible for a particular immune response, it is possible to identify viable targets for novel drugs. In addition, specific antigens can further be classified based on immunoreactivity for identification of future potential vaccine preparations. In addition to the identification of vaccine candidates, immunoproteomic techniques such as western blotting can additionally be used for measuring the efficacy of a given vaccine.

== Technology and instrumentation ==
=== Mass spectrometry ===
Mass spectrometry can be used in the sequencing of MHC binding motifs, which can subsequently be used to predict T cell epitopes. The technique of peptide mass fingerprinting (PMF) can be used to check a peptide's mass spectrum against a database of protein digests which have already been documented. If the mass spectrum of the protein of interest as well as the database protein share a large amount of homology, it is likely that the protein of interest is contained within the sample.

=== Affinity proteomics ===
Affinity proteomics is a high-throughput method of studying the proteome with antibody or other affinity reagents (e.g. aptamers). Large numbers (dozens to hundreds) of immune-related cytokines and related markers can be simultaneously assayed in solution, in contrast to a solid substrate such as a microarray.

=== 2-D gel electrophoresis and western blotting ===
Two-dimensional gel electrophoresis (2-D gel) techniques in culmination with western blotting has been used for many years in the identification of immune response magnitude. This can be accomplished by comparing various samples against molecular-weight size markers for qualitative analysis and against known amounts of protein standards for quantitative analysis.

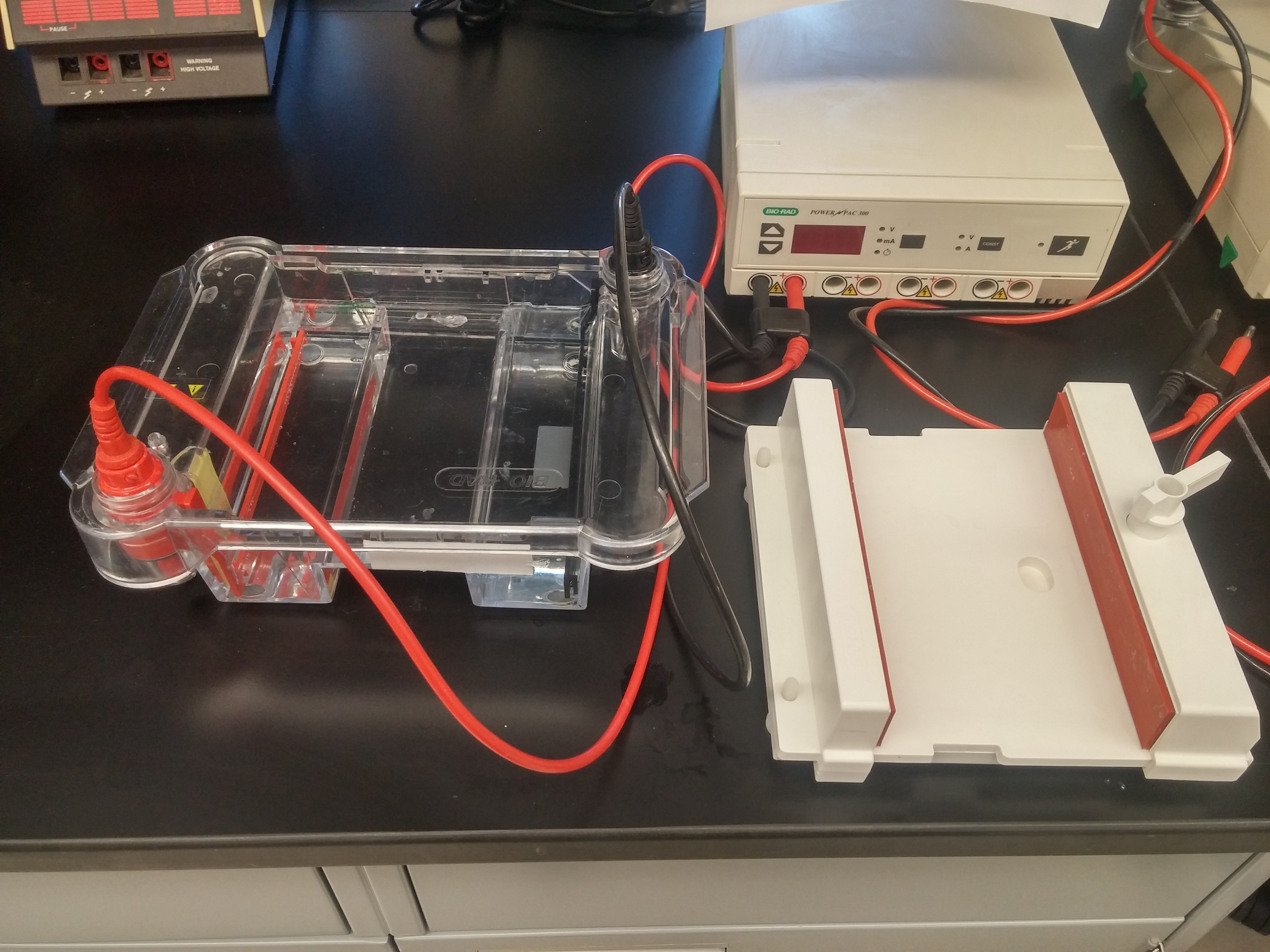
Common 2D-gel electrophoresis apparatus

=== 2-D liquid chromatography ===
By coupling liquid chromatography with a variety of other immunodetection techniques such as serological proteome analysis (SERPA), it is possible to analyze the hydrophobicity, PI, relative mass, and antibody reactivity of antibodies within a given serum.

=== Microarray ===
Microarray analysis of various serums can be used as a means to identify changes in gene expression before, after, and during a given immune response.

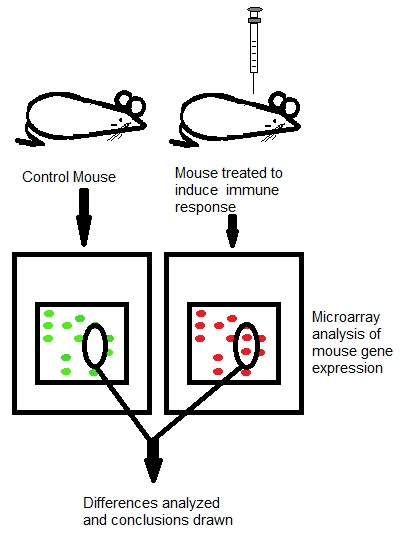
Immunoproteomic mice example

== See also ==
- Immunomics
