= Renee Diehl =

American physicist

Renee D. Diehl is an American physicist known for her work on the adsorption and physisorption of atoms and molecules onto crystal and quasicrystal surfaces, including the first experimental studies showing that non-reactive atoms on metal surfaces did not necessarily rest in crevices on the surface. She is a professor emerita of physics at the Pennsylvania State University.

== Education and career ==
Diehl was educated at the Shippensburg High School in Pennsylvania, and majored in physics at Juniata College, also in Pennsylvania. She graduated in 1976, and continued her studies at the University of Washington, where she completed a Ph.D. in 1982, supervised by Samuel C. Fain.

After postdoctoral studies at the University of Liverpool in the UK, she continued as a lecturer in Liverpool from 1983 to 1990. She returned to Pennsylvania and joined the Pennsylvania State University faculty in 1990, becoming a full professor there in 1998.

== Recognition ==
In 1999, the American Association of Physics Teachers gave Diehl their Distinguished Service Award, and she was named a Fellow of the American Physical Society "for structural studies of weakly-adsorbed species on surfaces".

Graduate Women in Science named her as an honorary member in 2001, she became a Fulbright Fellow in 2006, and Juniata College named her as a distinguished alumna in 2007.
