= Immunological Genome Project =

Content
- Organisms: immune cells in the mouse.

Contact
- Laboratory: various labs in US

Access
- Website: www.immgen.org

The Immunological Genome Project (ImmGen) is a collaborative scientific research project that is currently building a gene-expression database for all characterized immune cells in the mouse. The overarching goal of the project is to computationally reconstruct the gene regulatory network in immune cells. All data generated as part of ImmGen are made freely and publicly available at the ImmGen portal .

The ImmGen project began in 2008, as a collaboration between several immunology and computational biology laboratories across the United States, and will be completing its second phase in 2017. Currently, raw data and specialized data browsers from the first and second phases are on www.ImmGen.org.

== Project ==
=== Background ===
A true understanding of cell differentiation in the immune system will require a general perspective on the transcriptional profile of each cell type of the adaptive and innate immune systems, and how these profiles evolve through cell differentiation or activation by immunogenic or tolerogenic ligands. The ImmGen project aims to establish the roadmap of these transcriptional states.

=== Gene-expression compendium ===
The first aim of ImmGen is to generate a compendium of whole-genome transcriptional profiles (initially by microarray, now mostly by RNA-sequencing) for nearly all characterized cell populations of the adaptive and innate immune systems in the mouse, at major stages of differentiation and activation. This effort is being carried out by a group of collaborating immunology research laboratories across the U.S. Each of the laboratories brings a unique expertise in a particular cell lineage, and all are employing standardized procedures for cell sorting. The compendium of microarray data currently include over 250 immunologically relevant cell types, from all lymphoid organs and other tissues which are monitored by immune cells.

=== Publications ===
A series of ImmGen reports was published as the compendium accumulated. Some lineage specific reports described hematopoietic stem cells, natural killer cells, neutrophiles, B and T cells, natural killer cells, macrophage, dendritic cells, alpha beta T cells, gamma delta T cells, activated CD8 T cells, innate lymphoid cells, and lymph node stromal cells. Though most of the transcriptional profiling was done on B6 mice, the effect of genetic variation was also studied. The second phase of ImmGen started profiling activated immune cells. The interferon response was used as a test case.

=== Bioinformatic gene regulatory network model ===
Several groups of collaborating computational biologists (Regev & Koller) used the data to reverse-engineer the genetic regulatory network in immune cells, and compare it to the human immune system An initial survey of differential splicing across immune lineages was carried out using both microarrays and RNA-sequencing.

=== Visual representation of data ===
Project participants from Brown University's Computer Sciences Department are also exploring novel representation modes for the ImmGen data, developing and curating the public representation.

=== Members ===
Participating Immunology laboratories include:

The Brenner (NKT, BWH, Boston), Goldrath (Activated CD8 T cells, UCSD, San Diego), Kang (gamma delta T cells, U. Mass, Worcester), Lanier (NK, UCSF, San Francisco), Mathis/Benoist (alpha beta T cells, HMS, Boston), Merad and Randolph (monocytes & macrophages, Mount Sinai, New York and Washington University in St. Louis), Rossi (HSC, Children's, Boston), Turley (DC, DFCI, Boston), and Wagers (HSC, Joslin, Boston) labs.

Richard (Randy) Hardy (Fox Chase, Philadelphia), who was an ImmGen member since its initiation, died in June 2016.

=== Current status ===
As of August 2016, Immgen has profiled more than 250 naive cell populations in the mouse using microarrays, and several dozens of activated cell types using RNA-sequencing.

== Data access ==
The project's status and detailed information can be seen at (ImmGen). This site also includes a dedicated data browser, with which users can interactively explore the expression profiles for particular genes, networks of co-regulated genes, and genes that best distinguish different cell types. Raw data are available at the NCBI's Gene Expression Omnibus

== See also ==
- Immunomics
- Immunoproteomics
