= Borstel, Schleswig-Holstein =

Borstel
- Municipality
- Coat of arms

- Location of Borstel within Segeberg district
- Interactive map of Borstel
- Location within Germany Location within Schleswig-Holstein
- Coordinates: 53°58′N 9°46′E
- Country: Germany
- State: Schleswig-Holstein
- District: Segeberg
- Municipal assoc.: Bad Bramstedt-Land

Government
  - Mayor: Ulrich Badde

Area
  - Total: 5.12 km^{2} (1.98 sq mi)
- Elevation: 13 m (43 ft)

Population (2025-12-31)
  - Total: 130
  - Density: 25/km^{2} (66/sq mi)
- Time zone: UTC+01:00 (CET)
  - Summer (DST): UTC+02:00 (CEST)
- Postal codes: 24616
- Dialling codes: 04324
- Vehicle registration: SE
- Website: www.amt-bad- bramstedt-land.de

Borstel (German pronunciation: [ˈbɔʁstl̩]) is a municipality in the district of Segeberg, in Schleswig-Holstein, Germany.
