= Emil R. Unanue =

American immunologist (1934–2022)

Emil Raphael Unanue
- Born: September 13, 1934; Republic of Cuba
- Died: December 16, 2022 (aged 88)
- Citizenship: Cuba (birth), U.S.
- Education: University of Havana
- Known for: Research in immunology
- Scientific career
- Fields: Scientist; Immunologist; Educator; [Author]
- Workplaces: Harvard University; Scripps Research Institute; Washington University in St. Louis
- Doctoral students: Herbert W. "Skip" Virgin

Emil Raphael Unanue (September 13, 1934 – December 16, 2022) was a Cuban-American immunologist and Paul & Ellen Lacy Professor Emeritus at Washington University School of Medicine. He is a member of the National Academy of Sciences, the American Academy of Arts and Sciences and the Institute of Medicine. He previously served as chair of the National Academy of Sciences Section of Microbiology and Immunology.

== Area of expertise ==
Unanue initiated a field of study known as antigen presentation; it is critical to the development of vaccines and underlies an understanding of microbial immunity and autoimmune diseases.

In the late 1970s, it was recognized that T lymphocytes could not recognize antigen directly and instead required an interaction with another specialized cell known as the Antigen-presenting cell. Nobel Prize winners, Rolf Zinkernagel and Peter C. Doherty showed that this recognition also required the antigen-presenting cell to be from the same genetic background as the T-cell. That observation, called MHC restriction, led to a conundrum; namely, that the ability of a T cell to recognize foreign antigen also required that it recognize "self"

With Paul M. Allen, the Robert L. Kroc Professor at Washington University School of Medicine, Unanue discovered that peptides from foreign antigens were bound to a group of molecules known as the major histocompatibility complex (MHC). This peptide-MHC complex was shown to be recognized by T cells. Although the latter hypothesis was initially greeted with intense skepticism, a large body of work, generated over the last two decades, has confirmed its validity.

== Education and early career ==
Emil Unanue received his doctorate from the University of Havana (Cuba) in 1960. He then immigrated to the United States and studied briefly at the University of Pittsburgh. Following that experience, Unanue was a postdoctoral research fellow at the Scripps Clinic and Research Foundation, now The Scripps Research Institute in La Jolla, California. With his mentor, Dr. Frank J. Dixon, he made a series of contributions to the field of renal pathophysiology by examining the immune basis of glomerulonephritis. Unanue then joined the group headed by Dr. Brigitte Askonas at the National Institute for Medical Research at Mill Hill in London.

Together, Unanue & Askonas made the seminal observation that macrophages did not completely catabolize antigens, foreshadowing development of the field of antigen processing and presentation. In 1970, Unanue was given an appointment in the Department of Pathology at Harvard Medical School, where he quickly rose through the academic ranks to become the Mallinckrodt Professor of Immunopathology in 1974.

While at Harvard University, he and his colleagues made observations in the areas of immunoglobulin capping on B cells and host defenses to bacteria such as Listeria monocytogenes. That work culminated in the conclusion that MHC molecules mediate the display of processed peptides to T cells.

== Work at Washington University in St. Louis, Missouri ==
From 1985 to 2006, Unanue was the chairman of pathology and immunology and Mallinckrodt Professor at Washington University School of Medicine. He was preceded in that position by Dr. Paul Eston Lacy, and succeeded by Dr. Herbert "Skip" Virgin. Unanue's research focused on the molecular mechanisms of antigen processing, the immunological basis of autoimmune diabetes, and immune responses to intracellular bacteria.

== Illness and death ==
Unanue developed a malignant brain tumor, glioblastoma multiforme, in 2020. He died of the disease in 2022 in St. Louis, Missouri.

== Awards ==
- 1989 Cancer Research Institute William B. Coley Award
- 1995 Albert Lasker Award for Basic Medical Research
- 2000 Gairdner Foundation International Award
- 2005 Robert Koch Gold Medal
- 2014 American Association of Immunologists Lifetime Achievement Award
