= Ira Mellman =

American cell biologist

- Born: Ira Seth Mellman
- Education: Oberlin College; Yale University; Rockefeller University
- Known for: endosomes
- Awards: Member of the National Academy of Sciences; EMBO Member
- Scientific career
- Fields: Cell biology
- Workplaces: Parker Institute for Cancer Immunotherapy; Genentech; University of California, San Francisco
- Doctoral advisor: Leon E. Rosenberg
- Other academic advisors: Ralph Steinman
- Doctoral students: Shannon Turley

Ira Seth Mellman is an American cell biologist who discovered endosomes. He is currently the president of research at the Parker Institute for Cancer Immunotherapy (PICI). He served as Vice President of Cancer Immunology at Genentech in South San Francisco, California where he led the development of several cancer therapies including atezolizumab and mosunetuzumab.

== Early life and education ==
Mellman grew up in New York, where he lived until he enrolled at Oberlin College in Oberlin, Ohio. While in college he maintained an interest in music but focused on the rapidly expanding field of cell biology. Working with David Miller, he began to study Chlamydomonas and found that a significant amount of the cell wall consisted of extensin. After leaving Oberlin, he enrolled in the graduate program at the University of California, Berkeley, but later transferred to Yale University to switch to research more applicable to people. At Yale, he studied the genetics behind vitamin B12 metabolism under the guidance of geneticist Leon E. Rosenberg.

== Research and career ==
After his PhD, Mellman became interested in endocytosis and did postdoctoral research with Ralph Steinman and Zanvil A. Cohn at Rockefeller University where he started characterizing endosomes. Mellman's work has examined the role of endocytosis in cell metabolism and human disease. He was among the first to characterize the endosomal system. Later projects include investigation of LDL cholesterol receptor internalization, cellular sorting machinery, and the cellular basis for immunity. He is an authority on the cell biological mechanisms and function of dendritic cells, the cell type responsible for initiating the immune response, an interest that dates back to his postdoctoral period at Rockefeller University in the lab of Ralph Steinman, who won the Nobel Prize in 2011 for his discovery of dendritic cells.

=== Return to Yale and later years ===
Mellman returned to Yale after completing postdoctoral work and remained there as a professor for over twenty years. During this time he was the Sterling Professor of Cell Biology & Immunobiology, chair of the Cell Biology Department, Scientific Director of the Yale Cancer Center and a member of the Ludwig Institute for Cancer Research. Mellman has served on the council of the American Society for Cell Biology, is currently on the Board of Directors of the American Association for Cancer Research, and was the editor-in-chief of the Journal of Cell Biology from 1999 to 2008. He remains active as a senior editor for the journal. In 2000, he co-founded CGI Pharmaceuticals focused on the development of small molecule kinase inhibitors. The company would be acquired by Gilead Sciences in 2010.

=== Genentech ===
In 2007, Mellman was recruited to Genentech as the Director of Research Oncology to replace Marc Tessier-Lavigne. There, the company is developing understanding of immunology and along that, immunotherapy. In August 2024, Roche and Genentech announced the decision to shut down its cancer immunology research department leading to the departure Mellman who has been with the company for 17 years and led the unit. His former doctoral students include Shannon Turley.

In December 2018, Mellman spoke at the 'Antibody Engineering and Therapeutics" conference, which took place in San Diego, California.

=== Awards and honors ===
Mellman is a member of the National Academy of Sciences of the United States a Fellow of the American Academy of Arts and Sciences, and a Foreign Associate of the European Molecular Biology Organization (EMBO).

== Personal life ==
In 1976, he married Margaret Moench. The couple have three children. He is also plays bass in the rock band Cellmates.
