= Nonspecific immune cell =

Immune cells that responds to any antigen

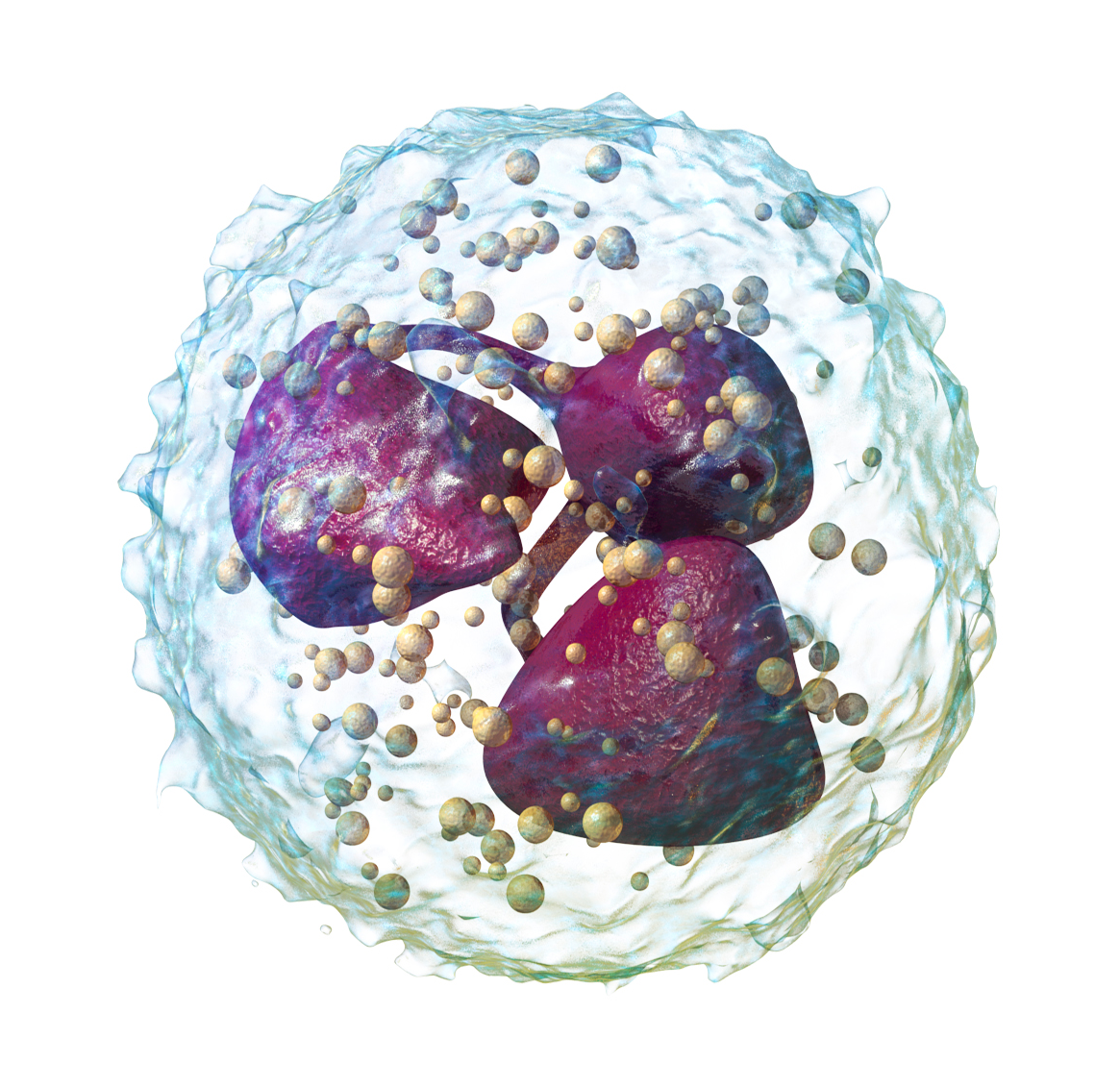
Neutrophils are an example of a non-specific immune cell

A non-specific immune cell is an immune cell (such as a macrophage, neutrophil, or dendritic cell) that responds to many antigens, not just one antigen. Non-specific immune cells function in the first line of defense against infection or injury. The innate immune system is always present at the site of infection and ready to fight the bacteria; it can also be referred to as the "natural" immune system. The cells of the innate immune system do not have specific responses and respond to each foreign invader using the same mechanism.

== The innate immune system ==
There are two categories to which parts of the immune system are assigned: the non-specific, or innate immune system and the adaptive immune system. The non-specific response is a generalized response to pathogen infections involving the use of several white blood cells and plasma proteins. Non-specific immunity, or innate immunity, is the immune system with which you were born, made up of phagocytes and barriers. Phagocytosis, derived from the Greek words phagein, meaning to eat, kytos or cell, and “osis” meaning process, was first described by Élie Metchnikoff, who won the Nobel Prize 100 years ago. Phagocytosis involves the internalization of solids, such as bacteria, by an organism.

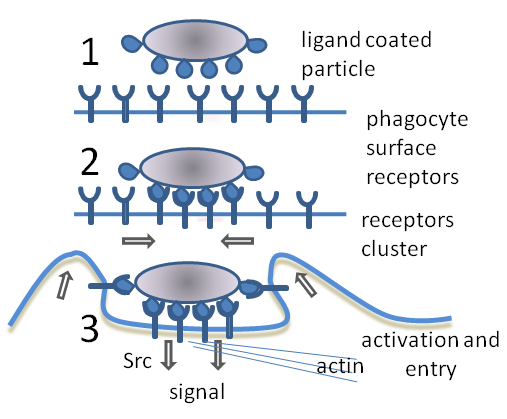
Phagocytosis in Three Steps

Macrophages, neutrophils, and dendritic cells are all cells of the innate immune system that utilize phagocytosis and are equipped with Toll-like receptors (TLR). Toll-like receptors are present on each of these cells and recognize a variety of microbial products resulting in the induction of more specific immune responses. When a phagocytic cell engulfs bacteria, a phagosome is formed around it and the entire complex is ultimately trafficked to the lysosome for degradation. These cells that participate in the non-specific immune system response do not differentiate between types of microorganisms but do have the ability to discern between what is self and what is non-self. The cells of this system are known as non-specific immune cells.

== Cells of the innate immune system ==
Neutrophils are a type of phagocyte, abundant in blood, that phagocytize pathogens in acute inflammation. Neutrophils, along with eosinophils and basophils, make up the category of granulocytes. Macrophages, also known as monocytes, will phagocytize a wide range of molecules. Dendritic cells are tree-like cells that bind antigens and alert the lymphocytes of infection, essentially directing T cells to make an immune response. Complement proteins are proteins that play a role in the non-specific immune responses alongside these non-specific immune cells to make up the first line of immune defense.

The non-specific immune response is an immediate antigen-independent response, however it is not antigen-specific. Non-specific immunity results in no immunologic memory. There are mechanical, chemical, and biological factors affecting the effectiveness and results of the non-specific immune response. These factors include the epithelial surfaces forming a physical barrier, fatty acids that inhibit the growth of bacteria, and the microflora of the gastrointestinal tract serving to prevent the colonization of pathogenic bacteria. The non-specific immune system involves cells to which antigens are not specific in regards to fighting infection. The non-specific immune cells mentioned above (macrophages, neutrophils, and dendritic cells) will be discussed regarding their immediate response to infection.

=== Macrophages ===
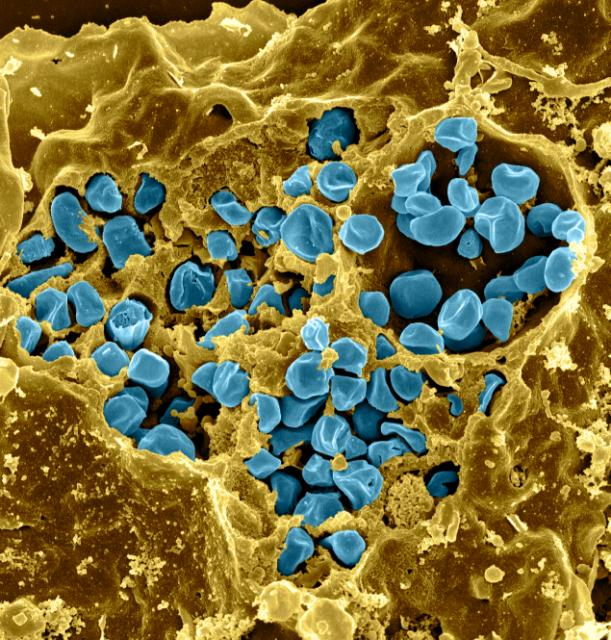
Macrophage infected with bacteria.

Macrophages display a plasticity that allows them to respond to numerous types of infections, permitting them to change their physiology, while serving as a common “janitorial cell” to the immune system. Macrophages are produced through the differentiation of monocytes, and after ingestion of bacteria, secrete enzymes to destroy the ingested particle. These cells reside in every tissue of the body, and upon infected tissue, are recruited to the tissue. Once recruited, macrophages will differentiate into specific tissue macrophages. The receptors of macrophages consist of a broad specificity that allows them to discern between self and non-self in the non-specific recognition of foreign substances. There are type I and type II receptors present on macrophages, which are trimeric membrane glycoproteins each containing an NH2-terminal intracellular domain, an extracellular domain with a spacer region and an alpha-helical domain. Contrary to the structure of type II, type I receptors have a cysteine-rich COOH-terminal domain. These characteristics of macrophage receptors confer the broad specificity, which allow them to function as a general non-specific immune cell.

=== Neutrophils ===
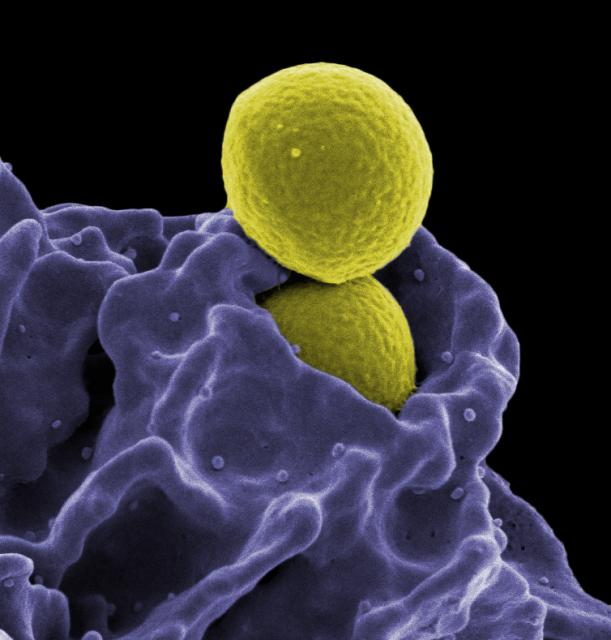
Neutrophil ingesting Methicillin-resistant Staphylococcus aureus (MRSA).

Neutrophils are some of the first immune cells to travel to sites of infection that aid in fighting infection by ingesting microorganisms and providing the enzymes to kill them. This process characterizes neutrophils as a type of phagocyte. Neutrophils contain neutrophil extracellular traps (NETs), composed of granule and nuclear constituents, which play a role in breaking up and killing bacteria that has invaded the immune system. NETs, composed of activated neutrophils, are fragile structures consisting of smooth stretches and globular domains, as shown via high-resolution scanning electron microscopy.

After stimulation of the neutrophil response, neutrophils lose their shape, allowing euchromatin and heterochromatin to homogenize, later resulting in the mixing of NET components. The formation of NETs happens once the nuclear envelope and granule membrane of the neutrophils disintegrates. The NETs are released as the cell membrane breaks, resulting in a unique process of cell death. These NET structures of neutrophils bind Gram-positive and Gram-negative bacteria, as well as fungi, which confers broad specificity of neutrophils, explaining their role in the first line of defense once microbes have invaded.

=== Dendritic cells ===
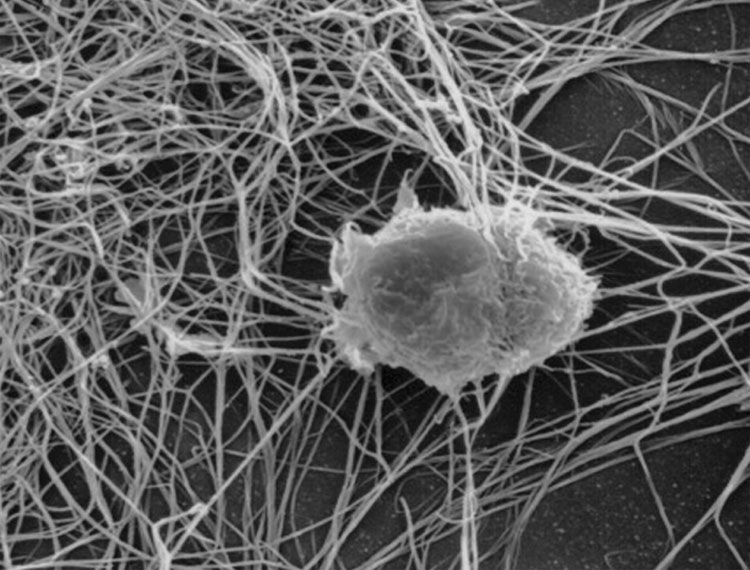
Dendritic cell.

The classification of dendritic cells as another type of white blood cell occurred over thirty-five years ago by Ralph Steinmann and Zanvil A. Cohn and has provided an essential link in the innate immune system. Dendritic cells line airways and intestines, participate in a rich network making up part of the epidermal layer of the skin, and play a unique role in initiating a primary immune response. Dendritic cells are named after their structure that resembles that of a dendrite of an axon, and they have two vital functions: display antigens, which are recognized by T cells and alert lymphocytes of the presence of an injury or infection. When the body is introduced to infection or injury, dendritic cells migrate to immune or lymphoid tissues. These two types of tissues are rich in T cells, the cells whose actions are induced by dendritic cells. Dendritic cells will capture antigens and engulf them through the process of phagocytosis. Dendritic cells contain Toll-like receptors (TLR) that will recognize a broad variety of microorganisms in the case of invasion. The activation of these receptors stimulates specific antigen responses and development of antigen-specific adaptive immunity. A unique feature of dendritic cells is that they are able to open up the tight junctions between epithelial cells and sample invaders themselves, all while maintaining the integrity of the epithelial barrier with expression of their own tight-junction proteins. A real life example of dendritic cell functions is displayed in the rejection of organ transplants.
