= Heinrich Emanuel Merck Prize =

German award

The Heinrich-Emanuel-Merck Prize is a prize of €30,000 awarded by the Merck Group in the name of Heinrich Emanuel Merck. From 1988 to 2022 the award recognised excellence in analytical chemistry; since 2025 it has instead focused on developments in the computational sciences and advanced computing.

== History ==
The prize was created in 1988 and carried a prize of €15,000. in honour of Heinrich Emanuel Merck, a nineteenth-century chemist and pharmacist who expanded Merck's scientific work through laboratory research and the controlled production of purified alkaloids.

From its establishment in 1988 until 2022, the Heinrich-Emanuel-Merck Prize was awarded in the field of analytical chemistry. It recognised scientists who developed new analytical methods in chemistry and related sciences.

After the final analytical sciences award in 2022, Merck changed the scope of the prize. From 2025 onward it was redefined as the Heinrich Emanuel Merck Award for Innovations in the Computational Sciences, with a focus on artificial intelligence, quantum computing, and neuro-inspired computing and continued to carry a prize of €15,000 which was increased in 2027 to €30,000.

== Recipients ==
=== Analytical sciences (1988–2022) ===
Between 1988 and 2022, the prize was awarded to scientists working in analytical chemistry.

- 1988 Masataka Hiraide (University of Nagoya/Japan) and Otto S. Wolfbeis (Universität Graz/Austria)
- 1990 Brian A. Bidlingmeyer (Millipore Corporation/USA) and Reinhard Nießner (Technical University of Munich/Germany)
- 1993 Aviv Amirav (Tel Aviv University/Israel)
- 1996 D. Jed Harrison (University of Alberta/Canada) and Andreas Manz (Imperial College London/UK)
- 1998 Renato Zenobi (ETH Zurich/Switzerland)
- 2000 Norman J. Dovich (University of Alberta/Canada)
- 2002 Jonathan V. Sweedler (University of Illinois/USA)
- 2004 Yoshinobu Baba (Tokushima University/Japan)
- 2007 Alexander A. Makarov (Thermo Electron/Germany) and Shuming Nie (Emory University and Georgia Institute of Technology/USA)
- 2010 Luisa Torsi (University of Bari/Italy)
- 2012 Aaron Wheeler (University of Toronto/Canada)
- 2015 Petra S. Dittrich (ETH Zurich/Switzerland)
- 2017 Francesco Ricci (University of Tor Vergata/Italy)
- 2019 David Alsteens (Université catholique de Louvain/Belgium)
- 2022 Valérie Gabelica (Institut National de la Santé et de la Recherche Médical/France)

=== Computational sciences (2025–) ===
Starting in 2025, it was awarded in the field of computational sciences and advanced computing.

- 2025 Alán Aspuru-Guzik (University of Toronto/Canada)
