= Karen E. Knudsen =

Karen E. Knudsen is the chief executive officer of the Parker Institute for Cancer Immunotherapy. She was the former chief executive officer of American Cancer Society and its advocacy affiliate the American Cancer Society Cancer Action Network. She is the first woman to hold that position in either organization.

Prior to joining ACS, Dr. Knudsen served as executive vice president of Oncology Services, Jefferson Health and enterprise director of its Sidney Kimmel Comprehensive Cancer Center, one of 71 NCI-designated cancer centers in the United States. Previously she was the Hilary Koprowski Endowed Professor of Oncology at Thomas Jefferson University in Philadelphia, Pennsylvania. She also held secondary appointments in the Departments of Urology, Medical Oncology, and Radiation Oncology.

== Education and career ==
Knudsen received her bachelor’s degree in biology from the George Washington University, her PhD in molecular biology from the University of California at San Diego in 1996, and her MBA with honors from the Fox School of Business and Management at Temple University. She completed her postdoctoral fellowship training at the Ludwig Institute for Cancer Research, San Diego under the mentorship of Dr. Webster K. Cavenee. She joined the faculty of the University of Cincinnati College of Medicine in 2000, wherein she became a tenured Associate Professor.

In 2007 she joined the Sidney Kimmel Cancer Center at Jefferson Health, and founded the cancer center’s prostate cancer program. After serving as the Deputy Director of the Sidney Kimmel Cancer Center and the Vice Provost of Thomas Jefferson University, Knudsen accepted the offer to serve as the Enterprise Director of the Sidney Kimmel Cancer Center in 2015, leading the cancer care and cancer discovery mission for Jefferson Health. She is also editor-in-chief, Molecular Cancer Research

Dr. Knudsen currently holds leadership roles with some of the most important cancer entities in the nation. She serves on the board of advisors for the National Cancer Institute and on 12 external advisory boards for NCI-designated cancer centers. She is an active member of several committees with the American Society for Clinical Oncology (ASCO), in addition to serving on other academic and for-profit advisory boards. She previously served as president of the Association of American Cancer Institutes (AACI), representing the 102 leading cancer centers in North America, and on the board of directors of the American Association for Cancer Research (AACR). Dr. Knudsen was also recognized as one of the 100 Influential Women in Oncology by OncoDaily.

== Research ==
Knudsen is an oncology researcher whose studies are focused on precision medicine in advanced prostate cancer, with an emphasis on understanding therapeutic relapse and designing new means of clinical intervention. Her translational studies have resulted in new clinical trials targeting DNA repair, cell cycle, and hormonal regulation pathways in patients with advanced disease. Knudsen and her colleagues discovered the mechanisms by which androgen signaling impacts cancer cell proliferation and DNA repair processes, and identified novel strategies for therapeutic intervention. Notable discoveries include identification of RB tumor suppressor loss as a major mechanism of therapeutic bypass, discovery of the androgen-DNA repair axis, and elucidation of androgen receptor function in the mitotic cell cycle. Her discoveries were amongst the first to propose utilization of PARP 1/2 inhibitors for advanced disease, now an FDA-approved agent for selected prostate cancers.

== Service ==
- President, Association of American Cancer Institutes (AACI)
- Board of directors, American Association for Cancer Research (AACR)
- Board of scientific advisors, National Cancer Institute (NCI)
- Scientific research board, Genentech
- Editor-in-chief, Molecular Cancer Research
- Associate editor, Oncogene
