= American Cancer Society =

Nonprofit organization

- Founded: May 22, 1913; 113 years ago
- Headquarters: Legally based in Atlanta, Georgia; national operations are distributed
- Origins: New York City, U.S.
- Region served: United States
- Method: Cancer research, public policy, education and service
- Fields: Cancer prevention
- Chief Executive Officer: Shane Jacobson
- Website: www.cancer.org

The American Cancer Society (ACS) is a nationwide non-profit organization dedicated to eliminating cancer. The ACS publishes the journals Cancer, CA: A Cancer Journal for Clinicians and Cancer Cytopathology.

== History ==
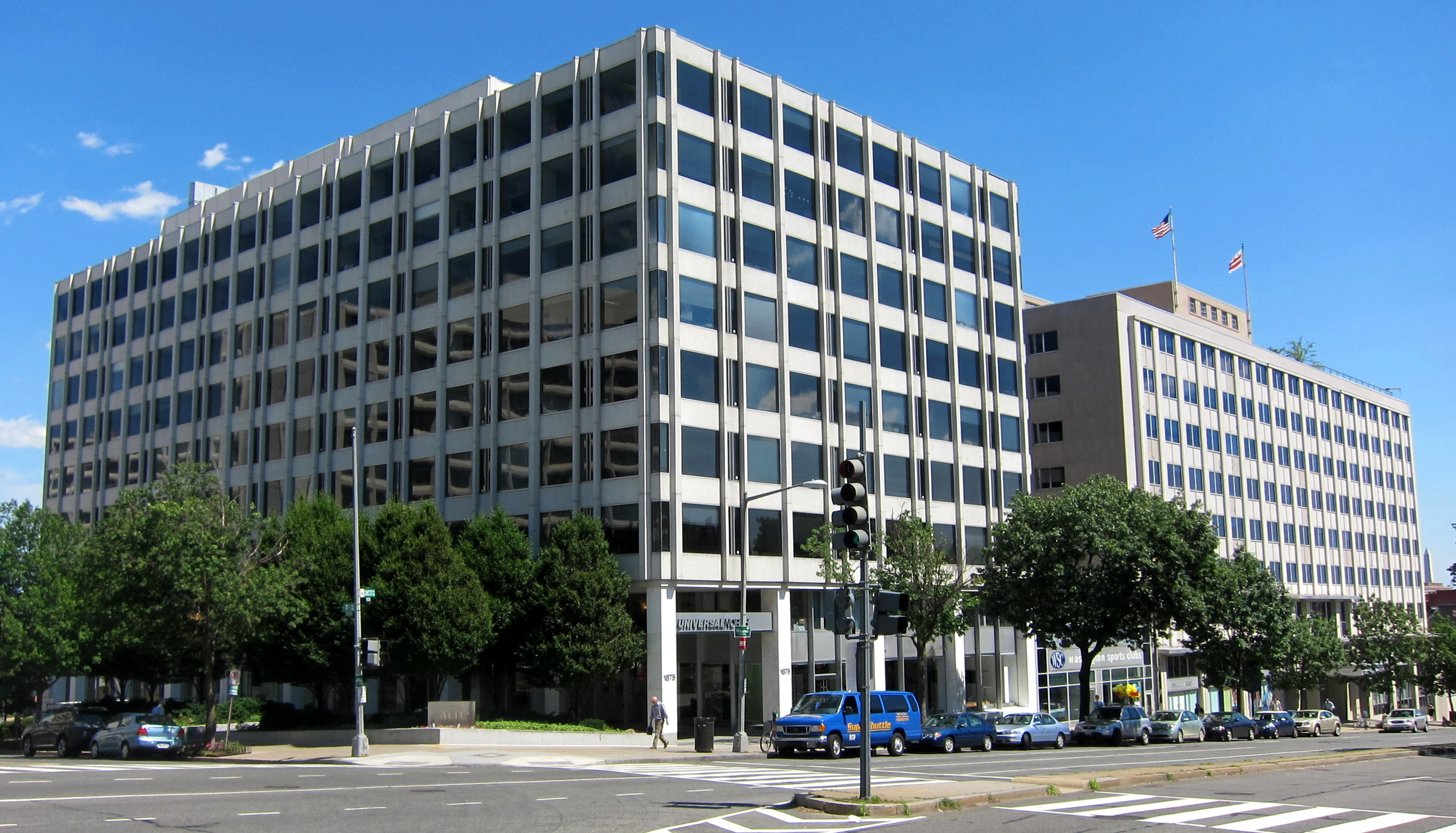
ACS offices in Washington, D.C.

The society was founded on May 22, 1913, by ten physicians and five businessmen in New York City under the name "American Society for the Control of Cancer" (ASCC). The current name was adopted in 1944.

At the time of its founding, the American Society for the Control of Cancer (ASCC)—now known as the American Cancer Society—faced a daunting challenge: it was considered inappropriate to even mention the word cancer in public. The disease was cloaked in fear, stigma, and denial, which created significant barriers to education, diagnosis, and treatment. Recognizing that no real progress could be made until public awareness was raised, the ASCC made education its top priority. A nationwide information campaign was launched to inform doctors, nurses, patients, and families about the realities of cancer and the importance of early detection.

One of the society's most innovative strategies came in 1921, when it commissioned the Eastern Film Corporation, owned by Frederick S. Peck, to produce a silent melodrama titled The Reward of Courage. The film was designed to encourage viewers to visit their physician for regular checkups and to seek medical advice at the first sign of illness.

In addition to film, articles were written for both popular magazines and professional journals to reach a wide audience. To further support its outreach, the ASCC began publishing its own monthly bulletin, Campaign Notes, which featured updates, educational content, and cancer-related information.

To strengthen its efforts, the ASCC also recruited physicians from across the United States to join its mission and help educate the public about cancer—laying the groundwork for future awareness and research initiatives. In 1936, Marjorie Illig, an ASCC field representative, suggested the creation of a network consisting of new volunteers for the purpose of waging "war on cancer". From 1935 to 1938 the number of people involved in cancer control in the US grew from 15,000 to 150,000. According to Working to Give, the Women's Field Army, a group of volunteers working for the ASCC, was primarily responsible for this increase.

The sword symbol, adopted by the American Cancer Society in 1928, was designed by George E. Durant of Brooklyn, New York. According to Durant, the two serpents forming the handle represent the scientific and medical focus of the society's mission, and the blade expresses the "crusading spirit of the cancer control movement".

In 1965, the Federal Cigarette Labeling and Advertising Act of 1965 mandated the first Surgeon General's warning to appear on cigarette packages: "Caution: Cigarette Smoking May Be Hazardous to Your Health." In 1972, Offie Wortham, unaffiliated with ASCC and acting as a private citizen, suggested to the Philadelphia Chapter the creation of a button which said, "HELP! Your smoking is hazardous to my health." Initially, 50,000 buttons were produced, the first evidence of a campaign against secondary smoke. .

In 2012, the American Cancer Society raised $934 million and spent $943 million. This prompted a national consolidation and cost-cutting reorganization in 2013. It centralized its operations and consolidated, merging previous regional affiliates into the parent organization. It also required all employees to reapply for their jobs.

Karen E. Knudsen was named the chief executive officer in 2021. She was the first woman to lead the organization as CEO. Knudsen stepped down in 2024, and as of 2025, the Society is led by an interim executive team.

In 2023, the American Cancer Society sold its Atlanta headquarters at 250 Williams Street NW, marking a shift to a more flexible, hybrid work model for its national staff. While the organization retains a presence in Atlanta, its operations are now distributed nationally with regional offices and remote teams.

== Activities and fund allocation ==
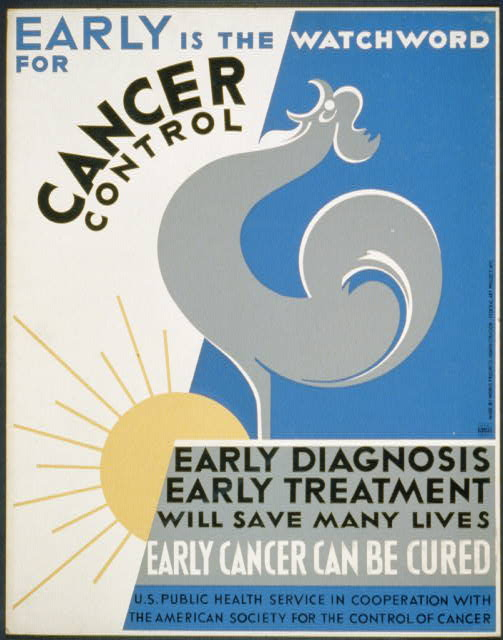
1938 American Society for the Control of Cancer poster

The ACS' activities include providing grants to researchers, including funding 53 Nobel Laureate researchers; discovering the link between smoking and cancer; and serving one million callers every year through its National Cancer Information Center. The Nobel Prize laureates include James D. Watson, Mario Capecchi, Oliver Smithies, Paul Berg, E. Donnall Thomas, and Walter Gilbert. The American Cancer Society's website contained a chronological listing of specific accomplishments in the fight against cancer in which the ACS had a hand, including the funding of various scientists who went on to discover life-saving cancer treatments, and advocating for increased use of preventative techniques.

The organization also runs public health advertising campaigns and organizes projects such as the Great American Smokeout. It operates a series of thrift stores to raise money for its operations.

For the fiscal year ending December 31, 2023, the ACS allocated 81% of its funds to program services, including 52% for patient support, 22% for research, and 7% for advocacy. The remaining 19% was directed toward supporting services, comprising 15% for fundraising and 4% for management and general administration. This meets the Better Business Bureau's Standards for Charity Accountability: Standard 8 (Program Service Expense Ratio) of at least 65% of total expenses spent on program activities.

In 2020, the American Cancer Society launched Gamers Vs Cancer, a series of charity online streams that feature professional gaming live streamers.

Relay For Life, the ACS's signature fundraising event, was established in 1985 by Gordon Klatt. Since its inception, Relay For Life has become a global movement, raising billions of dollars to support cancer research and patient services.

Making Strides Against Breast Cancer is another prominent fundraising event organized by the American Cancer Society. These 3- to 5-mile non-competitive walks have collectively grown into the nation's largest and most impactful breast cancer movement, providing a supportive community for breast cancer survivors, thrivers, caregivers, and families.

The American Cancer Society holds a Four-Star rating from Charity Navigator, the highest possible rating an organization can achieve. This rating designates ACS as an official "Give with Confidence" charity, indicating the organization is using its donations effectively based on Charity Navigator's criteria. Additionally, the ACS holds the Better Business Bureau's Wise Giving Alliance National Charity Seal and the Platinum Seal of Transparency from Candid, demonstrating its commitment to accountability, transparency, and ethical practices.

== Dietary advice ==
The ACS recommends a healthy dietary pattern similar to the Mediterranean diet that consists mostly of plant-based foods (fruits, legumes, vegetables and whole grains) that are high in dietary fibre with fish and poultry, whilst avoiding or limiting intake of red and processed meats to reduce cancer risk. The ACS also recommends people to avoid or limit sugar-sweetened beverages, highly processed foods and refined grains.

In 2020, the ACS in their "Diet and Physical Activity Guideline", stated "evidence that red and processed meats increase cancer risk has existed for decades, and many health organizations recommend limiting or avoiding these foods."

== Evaluations and controversies ==
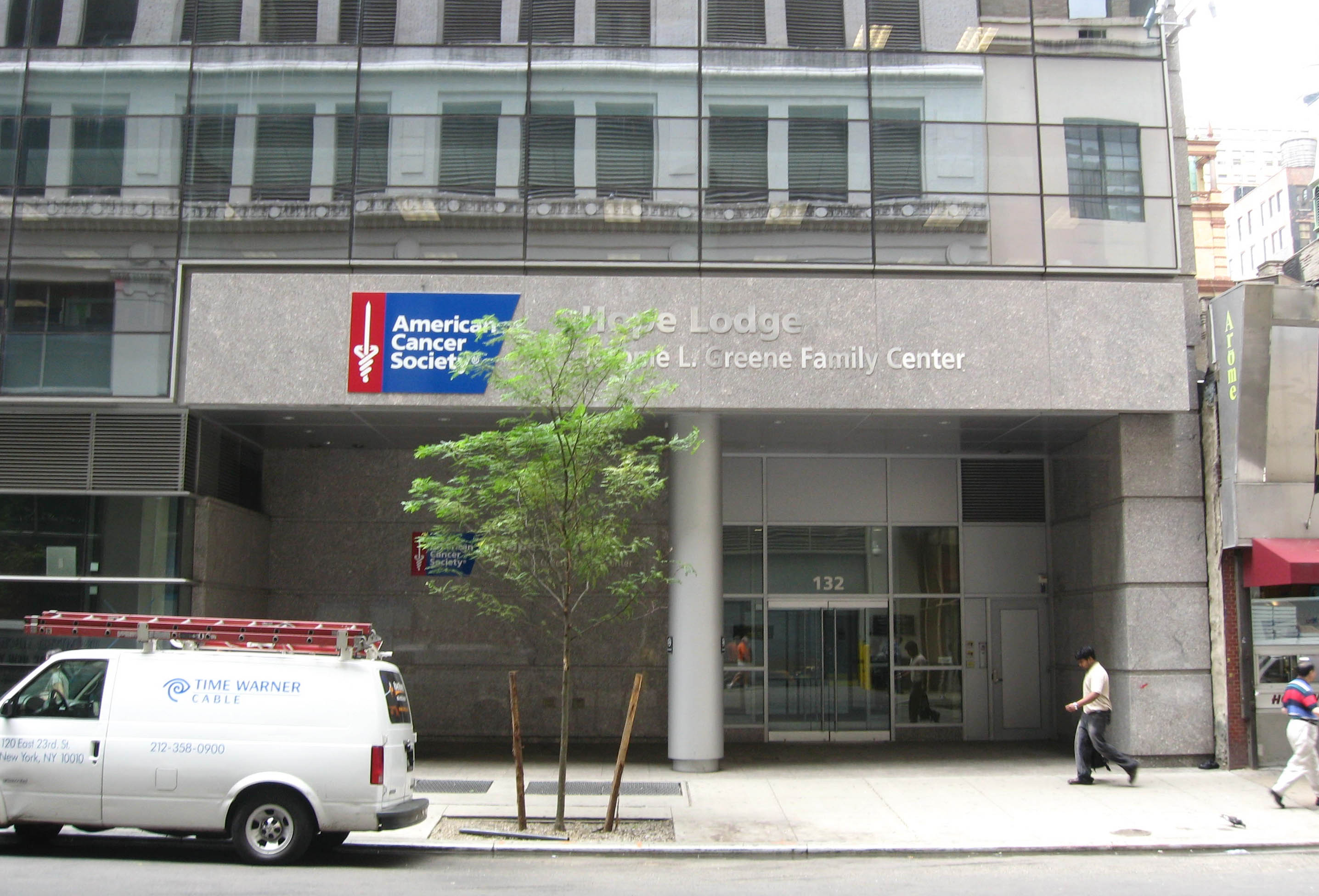
ACS Hope Lodge in Manhattan

In 1994, The Chronicle of Philanthropy, a nonprofit industry publication, released the results of the largest study of charitable and non-profit organization popularity and credibility, conducted by Nye Lavalle & Associates. The study showed that the American Cancer Society was ranked as the tenth "most popular charity/non-profit in America" of over 100 charities researched, with 38% of Americans over the age of 12 choosing "love" and "like a lot" for the ACS.

In 1995, the Arizona chapter of the American Cancer Society was targeted for its extremely high overhead. Two economists, James Bennett and Thomas DiLorenzo, issued a report analyzing the chapter's financial statements and demonstrating that the Arizona chapter used about 95% of its donations for paying salaries and other overhead costs, resulting in a 22 to 1 ratio of overhead to actual money spent on the cause. The report also asserted that the Arizona chapter's annual report had grossly misrepresented the amount of money spent on patient services, inflating it by more than a factor of 10. The American Cancer Society responded by alleging that the economists issuing the report were working for a group funded by the tobacco industry.

As of January 2012, the Better Business Bureau listed American Cancer Society as an accredited charity meeting all of its Standards for Charity Accountability.

For the 2009–2010 fiscal year, then-CEO John R. Seffrin received $2,401,112 salary and compensation from the charity. At that time, this was the second most money given to the head of a charity, according to CharityWatch. The money included $1.5 million in a retention benefit approved in 2001, "to preserve management stability". Seffrin's compensation for the fiscal year ending August 31, 2012, was $832,355.

As of November 2020, using data from 2019, the Charity Navigator gave the American Cancer Society a score of 80.88, earning it a 3-Star rating, with the finance category being scored as 73.13 (2-Star) and the Accountability & Transparency category being scored as 97.00 (4-Star).

In January 2024, the American Cancer Society was once again awarded a 4-star rating from Charity Navigator, with an updated overall score of 99 out of 100. The breakdown includes 99/100 for Accountability and Finance, 100/100 for Leadership and Adaptability, and 96/100 for Culture and Community.

== See also ==
- American Cancer Society Cancer Action Network
- American Cancer Society Center
- Canadian Cancer Society
- Great American Smokeout
- Hope Lodge (American Cancer Society)
- National Cancer Institute
- National Comprehensive Cancer Network
- Programme of Action for Cancer Therapy
- Relay For Life, the signature event of the American Cancer Society
- Making Strides Against Breast Cancer, a nationwide breast cancer walk benefitting the American Cancer Society
