= George Vande Woude =

American cancer researcher (1935–2021)

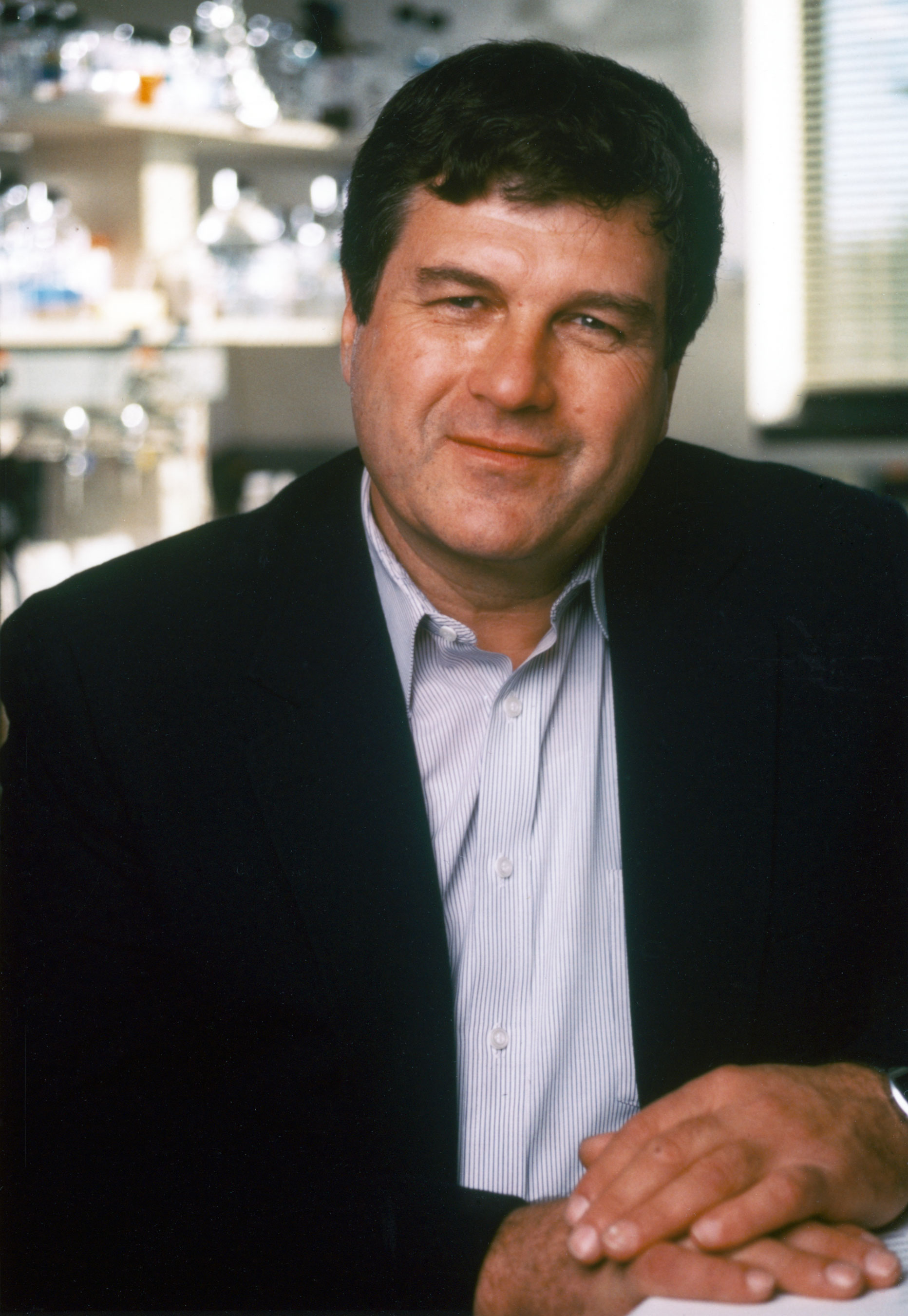
- Born: December 25, 1935; Brooklyn, New York, U.S.
- Died: April 13, 2021 (aged 85); Grand Rapids, Michigan, U.S.
- Education: Hofstra University (BS); Rutgers University (MS, PhD)
- Spouse: Dorothy Vande Woude (née Stapel) (m. 1958; died 2016)

George F. Vande Woude Jr. (December 25, 1935 – April 13, 2021) was an American cancer researcher, who, from 1999 to 2009, served as the founding director of research at the Van Andel Institute (VAI). He is credited with the 1984 discovery of MET, an oncogene.

== Personal life and education ==
George Vande Woude was born in Brooklyn on December 25, 1935, the son of Alice Leudesdorff Vande Woude and George F. Vande Woude Sr.

George Jr. spent his early childhood living in Queens Village, Queens. He attended Hope College for a year before enlisting in the U.S. Army; during his service he was stationed in Baumholder. Following his military service, he attended Hofstra University, from where he received a Bachelor of Science degree. He went on to receive a Master of Science degree in 1962 and a Doctor of Philosophy in 1964, both from Rutgers University. His degrees from Rutgers were in biochemistry, with minors in physical chemistry; he researched under the laboratory of Frank F. Davis. He worked during college by driving a beer truck and operating a floor waxing business with his brother.

While in Queens Village, he lived only a few blocks away from his future wife, Dorothy "Dot". (Note: In full: Dorothy Helen Vande Woude (née Stapel).) The two were married beginning on April 5, 1959, until her death in Belmont, Michigan on July 30, 2016.

George died on April 13, 2021, aged 85, in Grand Rapids, Michigan, (Note: His death place is also sometimes attributed as Belmont, Michigan.) following a battle with Parkinson's disease.

== Career ==
From 1964 to 1972, he worked as a postdoctoral research associate and then a research virologist for the Plum Island Animal Disease Center. He joined the National Cancer Institute (NCI) in 1972, serving as head of both the Human Tumor Studies and the Virus Tumor Biochemistry sections. Vande Woude worked in Building 41 at NCI until internal restructuring moved him to the NCI's branch in Frederick, Maryland.

His positions held within the NCI include head of the Human Tumor Studies and the Virus Tumor Biochemistry sections starting in 1972, chief of the Laboratory of Molecular Oncology starting 1980, and from 1983 until 1998 as director of the Advanced Bioscience Laboratories–Basic Research Program at Frederick.

He left the NCI to take the director position at the VAI in 1998. He stepped down from his director position in 2009, but remained in leadership roles at the institute.

== Selected honors ==
- 1981: Service on editorial board of Journal of Virology through 1987 (Note: Service from 1981 through 1983, 1984 through 1986, and 1987 through 1989, though he became an editor for 1988.)
- 1988: Service as an editor of Journal of Virology through 1992
- 1990: Sole founding editor-in-chief of Cell Growth & Differentiation
- 2006: Elected to the American Academy of Arts & Sciences
- 2007: Edition of Oncogene published in tribute
- 2013: Elected to the inaugural class of Fellows of the AACR Academy
- 2015: Geoffrey Beene Builders of Science Award (with Jay Van Andel), conferred by Research!America
