= Jules A. Hoffmann =

French biologist (born 1941)

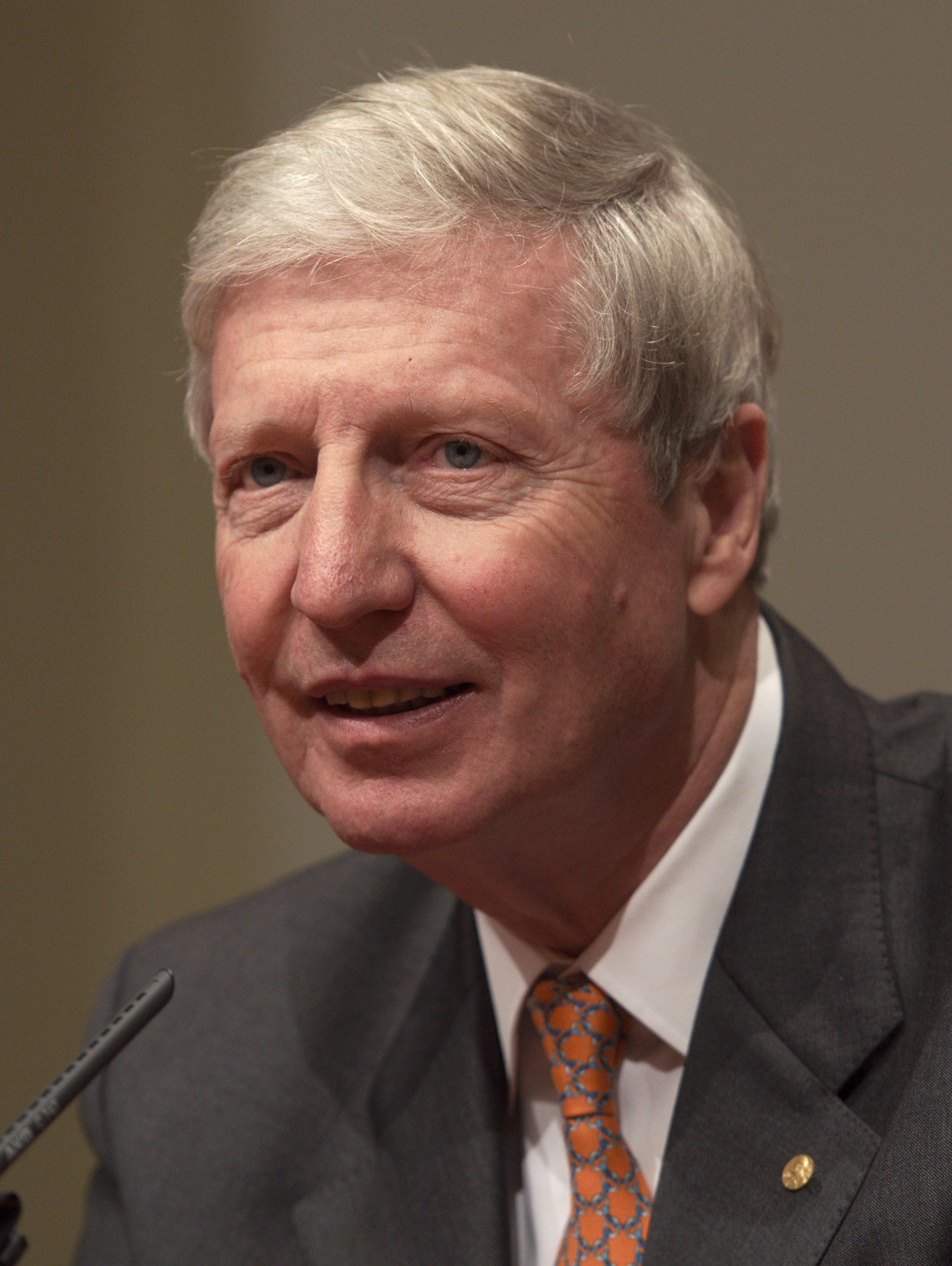
- Hoffmann in 2011
- Born: 2 August 1941 (age 85); Echternach, German-occupied Luxembourg
- Education: University of Strasbourg
- Awards: Balzan Prize (2007); Keio Medical Science Prize (2010); Nobel Prize in Physiology or Medicine (2011); Gairdner Foundation International Award (2011)
- Scientific career
- Fields: Biology
- Workplaces: CNRS, University of Strasbourg, Trinity College Dublin
- Doctoral advisor: Pierre Joly

Jules Alphonse Nicolas Hoffmann (French pronunciation: [ʒyl ɔfman]; born 2 August 1941) is a Luxembourgish-French biologist. During his youth, growing up in Luxembourg, he developed a strong interest in insects under the influence of his father, Jos Hoffmann. This eventually resulted in the younger Hoffmann's dedication to the field of biology using insects as model organisms. He currently holds a faculty position at the University of Strasbourg. He is a research director and member of the board of administrators of the National Center of Scientific Research (CNRS) in Strasbourg, France. He was elected to the positions of Vice-President (2005–2006) and President (2007–2008) of the French Academy of Sciences. Hoffmann and Bruce Beutler were jointly awarded a half share of the 2011 Nobel Prize in Physiology or Medicine for "their discoveries concerning the activation of innate immunity".

Hoffmann and Bruno Lemaitre discovered the function of the fruit fly Toll gene in innate immunity. Its mammalian homologs, the Toll-like receptors, were discovered by Beutler. Toll-like receptors identify constituents of other organisms like fungi and bacteria, and trigger an immune response, explaining, for example, how septic shock can be triggered by bacterial remains.

In 2012, Hoffman was appointed as an Honorary Professor in the School of Biochemistry and Immunology at Trinity College Dublin.

== Education ==
Jules Hoffmann went to the Lycée de Garçons de Luxembourg before leaving to France. Hoffmann received undergraduate degrees in biology and chemistry at the University of Strasbourg, France. In 1969, he completed his Ph.D. in biology also at the University of Strasbourg under Pierre Joly in Laboratory of General Biology at the Institute of Zoology. His post-doctoral training was at the Institut für Physiologische Chemie at Philipps-Universität in Marburg an der Lahn, Germany, in 1973–1974.

== Studies and Research Careers ==
During his Ph.D. program under Pierre Joly, Hoffmann started his research in studying antimicrobial defenses in grasshoppers, inspired by the previous works done in the laboratory of Pierre Joly showing that no opportunistic infections were apparent in insects after the transplantation of certain organs from one to another. Hoffmann confirmed discovery of phagocytosis done by Eli Metchnikoff, through injection of Bacillus thuringiensis and observation of increase of phagocytes. In addition, he showed strong correlation between hematopoiesis and antimicrobial defenses by assessing the susceptibility of an insect to the microbial infection after X-ray treatment. Hoffmann shifts from using grasshopper model to using dipteran species in the 80s. By using Phormia terranovae, Hoffmann and his colleagues were able to identify 82-residues long antimicrobial polypeptide named Diptericin which was glycine-rich, along with other polypeptides in Drosophila melanogaster such as Defensin, Cecropin, and Attacin. Further molecular genetic analysis revealed that the promoters for the genes encoding these antimicrobial peptides contained DNA sequences similar to the binding elements for NF-κB in mammalian DNA. Dorsal gene, critical in dorso-ventral patterning in the early embryo of Drosophila melanogaster was also identified to be in this NF-κB family. It was initially speculated by Hoffmann and colleagues that activity of Dorsal was directly linked to the expression of the Diptericin gene. However, it turned out that Diptericin was normally induced even in the loss-of-function Dorsal mutants. Further conducted research showed that Diptericin expression was dependent on the expression of imd gene. Identification of another antifungal peptide named Drosomycin and RNA blots demonstrated that two distinct pathways(Toll, Imd) exist, involving Drosomycin and Diptericin respectively. Similarities of structure and function between several members in the Drosophila embryo and members in mammals being noted, study "The Dorsoventral Regulatory Gene Cassette spätzle/Toll/cactus Controls the Potent Antifungal Response in Drosophila Adults" by Lemaitre and Hoffmann in 1996 illuminated the possible existing innate immunity in Drosophila in response to fungal challenge. Later works identified that Toll transmembrane receptors are present in a wide variety of phyla and are conserved through evolution along with conservation of NF-κB activating cascades.

Hoffmann was a research assistant at CNRS from 1964 to 1968, and became a research associate in 1969. Since 1974 he has been a Research Director of CNRS. Between 1978 and 2005 he was Director of the CNRS research unit "Immune Response and Development in Insects", and from 1994 to 2005 he was director of the Institute of Molecular and Cellular Biology of CNRS in Strasbourg.

Hoffmann is a member of the German Academy of Sciences Leopoldina, the French Academy of Sciences, the European Molecular Biology Organization (EMBO), the United States National Academy of Sciences, the American Academy of Arts and Sciences, the Fondation Écologie d'Avenir and the Russian Academy of Sciences.

Hoffmann became a Commander of the Legion of Honour in 2012.

In 2015, Hoffmann signed the Mainau Declaration 2015 on Climate Change on the final day of the 65th Lindau Nobel Laureate Meeting. The declaration was signed by a total of 76 Nobel Laureates and handed to then-President of the French Republic, François Hollande, as part of the successful COP21 climate summit in Paris.

== Controversy ==
Bruno Lemaitre, a research associate in the Hoffmann laboratory at the time when the major work on Drosophila innate immunity was conducted (for which Hoffmann was awarded the Nobel), claims he was inadequately recognized by Hoffmann as the instigator of and main contributor to the Nobel-winning work. Lemaitre now supervises his own laboratory at the École Polytechnique Fédérale de Lausanne in Switzerland.

== Awards ==
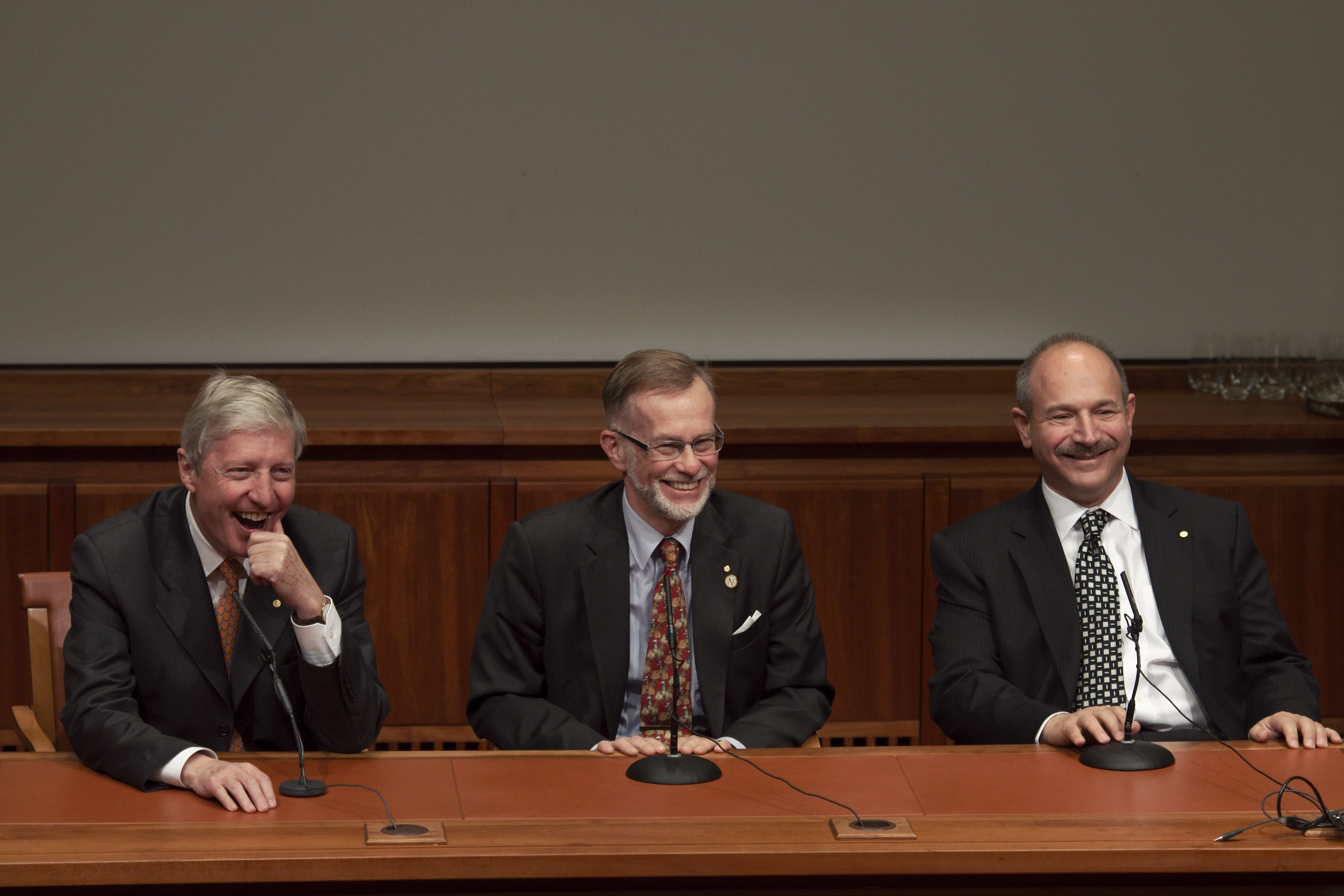
Hoffmann, Göran K. Hansson (chairman of the Nobel Committee for Physiology or Medicine) and Bruce Beutler

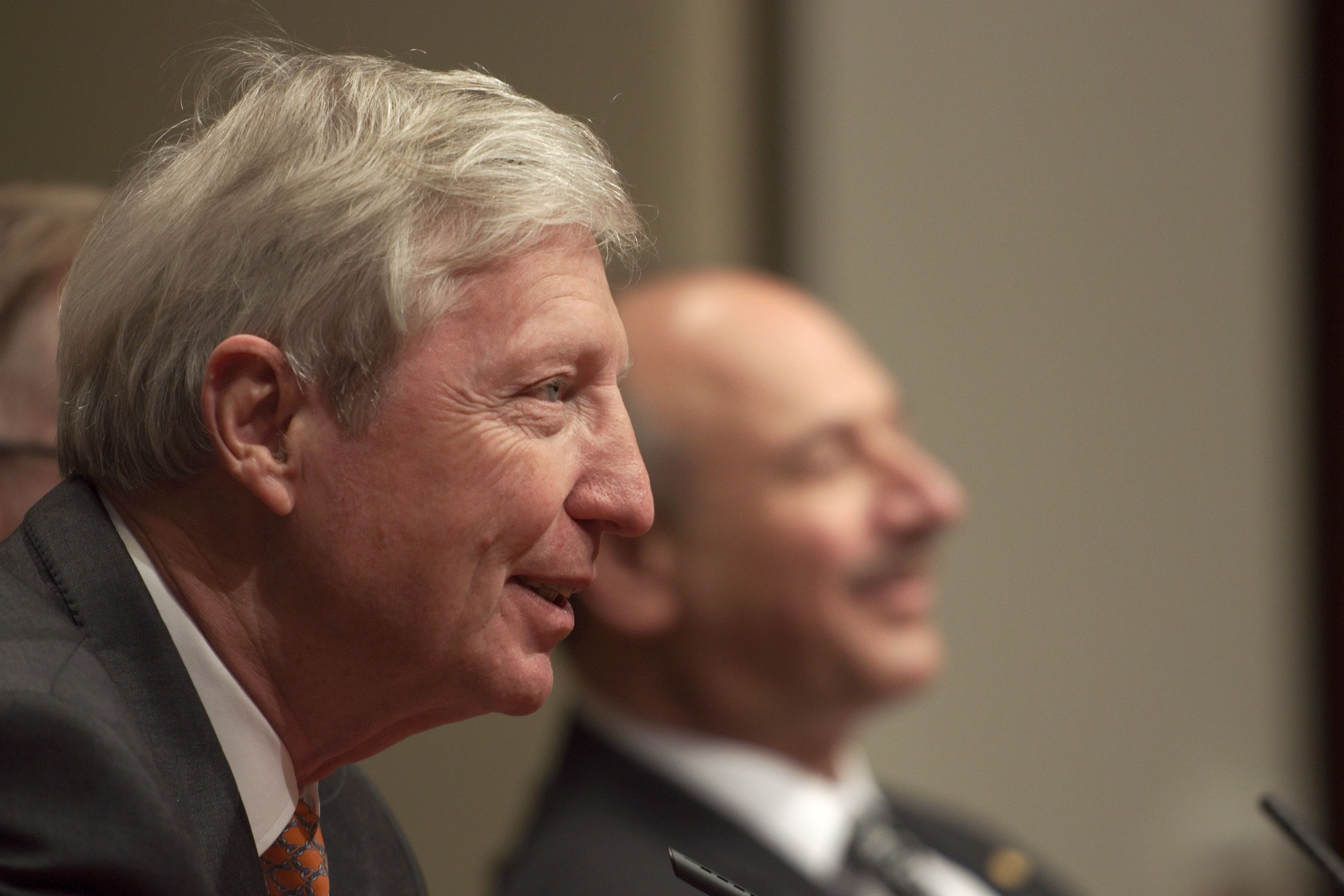
Hoffmann and Bruce Beutler

- 2003 Cancer Research Institute William B. Coley Award
- 2004 Robert Koch Prize
- 2007 Balzan Prize together with Bruce A. Beutler for Innate Immunity
- 2010 Lewis S. Rosenstiel Award (shared with Ruslan M. Medzhitov)
- 2010 Keio Medical Science Prize
- 2011 Gairdner Foundation International Award (shared with Shizuo Akira)
- 2011 Shaw Prize (shared with Bruce A. Beutler and Ruslan M. Medzhitov)
- 2011 CNRS Gold medal
- 2011 Nobel Prize in Physiology or Medicine (shared with Bruce Beutler and Ralph M. Steinman)
