= Cancer (journal) =

- Discipline: Oncology
- Language: English
- Edited by: Suresh S. Ramalingam

Publication details
- History: 1948–present
- Publisher: Wiley-Blackwell on behalf of the American Cancer Society (United States)
- Frequency: Biweekly
- Impact factor: 6.1 (2023)

Standard abbreviations
- ISO 4: Cancer

Indexing
- CODEN: CANCAR
- ISSN: 0008-543X (print); 1097-0142 (web)
- LCCN: 50001289
- OCLC no.: 01553275

Links
- Journal homepage; Online access; Online archive

Cancer is a biweekly peer-reviewed scientific journal covering oncology. The journal was established in 1948. It is an official journal of the American Cancer Society and is published by Wiley-Blackwell on behalf of the society. The first editor-in-chief was Fred W. Stewart, who held that position until 1961. The current editor-in-chief is Suresh S. Ramalingam, and the previous one was Fadlo R. Khuri. Cancer Cytopathology was published as a section from 1997 until 2008, when it was split into a separate journal.

== Abstracting and indexing ==
The journal is abstracted and indexed in:

- Academic OneFile
- Academic Search
- Biological Abstracts
- BIOSIS Previews
- CAB Abstracts
- Chemical Abstracts
- CINAHL
- Current Contents/Clinical Medicine
- Current Contents/Life Sciences
- Current Index to Statistics
- Elsevier BIOBASE
- Embase
- Global Health
- Index Medicus/MEDLINE/PubMed
- International Bibliography of Periodical Literature
- PASCAL
- PsycINFO
- Science Citation Index
- Scopus
- Tropical Diseases Bulletin

According to the Journal Citation Reports, the journal has a 2015 impact factor of 5.649, ranking it 26th out of 211 journals in the category "Oncology".
