= Abdou Rachid Thiam =

Senegalese scientist

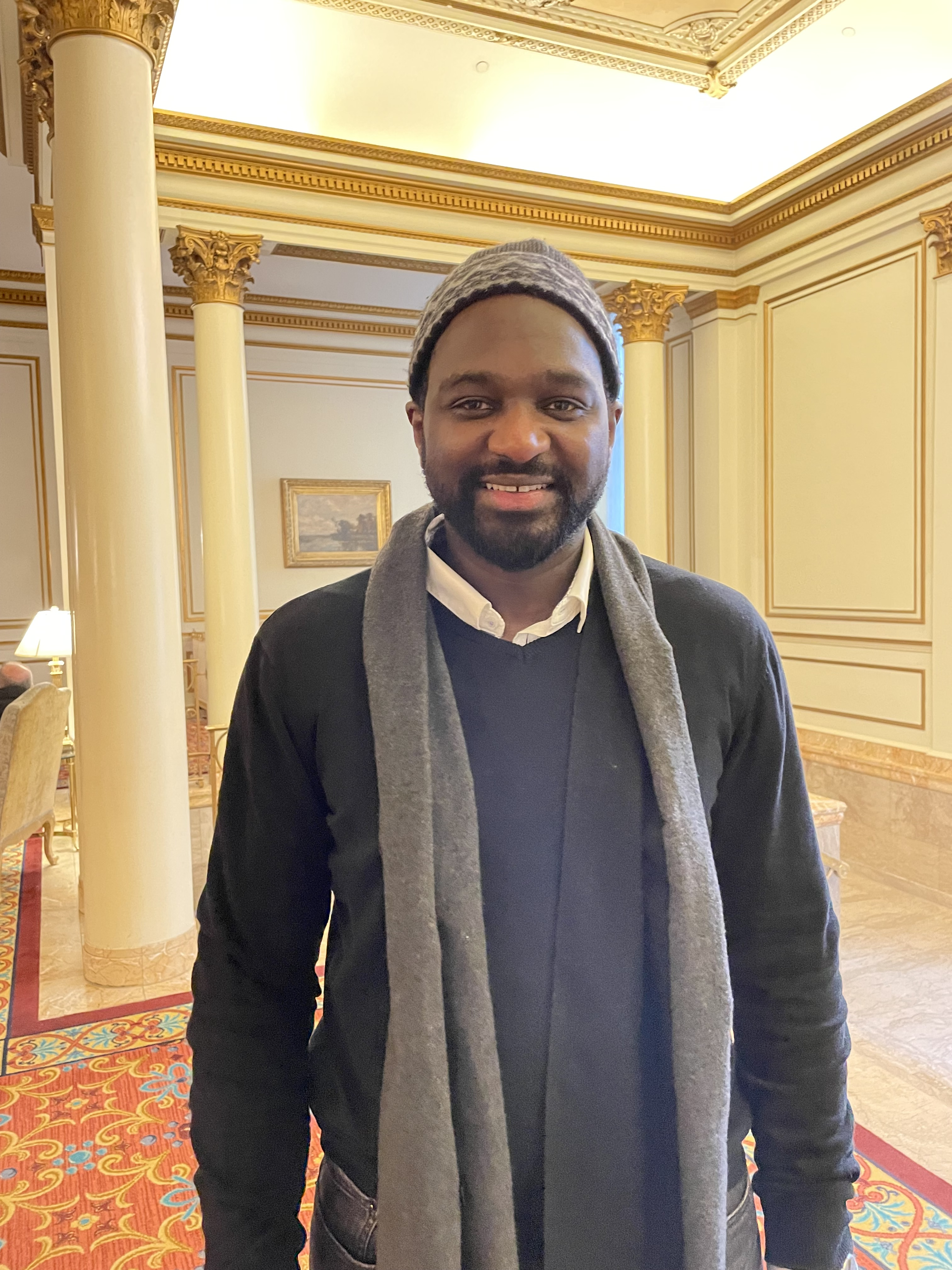
- Abdou Rachid Thiam at the 2023 Keystone Symposia Conference on Biomolecular Condensates in Vancouver
- Born: Dakar, Senegal
- Education: Pierre and Marie Curie University
- Known for: lipid droplets
- Scientific career
- Workplaces: Ecole Normale Superieure; Yale University
- Website: https://arthiam.com/

Abdou Rachid Thiam is a Senegalese biophysicist and research director at the French National Centre for Scientific Research and Ecole Normale Superieure in Paris, France (UMR 8023), where he studies physical mechanisms regulating the dynamics of lipid droplets in cells and in vitro. His work integrates approaches from physics and cell biology.

== Education and career ==
Thiam earned a Bachelor of Science from ESPCI Paris before conducting his doctoral research at Pierre and Marie Curie University in Paris on the stability of emulsions using microfluidics.

After his PhD, he moved to Yale University in 2012 with a Marie Curie fellowship to conduct postdoctoral research in the team of Nobel prize Laureate James E. Rothman, before starting his own research group at CNRS in 2014. In 2024 he co-founded Oria Bioscience, a biotechnology startup company focused on applying advances in cell biology and biophysics to drug development and pharmaceutical innovation.

== Research contributions ==
In his early research, Thiam examined the stability and interfacial properties of emulsions using microfluidic techniques. In his subsequent research, he has examined how lipid droplets form from cellular membranes and how their physical properties influence their behavior and interactions within cells. In particular, lipid droplets originate from the endoplasmic reticulum and are governed by interfacial properties such as surface tension and membrane composition, which affect their formation and morphology.

He also uses simplified and reconstituted experimental systems to model intracellular processes, enabling quantitative analysis of membrane behavior and lipid droplet dynamics under controlled physical conditions.

== Awards and recognition ==
Abdou Rachid Thiam was awarded the fr:Prix Claude-Paoletti from the CNRS in 2018, a CNRS Bronze medal in 2020, and the Thomas E. Thompson Award from the Biophysical Society in 2022. He was awarded the Liliane Bettencourt Prize for Life Sciences in 2025, a European scientific prize recognizing outstanding contributions in biomedical research.

== Highly cited papers as an independent researcher ==
- M'barek KR, Ajjaji D, Chorlay A, Vanni S, Forêt L, Thiam AR. ER membrane phospholipids and surface tension control cellular lipid droplet formation. Developmental Cell. 2017 41(6):591-604. (Cited 296 times as of 2026, according to Google Scholar.)
- Thiam AR, Beller M. The why, when and how of lipid droplet diversity. Journal of cell science. 2017 Jan 15;130(2):315-24. (Cited 343 times as of 2026, according to Google Scholar.)
- Wang H, Becuwe M, Housden BE, Chitraju C, Porras AJ, Graham MM, Liu XN, Thiam AR, Savage DB, Agarwal AK, Garg A. Seipin is required for converting nascent to mature lipid droplets. elife. 2016 Aug 26;5:e16582. (Cited 461 times as of 2026, according to Google Scholar)
