= European Institute of Chemistry and Biology =

French research institute

- Institut européen de chimie et de biologie
- Abbreviation: IECB
- Type: Research institute
- Location: Pessac, France
- Key people: Antoine Loquet (Director)
- Affiliations: CNRS; Inserm; University of Bordeaux

The European Institute of Chemistry and Biology (IECB) is a multidisciplinary research institute based in Pessac, France. The institute was founded in 1998 as a joint initiative of major French research organizations, with the support of the Regional Council of Aquitaine. It is affiliated with the French National Centre for Scientific Research (CNRS), the National Institute of Health and Medical Research (Inserm), and the University of Bordeaux, and serves as an incubator for international and interdisciplinary research teams. IECB was directed by Valérie Gabelica, an Inserm research director from 2021 to 2023, before the current director, Antoine Loquet, took over.

== Governance and organisation ==
The institute operates under joint supervision from CNRS, Inserm, and the University of Bordeaux. Its governance model is designed to host independent research teams within a shared infrastructure while maintaining links to national research organisations. Research teams are selected for fixed-term hosting, typically for a maximum of ten years, including an initial evaluation period followed by renewable contracts. Approximately fifteen research teams, representing around 150 researchers, engineers, and students, are based at the institute.

== Research activities ==
Research at IECB focuses on interdisciplinary topics at the interface of chemistry, molecular biology, structural biology, and biophysics. The institute provides shared technological platforms that support structural and molecular analysis used across multiple research programmes.

== Innovation and economic role ==
The IECB also contributes to regional innovation through links with industry and support for technology transfer and startup creation. The institute hosts early-stage companies originating from academic research, including the biotechnology startup Ureka. Through their work and support, the institute has, over time, become part of the broader life-science and biotechnology ecosystem in Bordeaux.
