= Hope Lodge (American Cancer Society) =

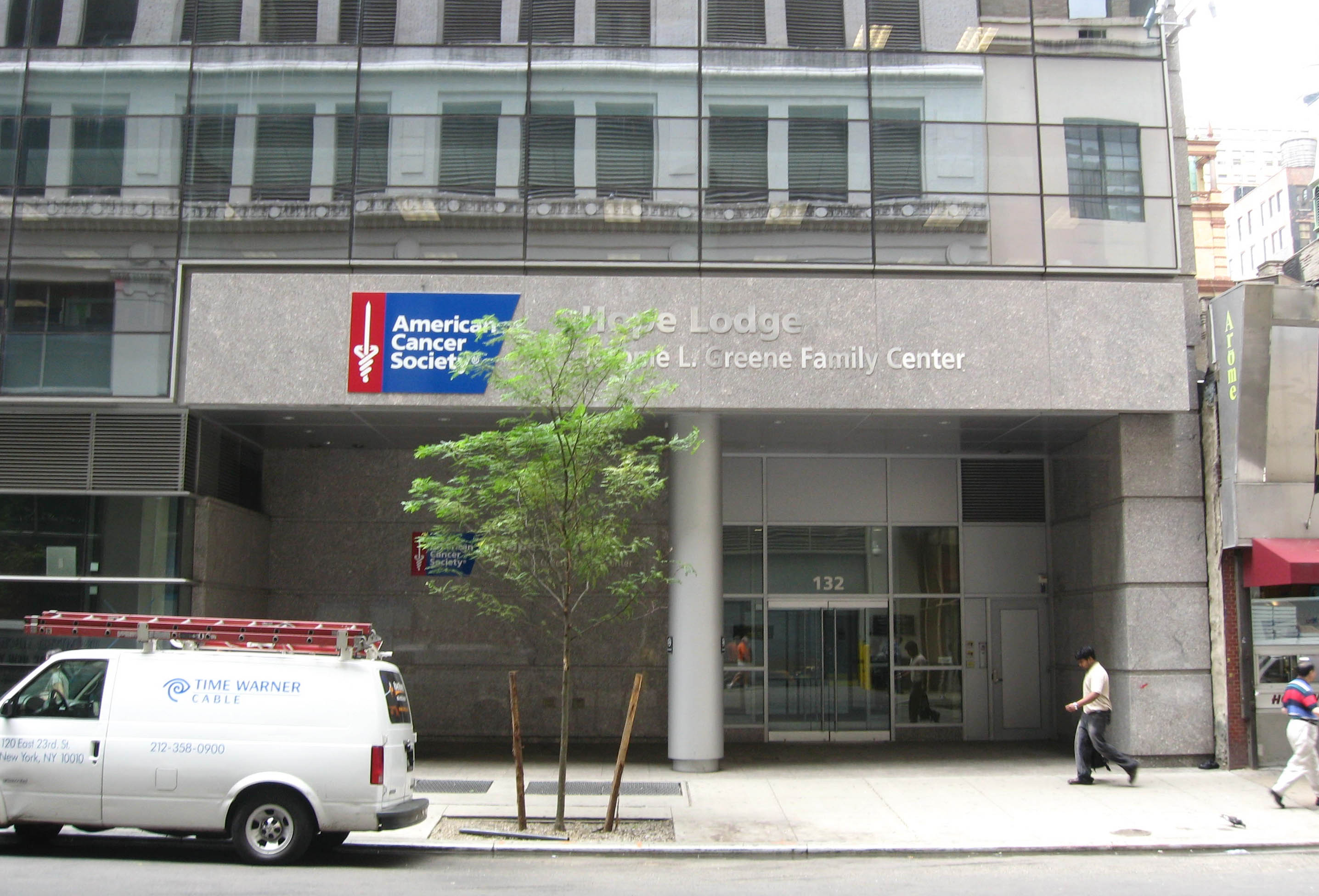
ACS Hope Lodge in Manhattan

Hope Lodge is a program operated by the American Cancer Society (ACS) that provides free lodging to cancer patients and their caregivers when treatment is required away from home. Patients must be receiving active cancer treatment and live more than 40 miles or one hour from their treatment center. Each guest must be accompanied by a caregiver during their stay.

== History ==
The Hope Lodge program began in Charleston, South Carolina, in 1970. The first facility was founded by Margot Freudenberg (1895–1993), a local civic leader and longtime volunteer for the American Cancer Society. She was inspired by a similar patient housing program she observed during a trip to Australia and New Zealand with President Dwight D. Eisenhower's People to People Ambassador Program.

== Services and Impact ==
As of 2025, the American Cancer Society operates 31 Hope Lodge locations across the United States, including one in San Juan, Puerto Rico. Guests stay in private or semi-private rooms, and most facilities include community kitchens, laundry facilities, and spaces for social interaction.

Hope Lodge services are offered free of charge regardless of income, thanks to donations from individuals, corporate sponsors, and community partners. Eligibility requires the patient to be in active cancer treatment and accompanied by a caregiver.

Collectively, the Hope Lodge network provides more than 500,000 nights of free lodging each year, saving patients and families over $50 million annually in hotel costs.

== COVID-19 Pandemic and Recovery ==
Many Hope Lodge locations were temporarily closed in 2020 due to the COVID-19 pandemic to protect immunocompromised guests. Some reopened with limited capacity or modified operations in subsequent years. As of 2024, ACS continues working to reopen or repurpose several affected locations.

== Locations ==
The American Cancer Society operates more than 30 Hope Lodge Communities across the United States and Puerto Rico. These facilities offer a supportive, home-like environment for patients and caregivers traveling away from home for cancer treatment.

=== List of Hope Lodge Communities ===
As of 2025, active Hope Lodge Communities include:

City	State/Territory
Atlanta	Georgia
Baltimore	Maryland
Birmingham	Alabama
Boston	Massachusetts
Burlington	Vermont
Charleston	South Carolina
Cleveland	Ohio
Dallas	Texas
Greenville	North Carolina
Honolulu	Hawaii
Houston	Texas
Iowa City	Iowa
Jackson	Mississippi
Jacksonville	Florida
Kansas City	MIssouri
Lexington	Kentucky
Lubbock	Texas
Memphis	Tennessee
Minneapolis	Minnesota
Nashville	Tennessee
New Orleans	Louisiana
New York City	New York
Oklahoma City	Oklahoma
Omaha	Nebraska
Philadelphia	Pennsylvania
Rochester	Minnesota
Rochester	New York
Salt Lake City	Utah
San Juan	Puerto Rico
St. Louis	Missouri
Tampa	Florida

== See also ==
- Ronald McDonald House Charities – offers similar lodging to families of pediatric patients
- American Cancer Society
