= American Cancer Society Cancer Action Network =

American nonprofit advocacy organization

- Founded: 2001
- Purpose: "Holding lawmakers accountable for their words and their actions" relating to cancer.
- Location: Washington, DC
- Region served: United States, Puerto Rico
- Method: Lobbying and media campaigns.
- Key people: Karen E. Knudsen CEO ACS, and ACS CAN, Lisa Lacasse, President, ACS CAN. 18 member board of directors.
- Website: www.fightcancer.org

The American Cancer Society Cancer Action Network (ACS CAN) is a nonprofit, nonpartisan advocacy affiliate of the American Cancer Society. It was founded in September 2001 to directly lobby with the goals of the American Cancer Society, which is subject to restrictions on advocacy activities because of its tax classification. ACS CAN works to make cancer a national priority. Specifically, it advocates for better access to care, cancer prevention and early detection programs, cancer research funding, regulation of tobacco by the U.S. Food and Drug Administration, better quality of life for cancer patients, and attempts to raise awareness of and reduce cancer disparities.

== Campaigns ==
ACS CAN's advocacy efforts are targeted at specific cancer-related issues.

=== Access to healthcare ===
Like the American Cancer Society, ACS CAN is devoting a significant portion of its resources to raising public awareness of shortcomings in the US health care system from the perspective of cancer patients. Recently, the Patient Protection and Affordable Care Act, supported by the American Cancer Society and ACS CAN, was signed into law by President Barack Obama and has multiple provisions which will gradually take effect over several years. Under the Affordable Care Act, patients are protected from discrimination by insurance companies against people with pre-existing conditions, such as cancer, and insurance companies can no longer drop a person if he or she gets sick. These provisions ultimately reduce cost burden on patients and their families. Further, the law prohibits companies from denying coverage to children with pre-existing conditions, eliminates lifetime benefit limits and annual benefit limits that can cause sudden termination of health care coverage, and allows children to stay on their parent’s health plan until the age of 26. Also, if a person has been uninsured for at least 6 months and have a health condition, he or she may be eligible for the Pre-existing Condition Insurance Plan. Seniors also will receive many preventative services for free such as cancer screenings. According to the ACS CAN, these rulings will expand access to quality health care for cancer patients, decrease cost burden, and refocus health care emphasis on prevention.

=== Cancer research funding ===
The US government is the largest funder of cancer research via the National Institutes of Health (NIH), Centers for Disease Control and Prevention (CDC), yet recent budgets have not provided for increases that make up for increases in medical inflation. The recent failure of the United States Congress Joint Select Committee on Deficit Reduction to come to an agreement about federal budget cuts has caused ACS CAN and other health advocates to fear reduction in services and investment in biomedical research through the NIH. Reduction in NIH funding may lead to lower chances of cancer research breakthroughs and interrupt clinical trials at the National Cancer Institute, according to ACS CAN vice president of federal relations and strategic alliances, Dick Woodruff.

=== Tobacco regulation ===
ACS CAN supports efforts to grant the Food and Drug Administration regulatory control over tobacco products. Their efforts include tobacco use prevention and cessation programs, increasing tobacco taxes, and enacting smoke-free laws. ACS CAN states that tobacco use prevention, especially in a "new generation of young smokers", would be the most effective way to reduce exposure to smoke and reduce health risks, including lung cancer. However, states have recently cut funding for tobacco use prevention programs by 12 percent this year, adding up to a 36 percent funding cut over the past four years.

Under the 1998 Tobacco Master Settlement Agreement, states are to receive $246 billion in tobacco industry payments from tobacco companies to compensate for smoking-related health care costs over 25 years. In the Fiscal Year 2012, states will collect $25.6 billion in revenue in tobacco taxes and legal settlements from the 1998 settlement. However, only $45.6 million, or 1.8 percent of that collection will be spent on programs to prevent or stop tobacco use. The CDC recommends $3.7 billion for tobacco cessation and prevention programs, meaning that the allotted $45.6 million is only 12 percent of the recommendation. Of the 50 states, 33 states and the District of Columbia are spending less than a quarter of the recommended amount. Connecticut, Nevada, New Hampshire, Ohio, and the District of Columbia did not allocate any funding for tobacco prevention programs this year. Only Alaska is meeting or exceeding its CDC recommendation for the year by spending $10.8 million.

Recently the organization has made a major push against electronic cigarettes. There is currently no research which links electronic cigarettes and cancer.

=== National Breast and Cervical Cancer Early Detection Program (NBCCEDP) ===
ACS CAN actively seeks additional funds for the NBCCEDP, which provides breast and cervical cancer screenings for low-income women throughout the United States.

The program, started in 1991, is administered by the CDC and in addition to breast and cervical cancer screenings, it provides follow-up services and information to low-income women between 50 and 64 who are at most risk to breast and cervical cancer. This includes uninsured, underinsured, and racial and ethnic minority women. Services provided under NBCCEDP include clinical breast examinations, mammograms, pap smears, pelvic examinations, diagnostic testing for abnormal results, and treatment referrals. Since 1991, the program has provided more than 9.8 million breast and cervical cancer screenings, and diagnosed more than 52,694 breast cancers, 2,856 invasive cervical cancers, and 136,837 premalignant cervical lesions.

ACS CAN works to reauthorize and increase funding for NBCCEDP since it has been at risk for recent budget cuts. Although NBCCEDP has served over 3.9 million women, the program serves less than one in five eligible women at the current funding levels. Some states have been forced to reject people who would be eligible for free mammograms and Pap smears due to state budget cuts. In 2009, 14 states cut budgets for free cancer screenings: Colorado, Minnesota, Connecticut, South Carolina, Utah, Missouri, Washington, Ohio, Massachusetts, Arkansas, Montana, Illinois, Pennsylvania, and Alabama.

In 2006, Senators Barbara Mikulski and Kay Bailey Hutchison introduced a bill, supported by ACS CAN, to allow for greater program flexibility and a funding increase of $45 million allowing an additional 130,000 eligible women access to NBCCEDP. In 2007, President George W. Bush reauthorized NBCCEDP, setting the fiscal year 2010 funding level at $250 million, but Congress provided $215 million. Further, NBCCEDP faces a 10 percent cut in the CDC budget, resulting in 40,000 fewer underserved women being screened.

=== Judicial Advocacy Initiative ===
ACS CAN and ACS file "friend of the court" briefs in cases that may affect the cancer community.

=== Plant It Pink ===
ACS CAN’s campaign, "Plant It Pink", aims to raise awareness of the fight against breast cancer and to raise funds by planting thousands of Pink Impression tulip bulbs around America. Several states have participated in this event including Illinois, Iowa, Minnesota, Kansas, Missouri, Nebraska, Ohio, Oklahoma, South Dakota, and Wisconsin. The goal is to plant Pink Impression bulbs throughout the states to honor the men and women who will be diagnosed with cancer this year. 800 Pink Impression tulip bulbs were planted in the shape of a 20-foot long ribbon at Ingalls Cancer Care Center in Tinley Park, Illinois, by Ingalls Cancer Research Ambassadors. The tulip bulbs were planted in the fall and are expected to bloom this spring.

== Events ==
Each year, ACS CAN hosts a training and lobbying event in Washington, D.C., for top tier volunteers called Leadership Summit & Lobby Day. More than 500 volunteers and staff meet with their lawmakers during this event to talk about cancer issues.

In 2002 and 2006, ACS CAN hosted massive lobbying events in Washington, D.C., called Celebration on the Hill. In 2002 and 2006, they hosted 4,000 and 10,000 cancer patients, survivors and advocates as part of this event, respectively. In 2006 ACS CAN successfully met with the office of every member of the United States Congress, an unprecedented achievement for a nonprofit health organization. Attendees were treated to live music, public speakers, and a host of onsite activities, as well as the erection of the American Cancer Society Wall of Hope, a temporary monument to cancer survivorship that covered two city blocks.

== Publicity ==
On November 6, 2011, ACS CAN premiered its second-ever national television ad on Meet the Press to ask Congress to remember the lives lost to cancer and the 12 million cancer survivors living in America at the time. ACS CAN produced the ad to push to Congress to make cancer a national priority when addressing the country’s budget deficit. The ad features the Wall of Hope which was created during ACS CAN’s Celebration on the Hill in 2006. The wall held 1,584 sticky notes with messages from people across America to their loved ones who have battled cancer.

The 30-second TV ad were part of a larger national grassroots campaign to protect federal funding for cancer research at the National Institutes of Health and the National Cancer Institute, and to maintain funding for the Centers for Disease Control and Prevention’s programs that promote prevention and early detection of cancer, and laws and programs that expand access to affordable health care.

ACS CAN’s national TV ad was aired on major cable networks such as CNN, Fox News Channel, and MSNBC in November and December as Congress and the Super Committee met to address ways to reduce federal spending.

== Staff ==
Dr. Karen Knudsen is the chief executive officer of the American Cancer Society and the American Cancer Society Cancer Action Network. The President of ACS CAN is Lisa Lacasse.

Members of the affiliate include cancer survivors, caregivers, patients, volunteers, and students, including Colleges Against Cancer.

== Publications ==
- How Do You Measure Up?
- Colorectal Cancer Legislation Report Card
