= Valérie Gabelica =

Belgian chemist and research director

- Education: University of Liège (PhD, 2002)
- Awards: Liliane Bettencourt Prize for Life Sciences (2021); Inserm Research Prize (2022); Dr. and Mrs. Henri Labbé Prize (2018); ERC Consolidator Grant (2014)
- Scientific career
- Fields: Analytical chemistry Mass spectrometry Biophysics
- Workplaces: Institut national de la santé et de la recherche médicale (INSERM); Centre national de la recherche scientifique (CNRS) European Institute of Chemistry and Biology (IECB); University of Geneva

Valérie Gabelica is a Belgian chemist and research director known for her work in mass spectrometry as applied to nucleic acids, particularly DNA and RNA. She has served as a research director at the French National Institute of Health and Medical Research (INSERM) and has held leadership positions at institutions including the European Institute of Chemistry and Biology (IECB) and, as of 2024, the University of Geneva. Her research combines analytical chemistry, biophysics, and structural biology to develop methods for probing the structure and interactions of nucleic acids. She was awarded the Liliane Bettencourt Prize for Life Sciences in 2021 by the Foundation Bettencourt Schueller. Gabelica's scientific contributions have been discussed in independent institutional contexts, specifically her development of innovative mass spectrometry techniques.

== Early life and education ==
Valérie Gabelica earned her doctorate (PhD) in sciences in 2002 from the University of Liège in Belgium, where she applied mass spectrometry to the analysis of structural modifications in nucleic acids. She then conducted postdoctoral research at the Institute of Pharmaceutical Chemistry in Frankfurt as a Humboldt fellow and later joined the Mass Spectrometry Laboratory in Liège, where she held a permanent research associate position.

== Research career ==
In 2013 Gabelica moved to France to join the Institut Européen de Chimie et Biologie (IECB) in Pessac, supported by the ATIP-Avenir program. She became a research director at INSERM and led a team within the laboratory “Acides nucléiques: régulations naturelles et artificielles”. Her research addresses fundamental and applied questions in chemical biology, focusing on mass spectrometry techniques to study nucleic acid structures and interactions. She served as director of the IECB from 2021 to 2023. In January 2024, she was appointed a full professor of analytical chemistry at the University of Geneva.

== Scientific contributions ==
Gabelica's research integrates analytical chemistry and biophysics to improve how mass spectrometry measures nucleic acids without distorting their native structures. Her work has helped clarify how chemical modifications influence the three-dimensional form of DNA and RNA, enabling insight into genetic regulation and the behavior of biomolecular complexes. These methodological advancements assist in identifying interactions and conformations of nucleic acids, which are relevant in fields such as gene regulation and therapeutic development. Her team's innovations in combining mass spectrometry with complementary analytical approaches have generated discussion within the biophysical and analytical chemistry communities.

== Awards and honours ==
Liliane Bettencourt Prize for Life Sciences (2021) – awarded by the Fondation Bettencourt Schueller for her contributions to life sciences research, particularly in nucleic acid analysis.

Inserm Research Prize (2022) – acknowledging her innovation in mass spectrometry and its application to biomolecular structural studies.

Dr. and Mrs. Henri Labbé Prize (2018) – awarded by the French Academy of Sciences for contributions in analytical chemistry and chemical biology.

ERC Consolidator Grant (2014) – supported her research program early in her career.

== Impact and recognition ==
Gabelica's work has been cited for its influence on analytical chemistry and structural biology, highlighting the use of her techniques to understand fundamental nucleic acid processes that are relevant to gene expression and potential therapeutic strategies. The innovations have helped challenge traditional interpretations of mass spectrometry data and assisted the scientific community's approach to biomolecular analysis.
