= Shannon Turley =

American biologist and immunologist

- Born: Shannon Jennifer Turley
- Education: University of California, San Diego; Yale University
- Awards: Member of the National Academy of Sciences (2025)
- Scientific career
- Workplaces: Genentech; Harvard Medical School; Joslin Diabetes Center; Genentech
- Thesis: Dynamics of the MHC class II pathway in developing dendritic cells (1999)
- Doctoral advisor: Ira Mellman
- Website: www.gene.com/scientists/our-scientists/shannon-turley

Shannon Jennifer Turley is an American biologist who was an Immunology Fellow at Genentech and is now at Amgen. She develops immunotherapies for inflammatory diseases and cancers. She was elected member of the National Academy of Sciences in 2025.

== Early life and education ==
Turley was born and raised in Chicago. She spent a summer at the Shedd Aquarium, where she took part in a research cruise off the Florida Keys. She said that she fell in love with the idea of being a scientist. Her journey into science began at the University of California, San Diego, where she specialized in human biology and completed a placement at Scripps Research working with Jonathan Sprent. Whilst working as a technician at Scripps, Turley published her first paper on mouse ribosomal proteins at the age of 22. She was a doctoral student at Yale University, where she worked on dendritic cells with Ira Mellman.

== Research and career ==
Turley spent a year teaching at Bowdoin College, but despite enjoying teaching, missed basic research. Turley joined the Joslin Diabetes Center for her postdoctoral research. In 2004, Turley was appointed an Assistant Professor of Pathology at the Harvard Medical School. She held a joint position with the Dana–Farber Cancer Institute, where she studied how immune responses were initiated. She was promoted to Associate Professor in 2010, and specialized in stromal immunobiology. She spent ten years at the Dana–Farber Cancer Institute before joining Genentech, having decided to develop immunotherapy that improves patient outcomes. In 2017, she was awarded the Cancer Research Institute Frederick W. Alt Award. Turley has described a new pathway to create tissue-specific tolerance by the presentation of ectopic antigens on lymph node stromal cells.

At Genentech, Turley created a discovery program dedicated to the tumor microenvironment. She is particularly interested in the development of immunotherapies for patients with advanced cancers and inflammatory diseases. Her research has transformed understanding of the cancer-immunity cycle, explaining the sequence through which tumors develop and exploring opportunities to develop targeted therapies. The process begins with the release of cancer cell antigens due to cancer cell death. These antigens are then presented by dendritic cells or other antigen-presenting cells (APCs). This presentation leads to the priming and activation of APCs and T lymphocytes. Cytotoxic T lymphocytes (CTLs) travel to the tumor sites, where they infiltrate the tumours and surrounding stroma. The T lymphocytes then recognize the tumor cells and ultimately kill them through immune cell activity. The immunotypes of different tumors are critical in modulating the T cell response. She has investigated the function of podoplanin in cancer.

=== Selected publications ===
- Sanjeev Mariathasan; Shannon J Turley; Dorothee Nickles; et al. (14 February 2018). "TGFβ attenuates tumour response to PD-L1 blockade by contributing to exclusion of T cells". Nature. 554 (7693): 544–548. doi:10.1038/nature25501. ISSN 1476-4687. PMC 6028240. PMID 29443960. Wikidata Q50001757.
- Mark S Anderson; Emily S Venanzi; Ludger Klein; et al. (15 November 2002). "Projection of an immunological self shadow within the thymus by the aire protein". Science. 298 (5597): 1395–401. doi:10.1126/science.1075958. ISSN 0036-8075. PMID 12376594. Wikidata Q28207164.
- Emmanuel L Gautier; Tal Shay; Jennifer Miller; et al. (30 September 2012). "Gene-expression profiles and transcriptional regulatory pathways that underlie the identity and diversity of mouse tissue macrophages". Nature Immunology. 13 (11): 1118–1128. doi:10.1038/ni.2419. ISSN 1529-2908. PMC 3558276. PMID 23023392. Wikidata Q29620142.

=== Awards and honors ===
Turley was awarded membership of the National Academy of Sciences in 2025.
