= Parker Institute for Cancer Immunotherapy =

American cancer research institute

- Parent institution: Parker Foundation
- Founder: Sean Parker
- Established: April 13, 2016; 10 years ago
- Mission: Accelerate the development of breakthrough immune therapies to turn all cancers into curable diseases.
- Focus: Cancer immunotherapy
- President: Karen E. Knudsen
- Key people: Ira Mellman
- Location: 1 Letterman Drive, Suite D3500, San Francisco, California, United States
- Website: www.parkerici.org

The Parker Institute for Cancer Immunotherapy (PICI) is an American program focused on the acceleration of cancer immunotherapy located in San Francisco. The institute includes over 40 laboratories from several key cancer centers, including Weill Cornell, Stanford Medicine, Gladstone Institute, UCLA, University of Pennsylvania, and the Dana-Farber Cancer Institute.

== History ==
The institute was established in 2016 through the Parker Foundation by a $250 million grant from Sean Parker. Bradley Cooper, John Legend, Orlando Bloom, Katy Perry and Sean Penn were all major initial donors who spoke at the founding gala. The institute was originally focused around three key areas of research, modification of T cells, boosting the patient response to immunotherapy drugs, and research on novel targets. Jeffrey Bluestone was the inaugural president of the institute.

== Structure ==
PICI uses an organizational model to tie funding and science together. The PICI Network includes a number of cancer research centers. The PICI network involves:

- Stanford Medicine
- University of California, Los Angeles
- University of California, San Francisco
- University of Pennsylvania
- Dana-Farber Cancer Institute
- Gladstone Institutes
- Weill Cornell Medicine
