= Bruno Lemaitre =

French immunologist (born 1965)

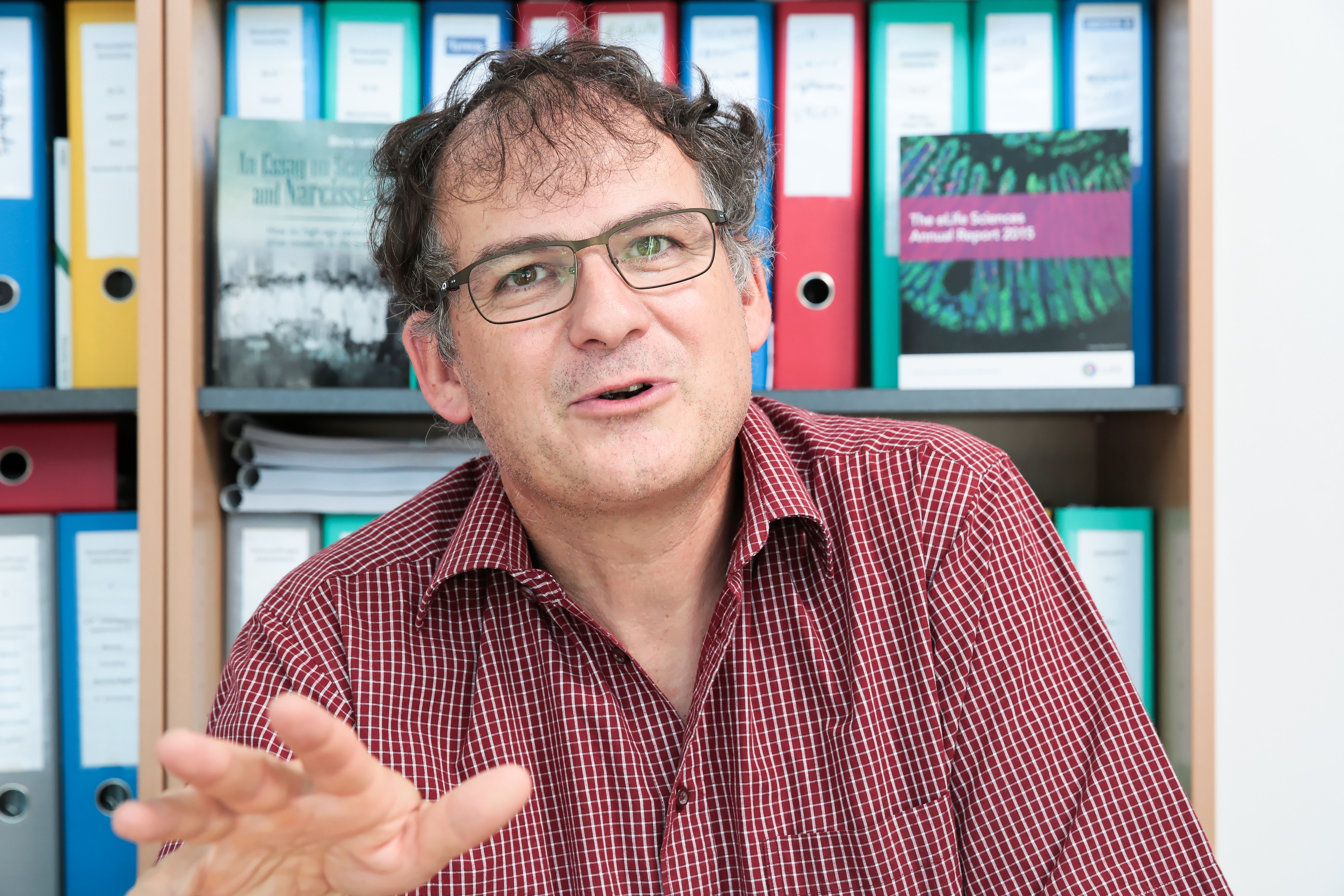
- Lemaitre in 2016
- Born: 21 September 1965 (age 61); Lille, France
- Known for: Role of Toll-like receptors in innate immunity

Academic background
- Education: École Normale Supérieure; Université Pierre-et-Marie-Curie
- Thesis: Regulation of P element transposition in Drosophila (1992)
- Doctoral advisor: Dario Coen

Academic work
- Discipline: Immunology
- Sub-discipline: Innate Immunity
- Institutions: École Polytechnique Fédérale de Lausanne (EPFL)
- Website: www.epfl.ch/labs/lemaitrelab

Bruno Lemaitre (French pronunciation: [bʁyno ləmɛtʁ]; born 21 September 1965) is a French immunologist and a professor at the École Polytechnique Fédérale de Lausanne (EPFL). His research focuses on the mechanisms of innate immunity and endosymbiosis in Drosophila. Lemaitre has also authored several books on the topic of narcissism in science and a book on the philosophy of Michael Polanyi.

== Career ==
Lemaitre obtained a PhD in genetics from the Université Pierre-et-Marie-Curie in 1992, defending a thesis on the regulation of P element transposition in Drosophila. He then pursued work as research associate in the laboratory of Jules Hoffmann, where he identified Toll-like receptors as essential mediators of innate immunity in Drosophila. This work was considered as a landmark paper by the Nobel prize committee and was featured in the 2011 Nobel Prize in Physiology or Medicine awarded to Hoffmann. In 1998, he was appointed group leader at the Molecular Genetics Center of the French National Center for Scientific Research in Gif-sur-Yvette. He moved to EPFL in 2007 as a full professor within the Global Health Institute.

Lemaitre has since 2016 published several books and essays related to the topic of narcissism in science and society. He is co-author of various MOOCs and an exercise book in French on the topic of immunology.

== Research ==
The Lemaitre laboratory studies various aspects of innate immunity using Drosophila as a genetic model. The laboratory uses genetic screens as tools to identify novel factors involved in the immune response following microbial infection. His team has contributed to the better understanding the role of the Toll and NF-κB pathways in the activation of bacterial defence, as well as how the host's immune system discriminates between different bacterial pathogens. Lemaitre also studies host-microbiota interactions, and more specifically how the microbiota influences gut homeostasis and morphology.

Another aspect of interest to Lemaitre is to decipher the roles and mechanisms of the interactions occurring between Drosophila and its endosymbionts of the Spiroplasma genus.

== Distinctions ==
Lemaitre received two Advanced Grants from the European Research Council for projects on gut immunity and homeostasis (2008) and Drosophila-Spiroplasma interactions (2013).

Lemaitre was elected as an EMBO member in 2007.

He received several research prizes, such as the Noury, Thorlet, Lazare Prize from the French Academy of Sciences (2001), the First Prize of the Schlumberger Foundation (2002), the William B. Coley Award for distinguished research in basic and tumor immunology (2003), the Lucien Tartois Prize from the Fondation pour la Recherche Médicale (2006) and the Liliane Bettencourt Prize for Life Sciences (2010).

== See also ==
- Jules A. Hoffmann#Controversy
- Nobel Prize controversies

== Bibliography ==
- Bruno Lemaitre An essay on Science and Narcissism: How do high-ego personalities drive research? (2016. Published by Quanto in 2019)
- Bruno Lemaitre Les dimensions de l'égo (Quanto, 2019) ISBN 2-88915-293-6
- Lemaitre, Bruno (2022). Michael Polanyi : Le scientifique qui voulait réenchanter le monde (in French). Lausanne. ISBN 978-2-88915-502-6. OCLC 1351796396.
- Petrignani, Bianca; Clavarino, Giovanna; Lemaitre, Bruno (24 September 2020). Immunologie exercices: QCM, questions de cours et problèmes résolus. EPFL Press. ISBN 978-2-88915-361-9.
