= Cancer Cytopathology =

- Discipline: Pathology, Oncology
- Language: English
- Edited by: William C. Faquin

Publication details
- History: 1997–present
- Publisher: Wiley-Blackwell for the American Cancer Society (United States)
- Frequency: Monthly
- Open access: Hybrid
- Impact factor: 5.284 (2020)

Standard abbreviations
- ISO 4: Cancer Cytopathol.

Indexing
- ISSN: 1934-6638

Links
- Journal homepage; Online access; Online archive

Cancer Cytopathology is a monthly peer-reviewed scientific journal which covers practice of cytopathology and its related oncology-based disciplines. It is one of three official journals of the American Cancer Society and is published by Wiley-Blackwell on behalf of the society. The current editor-in-chief is William C. Faquin. Cancer Cytopathology was published as a section of Cancer from 1997 until 2008 when it was split into a separate journal.

== Abstracting and indexing ==
The journal is abstracted and indexed in:

- Academic OneFile
- Academic Search
- Biological Abstracts
- BIOSIS Previews
- CAB Abstracts
- Chemical Abstracts
- CINAHL
- Current Contents/Clinical Medicine
- Current Contents/Life Sciences
- Current Index to Statistics
- Elsevier BIOBASE
- Embase
- Global Health
- Index Medicus/MEDLINE/PubMed
- International Bibliography of Periodical Literature
- PASCAL
- PsycINFO
- Science Citation Index
- Scopus
- Sociedad Iberoamericana de Informacion Cientifica (SIIC) databases
- Tropical Diseases Bulletin

According to the Journal Citation Reports, the journal has a 2020 impact factor of 5.284, ranking it 16th out of 77 journals in the category "Pathology" and 83rd out of 242 journals in "Oncology".
