= Liliane Bettencourt Prize for Life Sciences =

- Country: France
- Reward: €100,000 (since 2023)
- First award: 1997
- Website: www.fondationbs.org

The Liliane Bettencourt Prize for Life Sciences (French: Prix Liliane Bettencourt pour les sciences du vivant) is an annual scientific award given by the Fondation Bettencourt Schueller. Founded by French heiress and businesswoman Liliane Bettencourt, together with her husband and daughter, the foundation established the prize to recognise outstanding contributions to life sciences research by early-career scientists in Europe. It was established in 1997 to honour notable achievements in biology and biomedical research and to support leading researchers at a pivotal stage of their scientific careers. The prize focuses on researchers under the age of 45 whose work has had significant scientific impact and who are recognised by the international scientific community for the significance and originality of their research.

The Prize is awarded each year either to a researcher based in France or to one elsewhere in Europe, supporting both French biomedical research and the broader European scientific community. Since 2023, the awardee receives a personal endowment of €100,000.

== History ==
The Liliane Bettencourt Prize for Life Sciences was created in 1997 by the Fondation Bettencourt Schueller as part of its broader commitment to supporting excellence in scientific research, particularly in the life sciences. The Foundation itself was established in 1987 with the aim of promoting research, innovation, and scientific discovery for the common good, especially in biomedicine and health. The prize was initiated to recognise researchers whose groundbreaking work contributes significantly to fundamental biology or biomedical science. Since its inception, the award has been presented every year to European researchers who meet its eligibility criteria.

Over time, the Prize has become an established component of the Fondation Bettencourt Schueller's life-sciences programmes, alongside initiatives such as Impulscience and ATIP-Avenir. Originally endowed with larger sums, the prize's monetary value has evolved over time, and since 2023 it is set at €100,000 personally for the laureate.

== Criteria and selection process ==
Eligibility for the Prize is defined by several criteria set by the Foundation's scientific committee: the award is open to researchers working in the life sciences who hold citizenship of a European Union (EU) or European Free Trade Association (EFTA) country, are under the age of 45 (with allowances for career interruptions), and are affiliated with a laboratory in the EU or EFTA. The age criterion is assessed as of January 1 of the award year. The prize alternates annually between researchers working in France and researchers working in other European countries.

The selection process is conducted by an independent scientific committee composed of leading French and international scientists. Candidates are nominated by their peers or invited to apply, after which a stringent evaluation of scientific merit, publication record, and research impact is carried out before the final decision is made. The nature of the award is strictly a personal research prize intended to support and recognise the individual achievements of a scientist rather than to fund a specific project or institution, although it implicitly enables further research activities.

== Notable laureates ==
- 2010 – Bruno Lemaitre: Recognised for his research on innate immunity using Drosophila melanogaster as a model organism, particularly in elucidating Toll and Imd pathways in antimicrobial defence.
- 2020 – Salvador Aznar-Benitah: Awarded for his work at IRB Barcelona on stem cell biology and the mechanisms linking dietary fats to cancer and ageing; his research sheds light on metastasis and potential therapeutic strategies.
- 2023 – Raphaël Rodriguez: Recognised for designing small molecules to dissect cellular processes related to cancer, inflammation, and ageing, providing insights into metal-regulated cell states and therapeutic targets.
- 2024 – Andrea Ablasser: Awarded for her contributions to understanding innate immunity at the molecular level, reflecting excellence in immunobiology research (awarded in conjunction with the 2024 scientific prize ceremony).
- 2025 – Abdou Rachid Thiam: Recognised for interdisciplinary research applying physics to cell biology, particularly lipid droplets and organelle function, illuminating mechanisms with implications for metabolic disease.

== Impact and significance ==
The Liliane Bettencourt Prize for Life Sciences functions primarily as a form of early-career recognition within the Fondation Bettencourt Schueller's broader support framework for biological and biomedical research. By highlighting individual researchers under the age of 45, the Prize contributes to the visibility of emerging scientific leaders across Europe and reflects the Foundation's emphasis on fundamental research in the life sciences. The award complements other European and international research prizes by focusing on individual scientific trajectories rather than lifetime achievement or large-scale project funding.
