= Leon E. Rosenberg =

American geneticist (1933–2022)

Leon Emanuel Rosenberg
- Born: March 3, 1933; Madison, Wisconsin, U.S.
- Died: July 22, 2022 (aged 89)
- Education: University of Wisconsin (B.A., M.D.)
- Spouses: Elaine Lewis (m. 1954; div. 1972) Diane Drobnis (m. 1979)
- Awards: Received Guggenheim Fellowship
- Scientific career
- Workplaces: Princeton University, Bristol-Myers Squibb, Yale University
- Website: molbio.princeton.edu/people/leon-rosenberg

Leon Emanuel Rosenberg (March 3, 1933 – July 22, 2022) was an American physician-scientist, geneticist, and educator. He served as chair of the department of human genetics and also as dean of the medical school of Yale University. He then worked as the chief scientific officer of the Bristol-Myers Squibb Pharmaceutical company. He wrote more than 300 research articles, chapters, and books on his scientific research and public policy views across his career.

== Education ==
Rosenberg graduated from Madison West High School in 1950, and received his Bachelor of Arts degree from the University of Wisconsin in Madison in 1954 followed by his Doctor of Medicine degree from the same university in 1957. He worked as a clinical associate at the National Cancer Institute (NCI) from 1959 to 1962 and as a senior investigator at the NCI from 1963 to 1965.

== Research and career ==
He started his professional career at the Yale University School of Medicine in 1965 as an assistant professor of medicine, was promoted to chair of human genetics in 1972 and later to the position of dean of the Yale School of Medicine, a post he held from 1984 to 1991. Subsequently, he served as the chief scientific officer (CSO) of the Bristol-Myers Squibb (BMS) Pharmaceutical Company from 1991 to 1998. Thereafter, he spent 16 years at Princeton University as a lecturer at the rank of professor in the Department of Molecular Biology and in the Woodrow Wilson School of Public and International Affairs. Before retiring in 2018, he worked as an upper school science teacher and scientist in residence at the Princeton Day School.

Rosenberg carried out his research on human inherited disorders of amino acid and organic acid metabolism briefly at NCI and for 26 years at Yale University. He discovered new inherited disorders of organic acid metabolism (propionic and methylmalonic acidemia), and defined key aspects of ornithine transcarbamylase deficiency leading to ammonia intoxication, including its mode of inheritance and mechanism of the enzyme's transport to mitochondria. He discovered several inherited defects in vitamin B_{12} metabolism in children and showed that they could be treated successfully with large supplements of the vitamin.

== Awards and honors ==
In 1976, Rosenberg was elected to membership in the American Academy of Arts and Sciences (AAAS). Additional memberships include the National Academy of Medicine (NAM), and the National Academy of Sciences (NAS). He received honorary degrees from the University of Wisconsin and the Mount Sinai School of Medicine. In 2003, he received the Kober medal from the Association of American Physicians. In 2011, he received the McKusick Award from the American Society of Human Genetics.

== Personal life ==
Rosenberg married Elaine Lewis in 1954. They had three children (Robert, Diana, and David) before divorcing in 1972. In 1979, he married Diane Drobnis, a senior editor in medical publishing. They had a daughter named Alexa. Rosenberg died at the age of 89 on 22 July 2022.

== Selected publications ==
- DNA and Other Strands: The Making of a Human Geneticist". Annual Reviews of Genetics and Genomics (2013).
- A Gender Gap in the Next Generation of Physician-Scientists: Medical Student Interest and Participation in Research. Journal of Investigative Medicine (2001).
- Building bridges between academia and industry: forms, foundations, functions. Yale Journal of Biology and Medicine (1997).
- Treating Genetic Diseases: Lessons from Three Children. Journal of Pediatric Research (1990).
- The Physician-Scientist: An Essential—and Fragile—Link in the Medical Research Chain. Journal of Clinical Investigation (1999).
