= Programme of Action for Cancer Therapy =

Organization

Programme of Action for Cancer Therapy (PACT) is an Austrian programme created by the International Atomic Energy Agency (IAEA) to expand cancer care capacities.

== History and operations ==
In 2004, the IAEA created PACT in Vienna, Austria. The programme was intended to expand the Agency's experience in radiation medicine and technology. Additionally, the programme aimed to enable developing countries to introduce, expand or improve their cancer care capacity and services in a sustainable manner by integrating radiotherapy into a comprehensive cancer control programme that maximizes its therapeutic effectiveness and impact. Such a programme integrates and aligns cancer prevention, surveillance, screening and early detection, treatment and palliative care activities and investments, and is set up based on the Guidelines of the World Health Organization (WHO).

PACT also addresses infrastructure gaps and, through partnerships, builds capacity and long-term support for continuous education and training of cancer care professionals, as well as for community-based civil society action to combat cancer.

== Partnerships ==
PACT and its partners are developing multidisciplinary cancer capacity building projects called PACT Model Demonstration Sites (PMDS). As of 2010, there are eight PMDS: Albania, Ghana, Mongolia, Nicaragua, Sri Lanka, United Republic of Tanzania, Vietnam and the Republic of Yemen.

== See also ==
- Cancer
- International Atomic Energy Agency (IAEA)
- Oncology
- Radiation therapy
