= Molecular Cancer Research =

- Discipline: Oncology
- Language: English

Publication details
- Former name(s): Cell Growth & Differentiation
- Publisher: American Association for Cancer Research (United States)
- Frequency: Monthly

Standard abbreviations
- ISO 4: Mol. Cancer Res.

Indexing
- ISSN: 1541-7786 (print); 1557-3125 (web)

Links
- Journal homepage

Molecular Cancer Research is a monthly peer reviewed academic journal published by the American Association for Cancer Research.

Prior to September 2002 it was known as Cell Growth & Differentiation.
