= Ralph M. Steinman =

Canadian immunologist and cell biologist

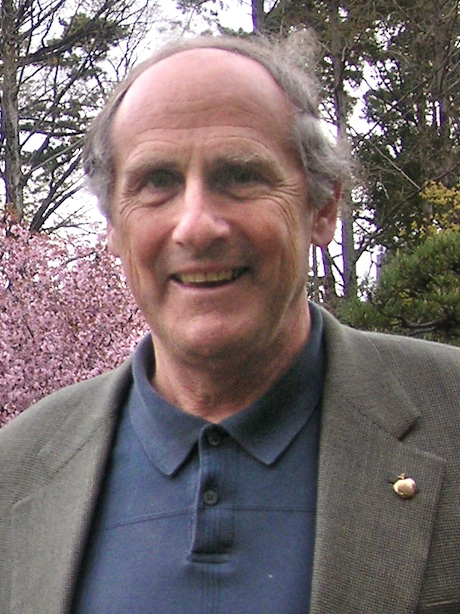
- Born: Ralph Marvin Steinman; January 14, 1943; Montreal, Quebec, Canada
- Died: September 30, 2011 (aged 68); Manhattan, New York, U.S.
- Education: McGill University (B.S., 1963); Harvard University (M.D., 1968)
- Known for: Discovery of dendritic cells and their role in adaptive immunity
- Spouse: Claudia Hoeffel (3 children)
- Awards: Robert Koch Prize (1999); Gairdner Foundation International Award (2003); Nobel Prize in Physiology or Medicine (2011)
- Scientific career
- Fields: Immunology; Cell Biology
- Workplaces: Rockefeller University in New York City
- Academic advisors: Elizabeth Hay (Harvard); James G. Hirsch and Zanvil A. Cohn (Rockefeller University)

Ralph Marvin Steinman (January 14, 1943 – September 30, 2011) was a Canadian physician and medical researcher at Rockefeller University, who in 1973 discovered and named dendritic cells while working as a postdoctoral fellow in the laboratory of Zanvil A. Cohn, also at Rockefeller University. Steinman was one of the recipients of the 2011 Nobel Prize in Physiology or Medicine.

== Early life and education ==
Ralph Steinman was born into an Ashkenazi Jewish family in Montreal, one of four children of Irving Steinman (d. 1995), a haberdasher, and Nettie Steinman (born Takefman, 1917–2016). The family soon moved to Sherbrooke, where the father opened and ran a small clothing store, "Mozart's." After graduating from Sherbrooke High School, Steinman moved back to Montreal, where he stayed with his maternal grandparents, Nathan and Eva Takefman. He received a bachelor of science degree from McGill University and received his M.D. (magna cum laude) in 1968 from Harvard Medical School. He completed his internship and residency at Massachusetts General Hospital.

== Awards ==
On October 3, 2011, the Nobel Committee for Physiology or Medicine announced that he had received one half of the Nobel Prize in Physiology or Medicine, for "his discovery of the dendritic cell and its role in adaptive immunity". The other half went to Bruce Beutler and Jules A. Hoffmann, for "their discoveries concerning the activation of innate immunity". However, the committee was not aware that he had died three days earlier, on September 30, from pancreatic cancer. This created a complication, since the statutes of the Nobel Foundation stipulate that the prize is not to be awarded posthumously. After deliberation, the committee decided that as the decision to award the prize "was made in good faith", it would remain unchanged, and the prize would be awarded.

Steinman's daughter said that he had joked the previous week with his family about staying alive until the prize announcement. Steinman said: "I know I have got to hold out for that. They don't give it to you if you have passed away. I got to hold out for that."

Steinman had received numerous other awards and recognitions for his lifelong work on dendritic cells, such as the Albert Lasker Award For Basic Medical Research (2007), the Gairdner Foundation International Award (2003), and the Cancer Research Institute William B. Coley Award (1998). In addition, he was made a member of Institute of Medicine (U.S.; elected 2002) and the National Academy of Sciences (U.S.; elected 2001).

In 2016, the city of Sherbrooke, Quebec, where Steinman lived during his childhood, named a new street rue Ralph Steinman, in honour of the only Sherbrooke native ever to win a Nobel Prize.

=== List of awards ===
- 1998 – William B. Coley Award
- 1999 – Robert Koch Prize
- 2003 – Gairdner Foundation International Award
- 2006 – Debrecen Award for Molecular Medicine
- 2007 – Albert Lasker Award for Basic Medical Research
- 2009 – Albany Medical Center Prize (Shared with Charles A. Dinarello and Bruce Beutler; )
- 2010 – Heineken Prizes
- 2011 – Nobel Prize in Physiology or Medicine (shared with Bruce Beutler and Jules A. Hoffmann)

== Research ==
Immunology tries to understand resistance to infection. Infections are first resisted by innate immunity, followed by adaptive immunity, which has memory and can prevent reinfection. Two questions that immunologists ask: 1) By what mechanisms do innate and adaptive resistance come about? 2) How do these mechanisms contribute to other fields of medicine such as cancer, allergy, autoimmunity, etc.? In the 20th century, two theories arose: 1) Macrophages contribute to innate resistance through phagocytosis and intracellular killing 2) Antibodies mediate adaptive resistance by neutralizing microbial toxins.

Steinman discovered that dendritic cells link innate to adaptive immunity, including adaptive T cell-mediated immunity. He studied the initiation of antibody responses in tissue culture in the laboratory. Steinman found that antigens, lymphocytes, and "accessory cells" together create immune responses. Accessory cells contain a new cell type with probing cell process or "dendrites". These cells proved to be the missing link between innate and adaptive immunity.

Several features were used to identify and purify dendritic cells from mouse spleen. Because dendritic cells were discovered among "adherent" accessory cells (i.e. those that attach to tissue culture surfaces), they had to be distinguished from macrophages, whose hallmarks were persistent phagocytosis and adherence to tissue culture surfaces. However, Steinman found that dendritic cells had a different morphology and expressed different molecules from macrophages. For example, they did not express FcR- receptors, but did express major components of the major histocompatibility complex II and did not adhere to surfaces or exploit phagocytosis. Macrophages, though, showed the opposite characteristics. The study was carried out in collaboration with Zanvil A. Cohn, who studied resistance to infectious diseases, especially the biology of macrophages.

Some general features of T cell responses that are initiated by dendritic cells (DCs):

- Adaptive immunity develops in two stages: DCs present antigens and initiate the afferent limb, while the other antigen-presenting cells (APCs) mediate the effectors to eliminate the antigen or infection.
- In tissue cultures, immunity develops in clusters of DCs and lymphocytes. The onset of adaptive immunity could actually be observed in vitro.
- DCs were therefore considered "nature's adjuvants" for T cell immunity, meaning they helped induce T cells.
- DCs can produce protective substances such as cytokines, interferons, chemokines, and antimicrobial peptides.
- DCs can mobilize innate lymphocytes such as natural killer cells (which in turn produce cytokines or kill target cells upon recognition). However, unlike macrophages, DCs do not phagocytose or kill microbes.

DCs capture, process and present antigens:

- Some receptors such as FcR death receptor can activate or inhibit DC function.
- Antigen processing and presentation of proteins and lipids seems efficient and can include cross presentation on MHC I and CD1.
- Uptake and processing are regulated by environmental stimuli.
- In vivo, dendritic cells process antigens to form peptide-MHC complexes in the steady state, especially in lymphoid organs.
- Most DCs in vivo in the steady state are immature, able to take up and present antigens, but areunable to adaptive T cell immunity.
- Environmental stimuli, e.g., microbial products, alter or mature DCs and/or act together with DCs to control the formation of different types of helper, cytotoxic, and regulatory types of T cells.
- Maturing DCs also carry out innate responses, particularly the formation of cytokines and chemokines.
- Maturation links are innate to adaptive immunity; and control the quality of the response that develops in DCs and lymphocytes that recognize presented antigens.
- The term "subset" refers to distinct DCs with different receptors for antigen uptake and maturation, and distinct functions in innate and adaptive immunity. They reside in the peripheral organs and induce different forms of antigen-specific peripheral tolerance. Antigens from the periphery are captured by DCs in lymphoid tissues, even in steady (not matured) state. In steady state, DCs induce tolerance so that DC maturation can lead to immunity to microbial antigen, but maturing DCs capture microbial, as well as self dying cells, thus resulting in autoreactivity and chronic inflammation.

== See also ==
- List of Jewish Nobel laureates
