= Zanvil A. Cohn =

American physician (1926–1993)

- Born: November 16 1926; New York City, New York, United States
- Died: June 28 1993 (aged 66)
- Occupation: Physician
- Medical career
- Institutions: Rockefeller University
- Sub-specialties: Immunology, cellular biology

Zanvil Alexander Cohn (November 16, 1926 – June 28, 1993) was a cell biologist and immunologist who upon his death was described by The New York Times as being "in the forefront of current studies of the body's defenses against infection.", professor at Rockefeller University. There Cohn had been the Henry G. Kunkel Professor for seven years. Cohn was senior physician at the university as well as vice president for medical affairs. Until two years before his death, he also served as principal investigator of the Irvington Institute for Medical Research. Although Cohn never won the Nobel Prize, Ralph M. Steinman, with whom he ran a laboratory at Rockefeller University for many years, was named to win the 2011 Nobel Prize in Physiology or Medicine for the work on dendritic cells done in their lab, eighteen years after Cohn's death.

By way of explaining Cohn's importance, one commentator has noted that macrophages "are scavenger cells of the immune system that engulf and digest invaders, including bacteria and other pathogens, as well as toxins and dead cells. They are central to so-called innate immunity—immune defenses that can act without previous exposure to a pathogen. They are central to inflammation, the responses of the body to infection and injury, and also when inflammation becomes chronic during diseases like atherosclerosis and tuberculosis. When Zanvil Cohn (1926-1993) began studying macrophages in the early 1960s, little was known about them. Immunologists had for decades focused on the chemistry of the second major component of the immune system—the acquired immune response, in which the body produces antibodies in response to exposure to an antigen. In pioneering studies, both at the laboratory bench and with human subjects, Cohn helped launch the new field of cellular immunology."

"Dr. Cohn's experiments," reported the Times in his obituary, "threw light on the functions of T-cells, made in the bone marrow, and macrophages, large cells that can surround and digest foreign substances like protozoa and bacteria. He applied these insights to patient-oriented investigations of leprosy, tuberculosis and AIDS. He also established that macrophages can release a multitude of biologically active products. Since the mid-1980s he used hormone-like products of the immune system to increase patients' resistance to microbial infections. This work took him to parts of Asia and Latin America where leprosy and tuberculosis are endemic."

In a 2009 biographical memoir, Carol L. Moberg and Steinman wrote that "Zanvil Cohn may be most remembered as the founder of modern macrophage biology and for leading the shift in mid-twentieth-century research from bacterial cells to host-parasite relationships."

== Early life and pre-war education ==
Cohn was born in New York City, the son of David and Esther (Schwartz) Cohn; he had one sibling, a brother, Donald, who was three years younger. Zanvil, a Yiddish version of Samuel, was a family name. His father had come to New York from Düsseldorf at age 19 in 1905 and after working for some years in his uncle Josef's butcher shop in Manhattan became an owner of Kansas Packing, a meat packing firm in New York. Cohn's mother, born in the United States of parents from Budapest, was raised in Huntington, Long Island, and worked as a buyer for Oppenheim, Collins & Co., a Manhattan clothing store, later becoming a partner in an apparel firm. As a child, Cohn spoke both German and English. He attended public schools in Queens, then Columbia Grammar School in Manhattan, where he played baseball and football, was president of the student government, and played piano at graduation. After graduating from Columbia Grammar at 16, Cohn attended Bates College in Maine, where he majored in biology. He was the first member of his family to attend college.

== World War II ==
During World War II, Cohn joined the U.S. Merchant Marine, became a hospital corpsman, and served from 1944 to 1946 "as purser-pharmacist on Liberty ships in the Atlantic and Pacific," where he was sometimes "the only medically trained person among the ship's crew and 1,500 soldiers, with responsibility for preventing epidemics, administering vaccines and antibiotics, and treating wounds."

== Post-war education ==
Returning to Bates after the war, Cohn met Fern Dworkin in 1946 in an organic chemistry class. After graduating in June 1948, they married in December of the same year. Unable to gain entrance into Harvard Medical School, he entered Harvard's graduate program in bacteriology in the Department of Microbiology, where he did so well that he was able to enter Harvard Medical School a year later. It was while he was a medical student there that he published his first scientific paper, based on work begun in the Department of Microbiology. He received his M.D. degree in 1953 and was one of an extremely small number of students in that medical school's history to be awarded an M.D. summa cum laude. His thesis concerned host-parasite relationships, which would be the focus of his career.

No one in Cohn's family had a medical or academic background. Moberg and Steinman say that he was motivated by Paul de Kruif's book Microbe Hunters and by Sinclair Lewis's novel Arrowsmith, as well as by his experiences with penicillin on the Liberty ships, to become a doctor and medical researcher. They also suggest that his interest in medicine, and particularly in the study of infectious diseases, might be traced back to a childhood "brush with death from scarlet fever that quarantined the whole family" and/or to his experiences with "the caring family physician who looked after his father, bedridden nearly a year following a severe bout of pneumonia." (Cohn's father died at 57 while Cohn was in high school.) A 1983 profile of Cohn indicated that "While he was still in medical school, his interest in research had been spurred by a series of technological advances that were dramatically expanding the scope of cell biology. His interest in Rockefeller stemmed from the fact that many of the advances, in electron microscopy, cell fractionation, and immunology, were happening there."

== Career ==
Cohn performed his internship and residency at Massachusetts General Hospital, then entered the Army Medical Corps as a captain, working in the laboratory of virologist Joseph Smadel at the Walter Reed Army Institute of Research. For two years Cohn "explored respiratory enzymes and the cell wall of the intracellular parasite Rickettsia tsutsugamushi."

=== Rockefeller Institute for Medical Research ===
In October 1957 Cohn was appointed assistant physician and research associate at the Rockefeller Hospital and what was then called the Rockefeller Institute for Medical Research (later Rockefeller University) in New York, where he worked in the laboratory of René Dubos, whose 1954 monograph Biochemical Determinants of Microbial Diseases he considered "visionary and provocative" and "always kept within reach." Dubos's studies in microbiology had played a key role in the development of antibiotics. Yet there was little understanding of how these "wonder drugs" worked. Cohn's first project in Dubos' lab, which he conducted with Steven Morse, was to confirm that it is polymorph leukocytes that kill the bacteria that cause staph infections.

Moberg and Steinman describe the situation in the Dubos Laboratory of Bacteriology and Pathology, as follows: "Dubos fostered investigators, not mere problem solvers, thus allowing newcomers independence to plan experiments and progress at their own pace. As [Cohn] said in a 1983 interview, Dubos had a habit of talking to newcomers 'for the first two days, and if he thought they could get along on their own he would not talk to them again for another year. I was terribly upset, I must say.'" Cohn worked at Rockefeller for the next 35 years, "most of them on the fourth floor of Bronk Laboratory."

When Cohn began working under Dubos, as Moberg and Steinman explain, "the study of leukocytes was still in its infancy....It was also the time when the new science of cell biology was emerging at Rockefeller....This was making it possible to explore the world inside cells: electron microscopy for showing cell structures never before observed and centrifugation methods for separating and analyzing cellular constituents." Cohn and his colleague James G. Hirsch "used these new tools to address the question of whether phagocytes contained preformed bactericidal substances or whether these substances developed after foreign particles were engulfed. They isolated granules from the rest of the cell contents, used phase and electron microscopy to visualize them, and determined chemically that they were lysosomes, the cell organelles recently identified by Belgian biochemist Christian de Duve. These discoveries, which traced the phagocytic digestive system to the fusion of phagocytic vacuoles and lysosomes, became widely available to the community after Jim and Zan made a remarkable series of films showing living phagocytes discharging their abundant lysosomes to kill bacteria."

In 1966 Cohn was made full professor at Rockefeller, which had just changed its name from the Rockefeller Institute for Medical Research to the Rockefeller University, and, with Hirsch, formed a Laboratory of Cellular Physiology and Immunology. There they explored macrophages, about which little was known. Cohn's "adroit tissue culturing of macrophages made it possible to observe, challenge, and manipulate them to figure out how they worked." He showed how "the cell's outer membrane folds around the captured material, forms a sac or vacuole that is pinched off from the cell surface and enclosed within the cell, and fuses with the lysosome where the contents are then digested." The result, as Moberg and Steinman put it, was the transformation of endocytosis into "a central field of cell biology, because it is pertinent to all cells for extracting from their surrounding environment the nutrients needed for survival as well as for capturing and destroying toxins and pathogens." A Rockefeller University source puts it this way: "Cohn's discoveries on endocytosis in macrophages have proved fundamental to cell biology, since endocytosis is a process universal to all cells, and is the mechanism by which cells digest materials from their surroundings, ranging from microbes to proteins carrying nutrients."

Cohn's team discovered other key functions of macrophages, moving beyond endocytosis to study macrophages' secretions and identifying more than 50 products of macrophages that play "active roles in inflammation and immunity." The team found that "activated macrophages release active oxygen intermediates, such as superoxide and hydrogen peroxide, to destroy bacteria and tumor cells. A further demonstration that macrophages could be activated by lymphokines in vivo was important in the laboratory's subsequent clinical efforts to treat diseases in which macrophages achieve both intracellular and extracellular killing." Cohn called macrophages the "versatile element of inflammation," with some of their secretions resulting in the healing of wounds, the repair of tissues, or the destruction of microbes and tumors, while excessive amounts of secretions from overstimulated microphages can intensify various diseases, including rheumatoid arthritis and atherosclerosis.

An interview with Cohn described the discovery of the secretory role of macrophages as follows: "A major immunological finding, which has come primarily from work in Dr. Cohn's laboratory, is that macrophages are not just eaters. In addition to the chemicals they make to kill and degrade the cells they ingest, they also secrete many molecules into their surrounding environment, affecting the activity of other cells. 'This is an important part of the inflammatory process, which may lead either to wound healing and tissue repair or to destruction of tissues,' says Dr. Cohn. 'Among the secreted chemicals are those that stimulate the formation of blood cells and blood vessels; pyrogens, the fever-producing substances; and enzymes involved in lipoprotein metabolism. A delicate balance exists in the amount and nature of the secretory products. When present in excessive amounts disease states such as rheumatoid arthritis, glomerulonephritis, and even atherosclerosis may be potentiated.'"

Looking into the genesis of macrophages, Cohn and his colleague Ralph van Furth "used a radiolabeled isotope to label blood monocytes and trace their production and development. They identified the blood monocyte as the precursor for tissue macrophages and the bone marrow as the source of monocytes." At the same time, electron microscope studies he performed with Hirsch and Martha Fedorko provided further insight into macrophage formation and differentiation. This work, according to Moberg and Steinman, "illuminated a pivotal pathway to host defense and captivated the minds and spirits of innumerable scientists," resulting in five international conferences on mononuclear phagocytes held at Leiden between 1969 and 1991.

Ralph Steinman joined the Cohn-Hirsch laboratory in 1970, and eventually it became the Cohn-Steinman laboratory. In 1973, in the course of studying macrophages, Steinman and Cohn discovered "an entirely distinct class of immune cells" which differed "in structure, appearance, and function from macrophages" and which would come to be recognized as "powerful initiators of the immune response and major controllers of both innate and adaptive immunity." As one source puts it, this cell, which Steinman named the dendritic cell, would later be found "to be the sentinel cells of the immune system."

In the early 1980s, wanting to discover "why in certain diseases the macrophages, after ingesting pathogens, not only fail to kill them but instead provide a hospitable environment for them to thrive, multiply, and reactivate disease," and thus develop therapies, Cohn and other members of his team began visiting hospitals in Brazil, and later in Colombia, Ethiopia, India, Nepal, and the Philippines, to study patients with leprosy and various other diseases, including tuberculosis and AIDS. "For some reason," Cohn said in a 1983 interview, "no one had ever really looked very hard at the local skin lesions of leprosy patients. Diagnosis has usually been based on analysis of cells in the blood stream. So when we first went to Brazil, we decided that we would examine the cells in the skin. In the virulent lepromatous lesions we found bacteria-filled macrophages together with a large number of suppressor T cells. As we studied patients in the intermediate stages of the disease and on to the tuberculoid form, we found that the number of so-called helper cells began to increase relative to the number of suppressor T cells."

This, Cohn said, suggested "that the suppressor cells produce a factor which, in effect, turns off the macrophage. Or else, the macrophages don't work because of the absence of helper cells. The question is, Can you suppress the suppressors or help the helpers? Some experiments we've been doing in the lab with cells of other diseases indicate that either or both may be possible, but we need to know a lot more about the bacteria and the immune cells before we can manipulate them clinically....What we can learn about these suppressor cells...is also of great interest because there's a fair amount of evidence in many animal models that suppressor cells modify the ability of a host to fight off tumors, and that if you can destroy the suppressor cells, you'll allow normal body defenses to come back and destroy the tumor."

The examination of T cells in leprosy patients led Cohn and his team to develop treatments that "restored some of the patients' immune function at both the local and systemic level, although they did not cure the disease." Cohn developed "high expectations that lymphokines and other agents interacting with macrophages would someday enter the physician's armamentarium to fight disease." At the time of his death, Cohn was arranging "an expanded program to enhance the immune system of immune-compromised individuals with AIDS and tuberculosis."

Cohn was appointed Rockefeller University's vice president for medical affairs by President Torsten Wiesel in 1992. During the last seven years of his life, Cohn was also the Henry G. Kunkel Professor at the university. In addition, he held the title of senior physician at Rockefeller University Hospital. For a long period, ending only two years before his death, moreover, he was principal investigator at the Irvington Institute for Medical Research.

== Other professional activities ==
In 1977, Cohn was one of nine Rockefeller University professors to visit the People's Republic of China as part of one of the earliest U.S.-China cooperate ventures in science and culture following the death of Mao and the end of the Cultural Revolution. In 1988 he spent a sabbatical at the Dunn School at Oxford University.

In 1972, Cohn, along with Hirsch and Alexander Gordon Bearn, organized at Cornell University Medical College "one of the first medical scientist training programs for the combined M.D.-Ph.D. degree." Cohn also "fostered interactions of young people with physicians at Rockefeller, Weill Cornell Medical College, and Memorial Sloan-Kettering Cancer Center, the three biomedical research and educational institutions across the street from one another," establishing "the Tri-Institutional Biomedical Forum, an informal sherry-and-lecture series reminiscent of his happy 1988 sabbatical at the Dunn School in Oxford, where young scientists could get to know their counterparts at these three institutions." He also brought new life to the Clinical Scholars program, which trained new doctors "to care for patients on a daily basis while conducting bench research to better understand their diseases."

In 1989 he paid tribute to Dubos on the 50th anniversary of Dubos's discovery of the antibiotic gramicidin by organizing a symposium on "Launching the Antibiotic Era." At the event, he spoke of the importance of "supporting young investigators and global research, the opportunities afforded single investigators working in small laboratories, the efficacy of personal involvement at the bedside, and a moral climate that led to patents for the general good."

Cohn was on the editorial boards of several journals, and served for twenty years as editor-in-chief of the Journal of Experimental Medicine. "Following in the footsteps of retiring editor René Dubos," recalls Moberg and Steinman, Cohn "insisted its pages provide sufficient space to document conclusions adequately and to pursue mechanisms in detail; he looked for papers with novelty, clarity, and a mechanistic analysis that was quantitative, direct, and multifaceted." He also served as an "adviser to several institutions of biomedical research." Over the course of his career, furthermore, Cohn served as "adviser or trustee of Harvard University, Massachusetts General Hospital, Max Planck Institute, Trudeau Institute, Roswell Park Memorial Institute, the National Institute of Allergy and Infectious Diseases, the New York Blood Center, and Bates College."

== Honors and awards ==
Cohn was elected to the National Academy of Sciences in 1975, was appointed to Rockefeller's first Henry G. Kunkel Professorship in 1986, and received honorary degrees from Bates College (1987), Oxford University (1988), and Rijksuniversiteit in Leiden (1990).

== Personal attributes and professional conduct ==
Cohn was known to friends and colleagues as "Zan." "With an imposing stature and warm demeanor," write Moberg and Steinman, Cohn "exuded an air of equanimity and quiet authority." At his memorial service, Rockefeller University President Torsten Wiesel described him as "a prince of a man who inspired everyone fortunate enough to have known him. He was an eminent scientist, a caring physician, and a great human being guided by a clear philosophical stance." Moberg and Steinman also suggest that Cohn's "talents were distinctive in cell biology and unusual in cellular immunology at the time, because they included an ability to quantify and identify biochemical mechanisms and to obtain images of subcellular behavior." In addition, they note that Cohn "was known for keeping his focus on important scientific questions and looking for major changes. His philosophy, influenced by Dubos, was that if you need statistics to know the data are significant, then you are probably not looking at a major event."

A Rockefeller University source noted that Cohn's "support of young scientists is reflected in the large number of them in his laboratory and in his stewardship, for many years, of the University's joint MD.-Ph.D. program with Cornell University Medical College, which also reflects his commitment to clinical medicine." Steinman told the New York Times after Cohn's death that "I think his greatest pleasure was to nurture the development of students and young faculty, many of whom now occupy professorial positions." Calling him a "demanding yet inspiring mentor," Moberg and Steinman write that Cohn "took great pleasure in nurturing graduate students and postdoctoral fellows," adding that he "never imposed any model or edict that might detract from a person's individuality or creativity. There was always a quiet but profound sense of mutual respect in his interactions with everyone. He kept an open door and an open mind. Brief in his discourses, he got to the heart of the matter in a few words, exercising an impressive memory and analytical skills. Gentle, but firm and self-assured, he defined and organized complex research problems into simple, intelligible terms that were rooted in practicality of execution."

Cohn also placed great importance on "writing and speaking clearly and succinctly. Part of his mentoring of graduate students involved going over their first papers, discussing every sentence, removing most punctuation, and smoothing rough data into seamless, well-reasoned arguments." When preparing his own scientific papers, reviews, and lectures, of which he wrote hundreds, Cohn "first thought long and hard about the topic, saying his best thinking was done while commuting by car from home on Long Island or on his fishing boat. Then he sat down with sharpened pencils and a yellow lined pad and wrote straight through from beginning to end, without correcting, changing, or rewriting a sentence."

Cohn, write Moberg and Steinman, "had a distinct way of running a large laboratory; he managed by walking around. Rather than assume the role of boss, he would visit each person in every laboratory at least once a week to follow the progress of their experiments. Clad in a white lab coat with a pocket full of pencils and pens, and without any formalities, he arrived quietly, exchanged a few pleasantries about birds, children, or the weather, then inquired about a few experimental details and offered pithy insights or suggestions, and left just as silently. Without writing a single note he managed to keep track of the ongoing work and life of nearly 60 people. In turn, this personal attention encouraged special diligence on the part of the researchers who avoided unnecessary work and achieved astonishing progress in the whole laboratory."

The editors of the Journal of Experimental Medicine, in a posthumous tribute to Cohn, wrote that he had given the publication "years of leadership and energy." Adding that "his unique style enlivened our weekly deliberations," they praised his "incisive manner, his admiration of clever new experiments, his sense of fairness and respect, and his wit."

== Personal life and leisure activities ==
After Cohn's parents built a summer house in Amityville, Long Island, he developed what would become a "lifelong love of saltwater fishing." As an adult, he fished principally at Montauk, at the eastern end of Long Island, and one wall of his office "was covered with an enormous nautical survey map of all these waters where he fished from his boat Davess III....It was known he could be enticed to give lectures and attend conferences around the world when fishing, birding, or collecting nomadic rugs were a planned part of the visit."

== Films ==
A number of films were made to illustrate the processes Cohn studied, including Phagocytosis and Degranulation (with Hirsch, 1962) and Pinocytosis and Granule Formation in Macrophages (1967). The Journal of Experimental Medicine later noted that Hirsch and Cohn's "elegant films of live phagocytes...remain an ideal component for many courses in biology."

== Death ==
Cohn died suddenly of an aneurysm of the aorta. In addition to his wife and brother, he was survived by two children, David J. Cohn, a radiologist, and Ellen R. Cohn, editor-in-chief of the Benjamin Franklin papers, and three grandchildren.

== Cohn-Steinman Professorship ==
Ralph M. Steinman was awarded the Nobel Prize in Physiology or Medicine on October 3, 2011, only three days after his death. After his October 10 memorial service, the Steinman and Cohn families agreed to the establishment of a Zanvil A. Cohn-Ralph M. Steinman Professorship. Explaining why the two scientists merited this recognition, Rockefeller University noted that "Their intertwined scientific legacy is enormous, and their work in the Laboratory of Cellular Physiology and Immunology constitutes one of the most important scientific-cultural threads in the history of immunology – and of the University." The professorship was funded by $500,000 from the Steinman family and $2.6 million from 129 other donors, with the Steinman family's portion coming out of Steinman's Nobel Prize money. "It was Dr. Steinman's wish during his life," Rockefeller University pointed out, "to honor his mentor and collaborator, Zanvil A. Cohn, with whom he discovered dendritic cells and made scientific discoveries that transformed the field of immunology."

== Selected publications ==
1960

- With J. G. Hirsch. The isolation and properties of the specific cytoplasmic granules of rabbit polymorphonuclear leucocytes. J. Exp. Med. 112:983-1004.
- With J. G. Hirsch. Degranulation of polymorphonuclear leucocytes following phagocytosis of microorganisms. J. Exp. Med. 112:1005-1014.
- With J. G. Hirsch. The influence of phagocytosis on the intracellular distribution of granule‑associated components of polymorphonuclear leucocytes. J. Exp. Med. 112:1015-1022.

1963

- With E. Wiener. The particulate hydrolases of macrophages. II . Biochemical and morphological response to particle ingestion. J. Exp. Med. 118:1009-1020.

1965

- With B. Benson. The differentiation of mononuclear phagocytes. Morphology, cytochemistry, and biochemistry. J. Exp. Med. 121:153-170.

1966

- With M. E. Fedorko and J. G. Hirsch. The in vitro differentiation of mononuclear phagocytes. V. The formation of macrophage lysosomes. J. Exp. Med. 123:757-766.

1967

- With B. A. Ehrenreich. The uptake and digestion of iodinated human serum albumin by macrophages in vitro. J. Exp. Med. 126:941-958.

1968

- With R. van Furth. The origin and kinetics of mononuclear phagocytes. J. Exp. Med. 128:415-435.

1969

- With B. A. Ehrenreich. The uptake, storage, and intracellular hydrolysis of carbohydrates by macrophages. J. Exp. Med. 129:201-225.

1972

- With A. L. Hubbard. The enzymatic iodination of the red cell membrane. J. Cell Biol. 55:390-405.
- With R. M. Steinman. The interaction of soluble horseradish peroxidase in mouse peritoneal macrophages in vitro. J. Cell Biol. 55:186-204.
- With R. van Furth, J. G. Hirsch, J. H. Humphrey, W. G. Spector, and H. L. Langevoort. The mononuclear phagocyte system: A new classification of macrophages, monocytes, and their precursor cells. Bull. W. H. O. 46:845-852.

1973

- With R. M. Steinman. Identification of a novel cell type in peripheral lymphoid organs of mice. I. Morphology, quantitation, tissue distribution. J. Exp. Med. 137:1142-1162.

1974

- With S. Gordon and J. Todd. In vitro synthesis and secretion of lysozyme by mononuclear phagocytes. J. Exp. Med. 139:1228-1248.
- With S. Gordon and J. C. Unkeless. Induction of macrophage plasminogen activator by endotoxin stimulation and phagocytosis. Evidence for a two-stage process. J. Exp. Med. 140:995-1010.

1976

- With R. M. Steinman and S. E. Brodie. Membrane flow during pinocytosis. A stereologic analysis. J. Cell Biol. 68:665-687.

1977

- With S. C. Silverstein and R. M. Steinman. Endocytosis. Annu. Rev. Biochem. 46:669-722.

1978

- With N. Nogueira. Trypanosoma cruzi: In vitro induction of macrophage microbicidal activity. J. Exp. Med. 148:288-300.

1979

- With C. F. Nathan, S. C. Silverstein, and L. H. Brukner. Extracellular cytolysis by activated macrophages and granulocytes. II . Hydrogen peroxide as a mediator of cytotoxicity. J. Exp. Med. 149:100-113.

1980

- With I. S. Mellman, R. M. Steinman, and J. C. Unkeless. Selective iodination and polypeptide composition of pinocytic vesicles. J. Cell Biol. 86:712-722.
- With W. A. Muller and R. M. Steinman. The membrane proteins of the vacuolar system. II . Bidirectional flow between secondary lysosomes and plasma membrane. J. Cell Biol. 86:304-314.
- With C. F. Nathan and H. W. Murray. The macrophage as an effector cell. N. Engl. J. Med. 303:622-626.
- With W. A. Scott, J. M. Zrike, A. L. Hamill, and J. Kempe. Regulation of arachidonic acid metabolites in macrophages. J. Exp. Med. 152:324-335.

1982

- With W. A. Scott, N. A. Pawlowski, H. W. Murray, M. Andreach, and J. Zrike. Regulation of arachidonic acid metabolism by macrophage activation. J. Exp. Med. 155:1148-1160.
- With W. C. Van Voorhis, G. Kaplan, E. N. Sarno, M. A. Horwitz, R. M. Steinman, W. R. Levis, N. Nogueira, L. S. Hair, C. R. Gattass, and B. A. Arrick. The cutaneous infiltrates of leprosy. Cellular

characteristics and the predominant T-cell phenotypes. N. Engl. J. Med. 307:1593-1597.

- With J. D. Young, T. M. Young, L. P. Lu, and J. C. Unkeless. Characterization of a membrane pore-forming protein from Entamoeba histolytica. J. Exp. Med. 156:1677-1690.

1983

- The macrophage—versatile element of inflammation. In The Harvey Lectures: 1981–1982, series 77, pp. 63–80. Harvey Society of New York.
- With R. M. Steinman, I. S. Mellman, and W. A. Muller. Endocytosis and the recycling of plasma membrane. J. Cell Biol. 96:1-27.

1986

- With A. A. Aderem, D. S. Cohen, and S. D. Wright. Bacterial lipopolysaccharides prime macrophages for enhanced release of arachidonic acid metabolites. J. Exp. Med. 164:165-179.

1988

- With A. A. Aderem, K. A. Albert, M. M. Keum, J. K. T. Wang, and P. Greengard. Stimulus-dependent myristoylation of a major substrate for protein kinase C. Nature (Lond.) 332:362-364.

== See also ==
- Dendritic cell
- Ralph M. Steinman
