= List of Clarivate Citation laureates in Physiology or Medicine =

The following is a list of Clarivate Citation candidates considered likely to win the Nobel Prize in Physiology or Medicine. Since 2025, 19 out of 120 citation laureates starting in 2002 have eventually been awarded a Nobel Prize: Mario Capecchi, Martin Evans and Oliver Smithies (2007), Elizabeth Blackburn, Carol W. Greider and Jack W. Szostak (2009), Ralph M. Steinman (posthumously), Bruce Beutler and Jules A. Hoffmann (2011), Shinya Yamanaka (2012), James Rothman and Randy Schekman (2013), Yoshinori Ohsumi (2016), James P. Allison and Tasuku Honjo (2018), David Julius (2021), Victor Ambros and Gary Ruvkun (2024), Shimon Sakaguchi (2025), and Karl Deisseroth (2026).

== Laureates ==
	Laureates -- Year of Birth/Dead	Nationality	Motivations	Institute
2002–2005
—N/a	Michael Berridge (1938–2020)	United States	"for research on cell signaling, particularly discovering that inositol trisphosphate acts as a second messenger, linking events at the plasma membrane with the release of calcium ions (Ca2+) within the cell."	University of Virginia; University of Cambridge
—N/a	Alfred G. Knudson (1922–2016)	United States	"for discovery of a sequential accumulation of mutations in oncogenes and tumor suppressor genes, which results in cancer."	Stony Brook School of Medicine
	Bert Vogelstein (born 1949)	United States	"for discovery of a sequential accumulation of mutations in oncogenes and tumor suppressor genes, which results in cancer."	Johns Hopkins School of Medicine
	Robert Weinberg (born 1942)	United States	"for discovery of a sequential accumulation of mutations in oncogenes and tumor suppressor genes, which results in cancer."	Massachusetts Institute of Technology
	Francis Collins (born 1950)	United States	"for pioneering research in the sequencing of the human genome."	National Human Genome Research Institute
	Eric Lander (born 1957)	United States	"for pioneering research in the sequencing of the human genome."	Massachusetts Institute of Technology
—N/a	Craig Venter (1946-2026)	United States	"for pioneering research in the sequencing of the human genome."	State University of New York at Buffalo
2006
^{2007}	Mario Capecchi (born 1937)	Italy; United States	"for the development of the knockout mouse and the related technology of gene targeting, a method of using embryonic stem cells to create specific gene modifications in mice."	Harvard Medical School
^{2007}	Martin Evans (born 1941)	United Kingdom	"for the development of the knockout mouse and the related technology of gene targeting, a method of using embryonic stem cells to create specific gene modifications in mice."	University College London
^{2007}	Oliver Smithies (1925–2017)	United Kingdom; United States	"for the development of the knockout mouse and the related technology of gene targeting, a method of using embryonic stem cells to create specific gene modifications in mice."	University of North Carolina at Chapel Hill
—N/a	Pierre Chambon (1931-2026)	France	"for research studies on the function of nuclear hormone receptors and their function in human physiology."	Institute for Genetics and Cellular and Molecular Biology
	Ronald M. Evans (born 1949)	United States	"for research studies on the function of nuclear hormone receptors and their function in human physiology."	Salk Institute for Biological Studies
—N/a	Elwood V. Jensen (1920–2012)	United States	"for research studies on the function of nuclear hormone receptors and their function in human physiology."	University of Cincinnati
	Alec Jeffreys (born 1950)	United Kingdom	"for developing techniques on DNA profiling, the process of determining an individual's DNA characteristics."	University of Leicester
2007
	Fred Gage (born 1950)	United States	"for contributions of neurogenesis, in particular the discovery of stem cells in the adult human brain."	Salk Institute for Biological Studies
—N/a	R. John Ellis (1935-2025)	United Kingdom	"for pioneering studies on molecular chaperones, proteins that assist the conformational folding or unfolding of large proteins or macromolecular protein complexes."	University of Oxford; University of Cambridge
	Franz-Ulrich Hartl (born 1957)	Germany	"for pioneering studies on molecular chaperones, proteins that assist the conformational folding or unfolding of large proteins or macromolecular protein complexes."	Max Planck Institute of Biochemistry
	Arthur L. Horwich (born 1951)	United States	"for pioneering studies on molecular chaperones, proteins that assist the conformational folding or unfolding of large proteins or macromolecular protein complexes."	Yale School of Medicine; Howard Hughes Medical Institute
	Joan Massagué (born 1953)	Spain	"for discovery of the dual role of transforming growth factor beta (TGF-β), which can both inhibit and activate tumor cell growth, and identifying its importance in cancer."	Institute for Research in Biomedicine
2008
	Shizuo Akira (born 1953)	Japan	"for their research on toll-like receptors and innate immunity."	Osaka University
^{2011}	Bruce Beutler (born 1957)	United States	"for their research on toll-like receptors and innate immunity."	Scripps Research Institute
^{2011}	Jules A. Hoffmann (born 1941)	France	"for their research on toll-like receptors and innate immunity."	French National Centre for Scientific Research
^{2024}	Victor Ambros (born 1953)	United States	"for their discovery and analysis of the role of microRNAs (miRNAs) in gene regulation."	University of Massachusetts Chan Medical School
^{2024}	Gary Ruvkun (born 1952)	United States	"for their discovery and analysis of the role of microRNAs (miRNAs) in gene regulation."	Harvard Medical School
	Rory Collins (born 1955)	United Kingdom	"for their contributions to clinical medicine and epidemiology through the development and application of meta-analysis."	University of Oxford
	Richard Peto (born 1943)	United Kingdom	"for their contributions to clinical medicine and epidemiology through the development and application of meta-analysis."	University of Oxford
2009
^{2009}	Elizabeth Blackburn (born 1948)	Australia; United States	"for their roles in the discovery of and pioneering research on telomeres and telomerases."	University of California, San Francisco
^{2009}	Carol W. Greider (born 1961)	United States	"for their roles in the discovery of and pioneering research on telomeres and telomerases."	Johns Hopkins School of Medicine
^{2009}	Jack W. Szostak (born 1952)	Canada; United States	"for their roles in the discovery of and pioneering research on telomeres and telomerases."	Harvard Medical School; Howard Hughes Medical Institute
^{2013}	James Rothman (born 1950)	United States	"for their research on cellular membrane trafficking."	Yale University
^{2013}	Randy Schekman (born 1948)	United States	"for their research on cellular membrane trafficking."	University of California, Berkeley; Howard Hughes Medical Institute
	Seiji Ogawa (born 1934)	Japan	"for his fundamental discoveries leading to functional magnetic resonance imaging (fMRI), which has revolutionized basic research in brain science and diagnosis in clinical medicine."	Ogawa Laboratories for Brain Function Research
2010
—N/a	Douglas L. Coleman (1931–2014)	United States	"for the discovery of leptin, a hormone regulating appetite and metabolism."	Jackson Laboratory
	Jeffrey M. Friedman (born 1954)	United States	"for the discovery of leptin, a hormone regulating appetite and metabolism."	Rockefeller University; Howard Hughes Medical Institute
—N/a	Ernest McCulloch (1926–2011)	Canada	"for the discovery of stem cells and the development of induced pluripotent stem cells."	Ontario Cancer Institute
—N/a	James Till (1931–2025)	Canada	"for the discovery of stem cells and the development of induced pluripotent stem cells."	Ontario Cancer Institute
^{2012}	Shinya Yamanaka (born 1962)	Japan	"for the discovery of stem cells and the development of induced pluripotent stem cells."	Kyoto University; University of California, San Francisco
^{2011}	Ralph M. Steinman (1943–2011)	Canada	"for the discovery of dendritic cells, key regulators of immune response."	Rockefeller University
2011
	Brian Druker (born 1955)	United States	"for their development of imatinib and dasatinib, revolutionary, targeted treatments for chronic myeloid leukemia."	Howard Hughes Medical Institute; Oregon Health & Science University
	Charles Sawyers (born 1959)	United States	"for their development of imatinib and dasatinib, revolutionary, targeted treatments for chronic myeloid leukemia."	Howard Hughes Medical Institute; Memorial Sloan Kettering Cancer Center
	Nicholas Lydon (born 1957)	United Kingdom	"for their development of imatinib and dasatinib, revolutionary, targeted treatments for chronic myeloid leukemia."	AnaptysBio; Blueprint Medicines
	Robert S. Langer (born 1948)	United States	"for their pioneering research in tissue engineering and regenerative medicine."	Massachusetts Institute of Technology
	Joseph P. Vacanti (born 1948)	United States	"for their pioneering research in tissue engineering and regenerative medicine."	Harvard Medical School; Massachusetts General Hospital
	Jacques Miller (born 1931)	France; Australia	"for his discovery of the function of the thymus and the identification of T cells and B cells in mammalian species."	University of Melbourne; Walter and Eliza Hall Institute of Medical Research
	Robert L. Coffman (born 1948)	United States	"for their discovery of two types of T lymphocytes, TH1 and TH2, and their role in regulating host immune response."	Dynavax Technologies
	Timothy Mosmann (born 1949)	United States	"for their discovery of two types of T lymphocytes, TH1 and TH2, and their role in regulating host immune response."	University of Rochester
2012
—N/a	Charles David Allis (1951–2023)	United States	"for fundamental discoveries concerning histone modifications and their role in genetic regulation."	Rockefeller University
—N/a	Michael Grunstein (1946–2024)	United States	"for fundamental discoveries concerning histone modifications and their role in genetic regulation."	University of California, Los Angeles
	Anthony R. Hunter (born 1943)	United Kingdom; United States	"for the discovery of tyrosine phosphorylation and contributions to understanding protein kinases and their role in signal transduction."	Salk Institute for Biological Studies; University of California, San Diego
—N/a	Tony Pawson (1952–2013)	Canada	"for identification of the phosphotyrosine binding SH2 domain and demonstrating its function in protein-protein interactions."	University of Toronto
—N/a	Richard Hynes (1944-2026)	United Kingdom	"for pioneering discoveries of cell adhesion molecules, Hynes and Ruoslahti for integrins and Takeichi for cadherins."	Massachusetts Institute of Technology; Howard Hughes Medical Institute
	Erkki Ruoslahti (born 1940)	Finland	"for pioneering discoveries of cell adhesion molecules, Hynes and Ruoslahti for integrins and Takeichi for cadherins."	University of California, Santa Barbara
	Masatoshi Takeichi (born 1943)	Japan	"for pioneering discoveries of cell adhesion molecules, Hynes and Ruoslahti for integrins and Takeichi for cadherins."	Riken Institute of Physical and Chemical Research
2013
	Adrian Bird (born 1947)	United Kingdom	"for their fundamental discoveries concerning DNA methylation and gene expression."	University of Edinburgh
	Howard Cedar (born 1943)	Israel; United States	"for their fundamental discoveries concerning DNA methylation and gene expression."	Hebrew University of Jerusalem
—N/a	Aharon Razin (1935–2019)	Israel	"for their fundamental discoveries concerning DNA methylation and gene expression."	Hebrew University of Jerusalem
	Daniel J. Klionsky (born 1958)	United States	"for elucidating the molecular mechanisms and physiological function of autophagy."	University of Michigan
	Noboru Mizushima (born 1966)	Japan	"for elucidating the molecular mechanisms and physiological function of autophagy."	University of Tokyo
^{2016}	Yoshinori Ohsumi (born 1945)	Japan	"for elucidating the molecular mechanisms and physiological function of autophagy."	Tokyo Institute of Technology
	Dennis Slamon (born 1948)	United States	"for his pioneering research identifying the HER-2/neu oncogene, leading to more effective cancer therapy."	University of California, Los Angeles
2014
	James E. Darnell (born 1930)	United States	"for fundamental discoveries concerning eukaryotic transcription and gene regulation."	Rockefeller University
	Robert G. Roeder (born 1942)	United States	"for fundamental discoveries concerning eukaryotic transcription and gene regulation."	Rockefeller University
	Robert Tjian (born 1949)	Hong Kong; United States	"for fundamental discoveries concerning eukaryotic transcription and gene regulation."	University of California, Berkeley; Howard Hughes Medical Institute
^{2021}	David Julius (born 1955)	United States	"for elucidating molecular mechanisms of pain sensation."	University of California, San Francisco
	Charles Lee (born 1969)	Canada	"for their discovery of large-scale copy number variation and its association with specific diseases."	Jackson Laboratory
	Stephen W. Scherer (born 1964)	Canada	"for their discovery of large-scale copy number variation and its association with specific diseases."	University of Toronto
	Michael Wigler (born 1947)	United States	"for their discovery of large-scale copy number variation and its association with specific diseases."	Cold Spring Harbor Laboratory
2015
	Jeffrey I. Gordon (born 1947)	United States	"for demonstrating the relationship between the human gut microbiome and physiology, metabolism, and nutrition."	Washington University in St. Louis
	Kazutoshi Mori (born 1958)	Japan	"for independently identifying the mechanism by which unfolded proteins in the endoplasmic reticulum are detected and corrected."	Kyoto University
	Peter Walter (born 1954)	Germany; United States	"for independently identifying the mechanism by which unfolded proteins in the endoplasmic reticulum are detected and corrected."	University of California, Los Angeles; Howard Hughes Medical Institute
	Alexander Rudensky (born 1956)	United States	"for their seminal discoveries concerning the nature and function of regulatory T cells and the transcription factor Foxp3."	Memorial Sloan Kettering Cancer Center; Howard Hughes Medical Institute
^{2025}	Shimon Sakaguchi (born 1951)	Japan	"for their seminal discoveries concerning the nature and function of regulatory T cells and the transcription factor Foxp3."	Osaka University
	Ethan M. Shevach (born 1943)	United States	"for their seminal discoveries concerning the nature and function of regulatory T cells and the transcription factor Foxp3."	National Institute of Allergy and Infectious Diseases
2016
^{2018}	James P. Allison (born 1948)	United States	"for explaining how CD28 and CTLA-4 are regulators of T cell activation, modulating immune response."	University of Texas
	Jeffrey Bluestone (born 1954)	United States	"for explaining how CD28 and CTLA-4 are regulators of T cell activation, modulating immune response."	University of California, San Francisco
	Craig B. Thompson (born 1953)	United States	"for explaining how CD28 and CTLA-4 are regulators of T cell activation, modulating immune response."	Memorial Sloan Kettering Cancer Center
	Gordon J. Freeman (born ?)	United States	"for elucidating programmed cell death-1 (PD-1) and its pathway, which has advanced cancer immunotherapy."	Harvard Medical School
^{2018}	Tasuku Honjo (born 1942)	Japan	"for elucidating programmed cell death-1 (PD-1) and its pathway, which has advanced cancer immunotherapy."	Kyoto University
	Arlene Sharpe (born 1953)	United States	"for elucidating programmed cell death-1 (PD-1) and its pathway, which has advanced cancer immunotherapy."	Harvard Medical School; Brigham and Women's Hospital
	Michael N. Hall (born 1953)	United States; Switzerland	"for discoveries of the growth regulator Target of Rapamycin (TOR) and the mechanistic Target of Rapamycin (mTOR)."	University of Basel
	David M. Sabatini (born 1968)	United States	"for discoveries of the growth regulator Target of Rapamycin (TOR) and the mechanistic Target of Rapamycin (mTOR)."	Broad Institute; Massachusetts Institute of Technology
	Stuart Schreiber (born 1956)	United States	"for discoveries of the growth regulator Target of Rapamycin (TOR) and the mechanistic Target of Rapamycin (mTOR)."	Harvard University; Howard Hughes Medical Institute
2017
	Lewis C. Cantley (born 1949)	United States	"for discovery of the signaling pathway phosphoinositide 3-kinase (PI3K) and elucidation of its role in tumor growth."	Weill Cornell Medical College
	Karl J. Friston (born 1959)	United Kingdom	"for fundamental contributions to the analysis of brain imaging data, specifically through statistical parametric mapping and voxel-based morphometry."	University College London
	Yuan Chang-Moore (born 1959)	Taiwan; United States	"for their discovery of the Kaposi's sarcoma-associated herpesvirus, or human herpesvirus 8 (KSHV/HHV8)."	University of Pittsburgh Cancer Institute
	Patrick S. Moore (born 1956)	United States	"for their discovery of the Kaposi's sarcoma-associated herpesvirus, or human herpesvirus 8 (KSHV/HHV8)."	University of Pittsburgh Cancer Institute
2018
	Minoru Kanehisa (born 1948)	Japan	"for contributions to bioinformatics, specifically for his development of the Kyoto Encyclopedia of Genes andGenomes (KEGG)."	Kyoto University
	Solomon H. Snyder (born 1938)	United States	"for his identification of receptors for many neurotransmitters and psychotropic agents."	Johns Hopkins University
	Napoleone Ferrara (born 1956)	Italy; United States	"for the discovery of vascular endothelial growth factor (VEGF), a key regulator of angiogenesis."	University of California, San Diego
2019
	Hans Clevers (born 1957)	Netherlands	"for research on the Wnt signaling pathway and its role in stem cells and cancer."	Hubrecht Institute for Developmental Biology and Stem Cell Research
	John Kappler (born 1943)	United States	"for their discovery of T-cell tolerance by clonal elimination in the thymus."	National Jewish Health
	Philippa Marrack-Kappler (born 1945)	United Kingdom	"for their discovery of T-cell tolerance by clonal elimination in the thymus."	National Jewish Health
	Ernst Bamberg (born 1940)	Germany	"for contributions to the invention and development of optogenetics."	Max Planck Institute of Biophysics
^{2026}	Karl Deisseroth (born 1971)	United States	"for contributions to the invention and development of optogenetics."	Stanford University; Howard Hughes Medical Institute
	Gero Miesenböck (born 1965)	Austria	"for contributions to the invention and development of optogenetics."	Oxford University
2020
	Pamela J. Bjorkman (born 1956)	United States	"for determining the structure and function of major histocompatibility complex (MHC) proteins, a landmark discovery in molecular immunology that has contributed to drug and vaccine development."	California Institute of Technology
	Jack L. Strominger (born 1925)	United States	"for determining the structure and function of major histocompatibility complex (MHC) proteins, a landmark discovery in molecular immunology that has contributed to drug and vaccine development."	Harvard University
	Yusuke Nakamura (born 1952)	Japan	"for pioneering research developing and applying genetic polymorphic markers and for contributions to genome-wide association studies, both heralding personalized approaches to cancer treatment."	Japanese Foundation for Cancer Research; University of Tokyo
	Huda Zoghbi (born 1954)	Lebanon; United States	"for discoveries on the pathogenesis of neurological disorders including the genetic origins of Rett syndrome."	Baylor College of Medicine; Texas Children's Hospital
2021
	Jean-Pierre Changeux (born 1936)	France	"for contributions to our understanding of neuroreceptors and especially the identification of the nicotinic acetylcholine receptor and its allosteric properties."	Collège de France; Institut Pasteur
	Toshio Hirano (born 1947)	Japan	"for discovery of interleukin-6, description of its physiological and pathological actions, that has contributed to drug development."	Osaka University; National Institute of Radiological Sciences
	Tadamitsu Kishimoto (born 1939)	Japan	"for discovery of interleukin-6, description of its physiological and pathological actions, that has contributed to drug development."	Osaka University
—N/a	Karl Johnson (1929–2023)	United States	"for identification and isolation of the Hantaan virus (hantavirus), agent of hemorrhagic fever with renal syndrome."	University of New Mexico
—N/a	Ho Wang Lee (1928–2022)	South Korea	"for identification and isolation of the Hantaan virus (hantavirus), agent of hemorrhagic fever with renal syndrome."	Korea University; National Academy of Sciences
2022
	Masato Hasegawa (born 1961)	Japan	"for the identification of TDP-43, a pathological signature of amyotrophic lateral sclerosis (ALS) and frontotemporal lobar degeneration (FTLD), and for other contributions to the study of neurodegenerative diseases."	Tokyo Metropolitan Institute of Medical Science
	Virginia Man-Yee Lee (born 1945)	China; United States	"for the identification of TDP-43, a pathological signature of amyotrophic lateral sclerosis (ALS) and frontotemporal lobar degeneration (FTLD), and for other contributions to the study of neurodegenerative diseases."	University of Pennsylvania
	Mary-Claire King (born 1946)	United States	"for demonstrating inherited susceptibility for breast and ovarian cancer and discovering the role played by mutations of the BRCA1 gene."	University of Washington
	Stuart Orkin (born 1946)	United States	"for foundational research on the genetic basis of blood diseases and for advancing gene therapy for sickle cell anemia and beta-thalassemia."	Harvard Medical School; Howard Hughes Medical Institute
2023
	Carl H. June (born 1953)	United States	"for breakthrough research advancing chimeric antigen receptor T-cell therapy for the treatment of cancer."	University of Pennsylvania
	Steven A. Rosenberg (born 1940)	United States	"for breakthrough research advancing chimeric antigen receptor T-cell therapy for the treatment of cancer."	National Cancer Institute
	Michel Sadelain (born 1960)	United States	"for breakthrough research advancing chimeric antigen receptor T-cell therapy for the treatment of cancer."	Memorial Sloan Kettering Cancer Center
	Rob Knight (born 1976)	New Zealand	"for computational and experimental research revealing the complex microbial ecosystems of the human body."	University of California San Diego
	Emmanuel Mignot (born 1959)	France	"for genetic and physiological studies of the sleep/wake cycle and the discovery of hypocretin/orexin as important regulators of sleep involved in the cause of narcolepsy."	Stanford University
	Clifford B. Saper (born 1952)	United States	"for genetic and physiological studies of the sleep/wake cycle and the discovery of hypocretin/orexin as important regulators of sleep involved in the cause of narcolepsy."	Harvard Medical School
	Masashi Yanagisawa (born 1960)	Japan; United States	"for genetic and physiological studies of the sleep/wake cycle and the discovery of hypocretin/orexin as important regulators of sleep involved in the cause of narcolepsy."	University of Tsukuba
2024
	Helen Hobbs (born 1952)	United States	"for research on the genetics of lipid metabolism, which has led to new drugs to treat cardiovascular diseases."	Howard Hughes Medical Institute; University of Texas Southwestern Medical Center
	Jonathan C. Cohen (born ?)	United States	"for research on the genetics of lipid metabolism, which has led to new drugs to treat cardiovascular diseases."	University of Texas Southwestern Medical Center
	Ann Graybiel (born 1942)	United States	"for physiological studies of the basal ganglia, central to motor control and behavior including learning."	Massachusetts Institute of Technology
	Okihide Hikosaka (born 1948)	Japan	"for physiological studies of the basal ganglia, central to motor control and behavior including learning."	National Institutes of Health
	Wolfram Schultz (born ?)	Germany	"for physiological studies of the basal ganglia, central to motor control and behavior including learning."	University of Cambridge
	Davor Solter (born 1941)	Yugoslavia	"for the discovery of genomic imprinting, advancing our understanding of epigenetics and mammalian development."	Max Planck Institute of Immunobiology and Epigenetics
	Azim Surani (born 1945)	Kenya; United Kingdom	"for the discovery of genomic imprinting, advancing our understanding of epigenetics and mammalian development."	University of Cambridge
2025
	Andrea Ablasser (born 1983)	Germany	"for elucidating the cGAS-STING pathway, a fundamental mechanism of innate immunity."	École Polytechnique Fédérale de Lausanne
	Glen Barber (born ?)	United Kingdom; United States	"for elucidating the cGAS-STING pathway, a fundamental mechanism of innate immunity."	Ohio State University
	Zhijian Chen (born 1966)	China; United States	"for elucidating the cGAS-STING pathway, a fundamental mechanism of innate immunity."	University of Texas Southwestern Medical Center
	John Edgar Dick (born 1954)	Canada	"for identifying leukemia stem cells and establishing their relevance in therapy failure and disease recurrence, thereby shifting the focus for many types of cancer and their treatments."	University Health Network; University of Toronto
	Kenji Kangawa (born 1948)	Japan	"for discovery of ghrelin, a hormone regulating appetite, energy, and metabolism."	National Cerebral and Cardiovascular Center
	Masayasu Kojima (born 1958)	Japan	"for discovery of ghrelin, a hormone regulating appetite, energy, and metabolism."	Kurume University
2026
	Daniel J. Drucker (born 1956)	Canada	"for identification and characterization of Glucagon-Like Peptide-1 (GLP-1) and studies of its biological activity."	Lunenfeld-Tanenbaum Research Institute
	Jens Juul Holst (born 1945)	Denmark	"for identification and characterization of Glucagon-Like Peptide-1 (GLP-1) and studies of its biological activity."	University of Copenhagen
	Svetlana Mojsov (born 1947)	United States	"for identification and characterization of Glucagon-Like Peptide-1 (GLP-1) and studies of its biological activity."	Rockefeller University
	James G. Fujimoto (born 1957)	United States	"for the development of optical coherence tomography, a new imaging modality in medicine, biomedical research, and other applications."	Massachusetts Institute of Technology
	David Huang (born 1964)	United States	"for the development of optical coherence tomography, a new imaging modality in medicine, biomedical research, and other applications."	Oregon Health & Science University
	Eric A. Swanson (born 1960)	United States	"for the development of optical coherence tomography, a new imaging modality in medicine, biomedical research, and other applications."	Massachusetts Institute of Technology
	Timothy A. Springer (born 1948)	United States	"for identifying key adhesion receptors in the immune system."	Harvard Medical School
