= William B. Coley Award =

American cancer research award

The William B. Coley Award for Distinguished Research in Basic and Tumor Immunology is presented annually by the Cancer Research Institute, to scientists who have made outstanding achievements in the fields of basic and tumor immunology and whose work has deepened our understanding of the immune system's response to disease, including cancer.

The first awards were made in 1975 to a group of 16 scientists called the "Founders of Cancer Immunology." In 1993, the award was renamed after William B. Coley, a late-nineteenth century surgeon who made the first attempts at the non-surgical treatment of cancer through stimulation of the immune system. For this reason, Coley has become known as the "Father of Cancer Immunotherapy."

== Recipients ==
- 1975: Garry Abelev
  Edward A. Boyse
  Edgar J. Foley
  Robert A. Good
  Peter A. Gorer, FRS
  Ludwik Gross
  Gertrude Henle & Werner Henle
  Robert J. Huebner
  Edmund Klein
  Eva Klein & George Klein
  Donald L. Morton
  Lloyd J. Old
  Richmond T. Prehn
  Hans O. Sjögren
- 1978: Howard B. Andervont
  Jacob Furth
  Earl L. Green & Margaret C. Green
  Walter E. Heston
  Clarence C. Little
  George D. Snell
  Leonell C. Strong
- 1979: Yuang-yun Chu
  Zongtang Sun
  Zhao-you Tang
- 1983: Richard K. Gershon
- 1987: Thierry Boon
  Rolf M. Zinkernagel
- 1989: Howard Grey
  Alain Townsend
  Emil Unanue
- 1993: Pamela Bjorkman
  John Kappler
  Philippa Marrack
  Alvaro Morales
  Jack Strominger
  Don Wiley
- 1995: Ferdy J. Lejeune
  Malcolm A. S. Moore
  Timothy Springer
- 1996: Giorgio Trinchieri
- 1997: Robert L. Coffman
  Tim R. Mosmann
  Stuart F. Schlossman
- 1998: Klas Kärre
  Lorenzo Moretta
  Ralph M. Steinman
- 1999: James E. Darnell, Jr.
  Ian M. Kerr
  Richard A. Lerner
  George Robert Stark, FRS
  Greg Winter
- 2000: Mark M. Davis
  Michael Pfreundschuh
- 2001: Robert D. Schreiber
- 2002: Lewis Lanier
  David H. Raulet
  Mark J. Smyth
- 2003: Jules A. Hoffmann
  Charles Janeway
  Bruno Lemaitre
  Ruslan Medzhitov
- 2004: Shimon Sakaguchi
  Ethan M. Shevach
- 2005: For Distinguished Research in Basic and Tumor Immunology
  James P. Allison
- 2006: For Distinguished Research in Basic Immunology
  Shizuo Akira
  Bruce A. Beutler
  For Distinguished Research in Tumor Immunology
  Ian H. Frazer
  Harald zur Hausen
- 2007: For Distinguished Research in Basic and Tumor Immunology
  Jeffrey V. Ravetch
- 2008: For Distinguished Research in Basic and Tumor Immunology
  Michael John Bevan, FRS
- 2009: For Distinguished Research in Tumor Immunology
  Cornelis Melief
  For Distinguished Research in Basic Immunology (joint prize)
  Frederick W. Alt
  Klaus Rajewsky
- 2010: For Distinguished Research in Tumor Immunology
  Haruo Ohtani
  Wolf Herve Fridman
  Jérôme Galon
- 2011: For Distinguished Research in Tumor Immunology (joint prize)
  Philip Greenberg
  Steven A. Rosenberg
- 2012: For Distinguished Research in Basic Immunology (joint prize)
  Richard A. Flavell, FRS.
  Laurie H. Glimcher
  Kenneth M. Murphy
  For Distinguished Research in Tumor Immunology (joint prize)
  Carl H. June
  Michel Sadelain
- 2013: For Distinguished Research in Basic Immunology
  Michael B. Karin
- 2014: For Distinguished Research in Tumor Immunology (joint prize)
  Tasuku Honjo
  Lieping Chen
  Arlene Sharpe
  Gordon J. Freeman
- 2015: Glenn Dranoff, for Distinguished Research in Tumor Immunology
  Alexander Y. Rudensky, for Distinguished Research in Basic Immunology
- 2016: Ton N. Schumacher, for Distinguished Research in Tumor Immunology
  Dan R. Littman, for Distinguished Research in Basic Immunology
- 2017: Thomas F. Gajewski, for Distinguished Research in Tumor Immunology
  Rafi Ahmed, for Distinguished Research in Basic Immunology
- 2018: Miriam Merad, for Distinguished Research in Basic Immunology
  Padmanee Sharma, for Distinguished Research in Tumor Immunology
- 2019:For Distinguished Research in Basic Immunology
  Zelig Eshhar
  Lawrence E. Samelson
  Brian Seed
  Arthur Weiss
  For Distinguished Research in Tumor Immunology
  Elizabeth M. Jaffee
  Antoni Ribas
- 2020:For Distinguished Research in Basic Immunology and Tumor Immunology
  Andrea Ablasser
  Glen N. Barber
  Zhijian J. Chen
  Veit Hornung
  Russell E. Vance
- 2021:For Distinguished Research in Basic Immunology and Tumor Immunology
  Katalin Karikó
  Drew Weissman
  Uğur Şahin
  Özlem Türeci
- 2022:For Distinguished Research in Basic Immunology and Tumor Immunology
  Vishva Dixit
  Judy Lieberman
  Feng Shao
  Hao Wu
- 2023:For Distinguished Research in Basic Immunology and Tumor Immunology
  Tak W. Mak
- 2024:For Distinguished Research in Basic Immunology and Tumor Immunology
  Mark Anderson MD PhD

== See also ==
- List of biomedical science awards
