= Russell E. Vance =

Immunologist and microbiologist

- Vance in 2026
- Alma mater: Queen's University (BSc, MA); University of California, Berkeley (PhD)
- Known for: Work on STING, inflammasomes, and host resistance to tuberculosis and Shigella
- Awards: Member, National Academy of Sciences (2026); William B. Coley Award (2020)
- Scientific career
- Fields: Immunology, innate immunity
- Workplaces: University of California, Berkeley; Howard Hughes Medical Institute
- Doctoral advisor: David Raulet

Russell E. Vance is an immunologist and Professor of Immunology and Molecular Medicine at the University of California, Berkeley and an investigator of the Howard Hughes Medical Institute (HHMI). His research investigates the role of the innate immune system in pathogen detection and elimination, with a particular focus on inflammasomes, the STING pathway, and the immune response to bacterial pathogens such as Legionella pneumophila, Mycobacterium tuberculosis, and Shigella flexneri. He was elected to the National Academy of Sciences in 2026.

== Education and career ==
Vance obtained a BSc(Honours) in Biochemistry (1994) and an MA in Philosophy (1995) from Queen's University, and a PhD in Immunology from the University of California, Berkeley (2000), under the mentorship of David Raulet. Vance then conducted postdoctoral research at Harvard Medical School with John Mekalanos and William Dietrich.

Vance joined the Berkeley faculty in 2006 as an Assistant Professor, and is currently a Professor of Immunology and Molecular Medicine in the Department of Molecular and Cell Biology. He has been an HHMI investigator since 2013. From 2013 to 2026 he was director of Berkeley's Cancer Research Laboratory, and in 2026 he became Head of the Division of Immunology and Molecular Medicine in the Department of Molecular and Cell Biology at UC Berkeley.

== Research ==
Vance's research focuses on identifying mechanisms by which the innate immune system of mammals recognizes and orchestrates defense against bacterial and viral pathogens.

=== STING and cyclic dinucleotides ===
In 2011, Vance's laboratory reported that STING directly binds the bacterial second messenger cyclic di-GMP thereby identifying STING as a receptor for cyclic dinucleotides. A 2013 study from the laboratory reported that the DNA sensor cGAS produces a noncanonical cyclic dinucleotide, 2'3'cGAMP, that activates human STING.

=== Inflammasomes ===
Vance's group discovered that NAIP proteins act as cytosolic receptors for flagellin and other bacterial proteins, and that ligand-bound NAIP assembles with NLRC4 to form an inflammasome. A 2017 study determined the cryo-EM structure of NAIP5 bound to flagellin. In 2019, the laboratory described "functional degradation" as a mechanism by which the NLRP1 inflammasome is activated by pathogen enzymes. The laboratory also reported that mice lacking NAIP or NLRC4 are susceptible to oral infection with Shigella flexneri, providing a mouse model of shigellosis.

== Awards and honors ==
- 2026 Elected to the National Academy of Sciences
- 2020 William B. Coley Award for Distinguished Research in Basic and Tumor Immunology, from the Cancer Research Institute, shared with Andrea Ablasser, Glen N. Barber, Zhijian Chen and Veit Hornung for work on the cGAS-STING pathway

== Selected publications ==
- Burdette, D. L.; et al. (2011). "STING is a direct innate immune sensor of cyclic di-GMP". Nature. 478: 515‚Äì518. PMC 3203314.
- Kofoed, E. M.; Vance, R. E. (2011). "Innate immune recognition of bacterial ligands by NAIPs determines inflammasome specificity". Nature. 477: 592‚Äì595. PMC 3184209.
- Sandstrom, A.; et al. (2019). "Functional degradation: A mechanism of NLRP1 inflammasome activation by diverse pathogen enzymes". Science. 364: eaau1330. PMC 6532986.
