= Ethan M. Shevach =

American immunologist

- Born: 1943 (age 82–83)
- Citizenship: United States
- Education: Boston University Medical School (MD 1967)
- Known for: regulatory T cells
- Awards: William B. Coley Award (2004)
- Scientific career
- Fields: immunology
- Institutions: NIAID

Ethan Menahem Shevach (born 1943) is an American immunologist at the National Institute of Allergy and Infectious Diseases (NIAID) in Bethesda, Maryland.

== Biography ==
Shevach obtained his M.D. from Boston University Medical School in 1967. After clinical training, he joined NIAID as a senior staff fellow in 1972 becoming head of a research group the following year and a departmental head (section chief) in 1987. As of 2018, he is head of the Department of Cellular Immunology at NIAID.

Shevach served as editor-in-chief of the Journal of Immunology from 1987 to 1992 and edited Cellular Immunology from 1996 to 2007.

== Research ==
Shevach made significant contributions towards understanding the function of regulatory T cells (T_{Reg} cells) in mediating the immune response. He discovered a subset of CD4+ T cells that express the transcription factor FOXP3 and operate by a mechanism that is distinct from the cytokine cascade. Known as T_{Reg} cells, their primary function is immunosuppressive. These T_{Reg} cells are targets for therapies against autoimmune diseases, cancer, and transplanted tissue rejection.

== Awards ==
He has been a member of the American Association of Immunologists since 1973 and received its Distinguished Service Award in 1992.

In 2004, together with Shimon Sakaguchi, he won the Cancer Research Institute's William B. Coley Award for Distinguished Research in Basic and Tumor Immunology for his part in elucidating the function of regulatory T cells in the control of autoimmune diseases.

Since 2015, Thomson Reuters (now Clarivate) has listed Shevach as among those most likely to win a Nobel Prize, based on his citation record.
