= Fred Ramsdell =

American immunologist (born 1960)

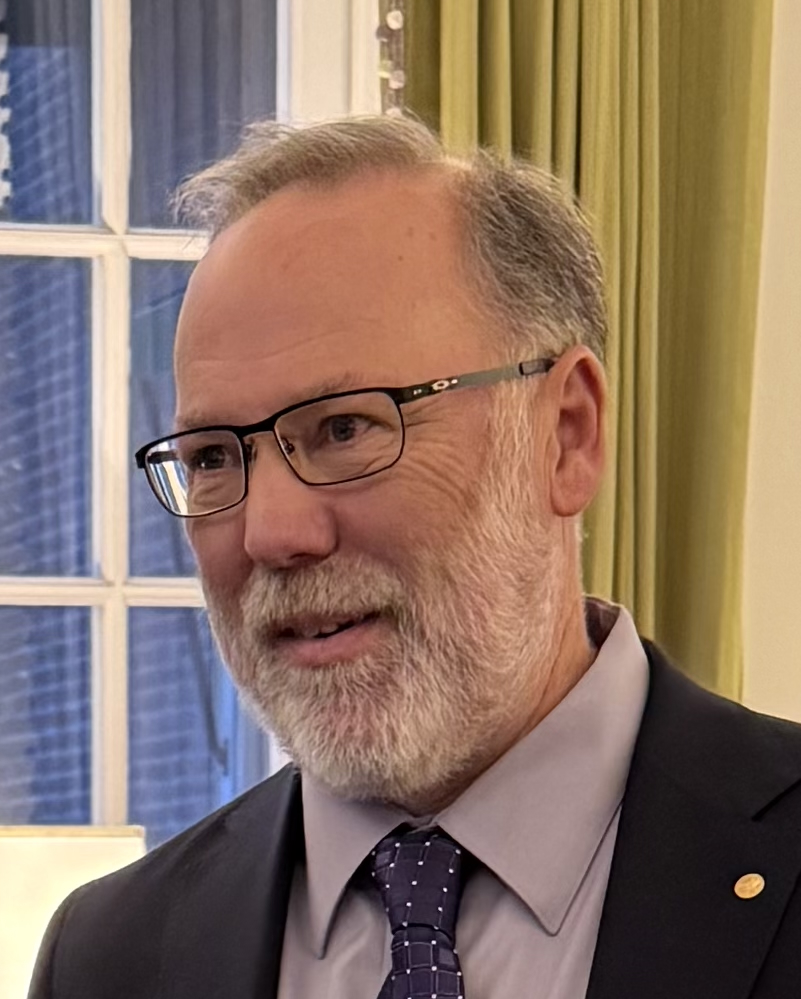
- Ramsdell in 2025 at the U.S. Embassy Sweden Nobel laureate reception
- Born: Frederick Jay Ramsdell; December 4, 1960 (age 65); Elmhurst, Illinois, U.S.
- Education: University of California, San Diego (BS); University of California, Los Angeles (PhD)
- Awards: Crafoord Prize (2017); Nobel Prize in Physiology or Medicine (2025)
- Scientific career
- Workplaces: Parker Institute for Cancer Immunotherapy
- Thesis: Generation of lymphokine-activated killer cells from non-natural killer cell sources: Development from human thymocytes (1988)
- Academic advisors: Sidney Golub

Frederick Jay Ramsdell (born December 4, 1960) is an American immunologist and Nobel Prize laureate. As of 2025, he is an advisor at Sonoma Biotherapeutics, a biotechnology company co-founded by him.

In 2025, he was jointly awarded the Nobel Prize in Physiology or Medicine with Mary E. Brunkow and Shimon Sakaguchi for their work in peripheral tolerance.

== Early life and education ==
Ramsdell was born on December 4, 1960, in Elmhurst, Illinois.

After graduating from Homestead High School (California) in 1979, Ramsdell initially attended Foothill College because he could not afford a four-year UC education, before transferring to University of California, San Diego. He received a Bachelor of Science degree with a major in biochemistry and cell biology from UCSD in 1983. In the same year, he enrolled at the University of California, Los Angeles, as a doctoral student, and studied microbiology and immunology under the mentorship of Sidney Golub, receiving his PhD in 1987.

== Career ==
Ramsdell qualified for food stamps as a graduate student when he began his fellowship at the National Institutes of Health for postgraduate training after earning his PhD. After that, he joined the biopharmaceutical company Immunex, where his research focus was T cell activation and tolerance, and gene discovery. In 1994, he joined the Bothell, Washington-based biotechnology company Darwin Molecular (along with Mary E. Brunkow), where he established an immunology program. Darwin Molecular was acquired by Chiroscience in 1996. Three years later, Chiroscience merged with Celltech (briefly under the name Celltech Chiroscience). In 2004, Ramsdell and Brunkow left the company.

He joined ZymoGenetics in 2004 where he led research teams focusing on novel proteins with potential regulatory activity in lymphoid cells. In 2008, he started working at Novo Nordisk where he helped establish the firm's Inflammation Research Center in Seattle and became leader of the immunobiology group.

Later, he served as vice president at aTyr Pharma in San Diego, before joining the Parker Institute for Cancer Immunotherapy in San Francisco, where he was chief scientific officer.

In 2019, he co-founded the San Francisco-based Sonoma Biotherapeutics with Jeffrey Bluestone, Qizhi Tang and Alexander Rudensky, where he held the role of chief scientific officer. As of 2025, he is the chair of the company's scientific advisory board.

== Research ==
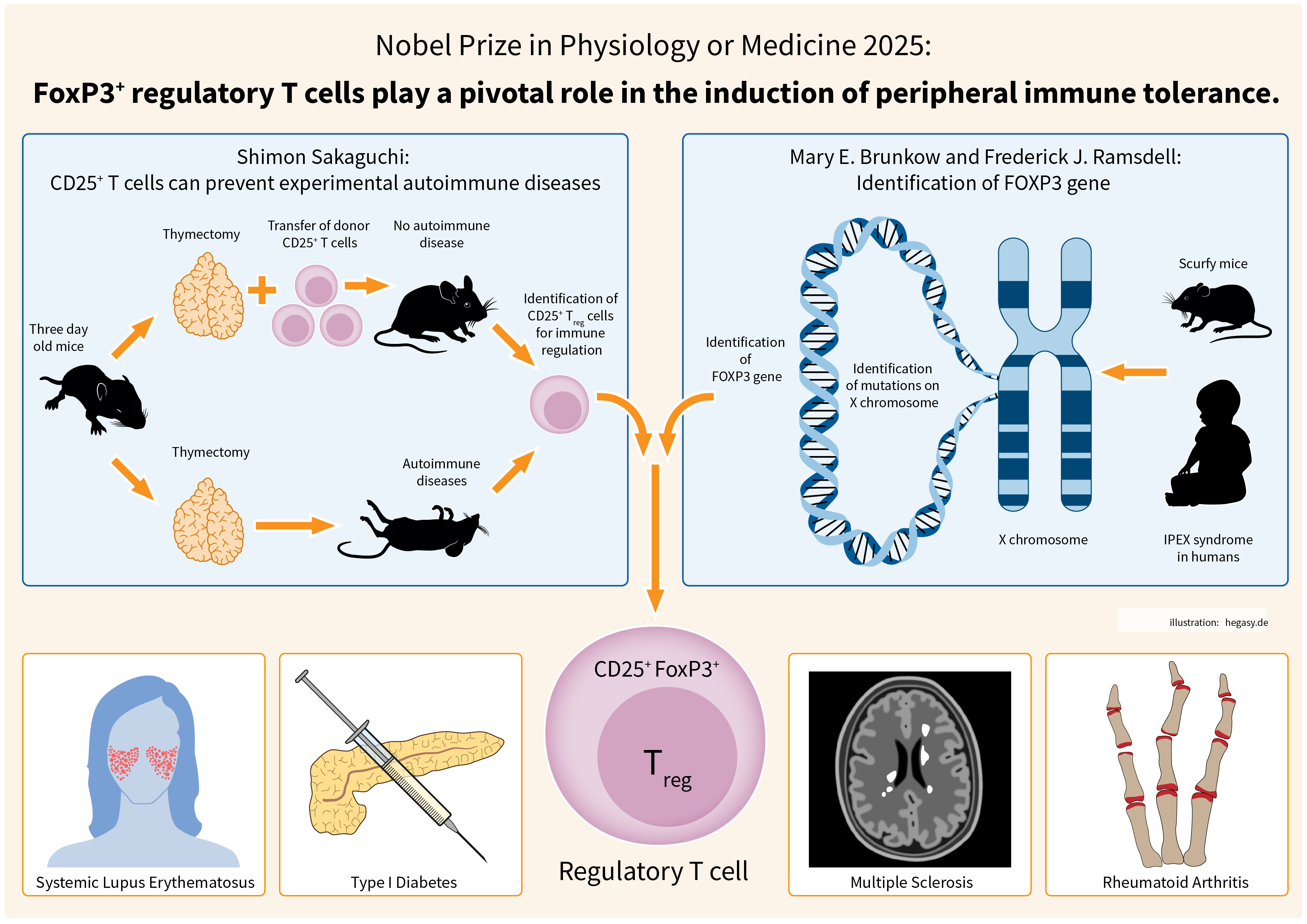
Nobel Prize in Physiology or Medicine 2025: FoxP3^{+} T_{reg} cells in peripheral immune tolerance

In the 1990s, while working at Celltech in Bothell, Washington, Ramsdell and Brunkow studied a strain of mice, called scurfy, characterized by serious autoimmune disease, setting out to identify the mutation responsible for the phenotype. After establishing a candidate region on the X chromosome containing approximately 20 potential genes, they identified an insertion of two base pairs in a previously unknown gene, which they named Foxp3. In 2001, in collaboration with Hans D. Ochs, Robert Wildin, and their teams, Ramsdell and Brunkow demonstrated that mutations in the human FOXP3 gene are found in IPEX syndrome, a rare autoimmune disease.

== Honors and awards ==
In 2017, Ramsdell received, jointly with Shimon Sakaguchi and Alexander Rudensky, the Crafoord Prize for research in polyarthritis. They were cited for "their discoveries relating to regulatory T cells, which counteract harmful immune reactions in arthritis and other autoimmune diseases".

Ramsdell was jointly awarded, with Sakaguchi and Mary E. Brunkow, the 2025 Nobel Prize in Physiology or Medicine. On the day of the announcement, he was unable to be contacted to receive his prize, as he was hiking off the grid in Idaho. Ramsdell later told the BBC that his first response when he did learn the news from his wife was "I did not!", to which she replied that she had 200 text messages suggesting otherwise. When in Sweden to receive the award, Ramsdell donated the hiking boots he was wearing when he found out he had won the Prize to the Nobel Prize Museum.
