= CancerVax Corp (defunct company) =

American pharmaceutical company

- Industry: Pharmaceutical
- Founded: 1998
- Headquarters: Delaware, USA
- Area served: North America
- Key people: Donald Morton, Ryan Davies (CEO)
- Products: Vaccines

CancerVax Corp was an American pharmaceutical company founded in 1998 by Donald Morton. The company sought to develop a vaccine for cancer, and had candidates for melanoma reach phase III clinical trials. When those trials proved unsuccessful in 2005, the company soon underwent a reverse takeover with Micromet.

== Company background ==
CancerVax was founded in Delaware by Dr. Donald Morton in 1998. Prior to the formation of the company, Dr. Morton researched at the John Wayne Cancer Institute. After discovering what would eventually become CancerVax's lead product candidate, Canvaxin, Donald left John Wayne Cancer Institute to start the company and push the drug through the clinical trials necessary in order to take a drug to the market. The company used specific mergers and joint ventures to attempt to humanize their antibodies and push their drugs through their pipeline.

== Products ==
While the company eventually had several drugs in their pipeline focused on melanoma, colon cancer, lung cancer, solid tumors, and ophthalmic disease, their lead candidate Canvaxin was focused on melanoma. Canvaxin was a vaccine based treatment for melanoma, and was an immunotherapeutic. In the clinical trials it has been proven an effective treatment, with a significantly greater (P<0.0001) median survival rate over than no treatment. Immunotherapy in its most general form for cancer treatment uses the immune system to target tumor cells. While all cells produce cytokines and have receptor proteins on the cell surface, tumor cells may over-express them. Targeted immunotherapy towards these over expressed proteins could be an effective treatment towards different cancers. There are three types of immunotherapy, and they are briefly described below

- Passive Immunotherapy: Direct administration of monoclonal antibodies targeted to a specific cell receptor or protein to inhibit a tumor function or target the tumor itself.
- Non-Specific Active Immunotherapy: A general immune system response using cytokines and other cell signaling. Since this treatment is very general it has many complicated side effects.
- Specific Active Immunotherapy: The generation of cell-mediated and antibody immune responses focused on specific antigens expressed by the cancer cells. Canvaxin is an example of this therapy.
- CAR-T cell therapy: In 2023, the company partnered with research team from the University of California, Los Angeles to develop of a universal chimeric antigen receptor (CAR) T-cell platform.

=== Canvaxin ===
CancerVax partnered with Serono and released Canvaxin in 2004; a therapeutic polyvalent cancer vaccine. It was an antigen-rich, allogeneic whole-cell vaccine developed in 1984 from three melanoma cell lines and is the most extensively studied melanoma vaccine to date. However, on October 3, 2005, CancerVax announced the discontinuation of its Phase 3 clinical trial of Canvaxin in patients with Stage III melanoma. The decision followed the recommendation of the independent Data and Safety Monitoring Board (DSMB) with oversight responsibility for the clinical trial. The DSMB decided, based upon the data reviewed at the third interim analysis, that it was unlikely that the trial would provide significant evidence of a survival benefit for Canvaxin-treated patients versus those receiving placebo. In addition, in April 2005, the companies announced the discontinuation of their other Phase 3 clinical trial of Canvaxin in patients with Stage IV melanoma based upon a similar recommendation of the independent DSMB following its review of data from the second interim analysis of this clinical trial.

The unsuccessful results of these clinical trials prompted CancerVax to say it would cut payroll by more than half to roughly 80 employees from 183. Immediately following this announcement, CancerVax's stock plunged $1.30, or 44.5%, to $1.62 and well below its 52-week low of $2.70. In less than 30 minutes after the opening bell, nearly 850,000 CancerVax shares had been traded, or more than 17 times the average daily trade for the previous three months. Shares of Serono were off 15 cents, or 0.9%, to $16.35.

== Competitive strategy ==
CancerVax Corporation's competitive strategy revolved around targeting large disease markets with significant unmet medical needs. The company was founded by Dr. Donald Morton who utilized his research on autologous cell cancer vaccines to develop a new allogeneic cellular vaccine for cancer. Dr. Morton's employment at John Wayne Cancer Institute allowed him to perform additional research on the melanoma vaccine while still holding the commercialization rights to the vaccine. The company entered in a Cross-License agreement with John Wayne Cancer Center where in funding acquired by the center from the NIH was used to conduct Phase I and Phase II clinical trials for this product. Following promising results, JWCC applied to the NCI for research funds to undertake clinical trials with the melanoma vaccine and were granted more than $34,000,000 to carry out Phase III multi-center trials with the melanoma vaccine in patients with Stage III or Stage IV melanoma. This new technology was also found to work on colon cancer and the company had plans to push forward with phase 2 trials for late-stage colon cancer.

The major advantage CancerVax enjoyed was that drug discovery was conducted at a research institute with the founder of CancerVax holding all commercialization rights to the technology that were then licensed to the company. They retained worldwide commercialization rights to Canvaxin and intended to market it through their own sales force or co-promote it in the United States while establishing strategic collaborations abroad. Manufacturing was also conducted at their own biologics manufacturing facility, with plans of expansion in 2004 and 2005 to accommodate commercial demand. In addition to Canvaxin, they planned on using the proprietary specific active immunotherapy, anti-angiogenesis and T-oligonucleotide, or telomere homolog oligonucleotide, technology platforms, as well as on human monoclonal antibody technology. In 2002, they acquired Cell-Matrix, Inc., a private company with expertise in angiogenesis. This technology was believed to complement their vaccine technology and could help develop new applications for curing other diseases using active immunotherapy and anti-angiogenesis.

== Reverse Merger ==
Three months after the poor Phase III data forced it to suspend work on Canvaxin, CancerVax agreed to team up with Micromet, a private German company, in a buyout valued at $126.7 million. Cancervax used an initial public offering (IPO) in August 2003, listing on NASDAQ at $13.00 a share. In fiscal years 2004 and 2005, Cancervax recorded net losses of $56 million and 40 million, respectively. By December, 2006, the stock price had fallen to $3.46. In May 2006, when Micromet was formally taken over by CancerVax in a reverse merger, a new NASDAQ-listed company was formed and renamed "Micromet Inc." The merger was "reversed" in that although CancerVax technically acquired Micromet, shareholders of Micromet received 67.5% of the shares of the new combined company, giving them control of the newly formed Micromet Inc. The deal allowed Micromet access to leverage CancerVax's existing U.S. public company infrastructure, and added a preclinical candidate for solid tumors to their product portfolio.

CancerVax and Micromet likely chose to enter into this reverse merger because CancerVax needed a way to rebound after the failure of Canvaxin, and Micromet needed an easy way to go public. Because of high underwriting fees and the fixed costs of going public through investment banks, it is difficult for small firms to go public via an IPO because of insufficient liquidity gains. Small, private firms, like Micromet, are less likely to find hiring an underwriter to be a positive net present value project and hence gain more benefits from going public by a reverse merger rather than an IPO.v Micromet Inc. started trading on NASDAQ on May 9, 2006, opening at $9.33 and closed at 6.54 with a volume of 40,925 shares traded. Micromet announced in 2008 that it was seeking to raise $40 million through issuing additional stock

In March 2021,CancerVAX raised a $2 million round from undisclosed investors in March 2021. They also launched a StartEngine campaign to raise funds.
