= Malcolm A. S. Moore =

British-American biologist (1944–2025)

- Born: 18 January 1944
- Died: 23 September 2025 (aged 81)
- Education: Oxford University
- Awards: William B. Coley Award (1995)
- Scientific career
- Fields: Oncology, hematology
- Workplaces: Memorial Sloan-Kettering Cancer Center

Malcolm A. S. Moore (18 January 1944 – 23 September 2025) was a British-American biologist who served as the Enid A. Haupt Chair of Cell Biology at the Memorial Sloan-Kettering Cancer Center. Moore was an oncologist and hematologist known for the purification of human Granulocyte colony-stimulating factor and for being the principal investigator in the development of Filgrastim. He was a member of various national and international societies and joined the editorial boards of a number of journals. He served or chaired committees of governmental and professional organizations, such as the Cancer Research Institute.
