= Shimon Sakaguchi =

Japanese immunologist (born 1951)

- 坂口 志文
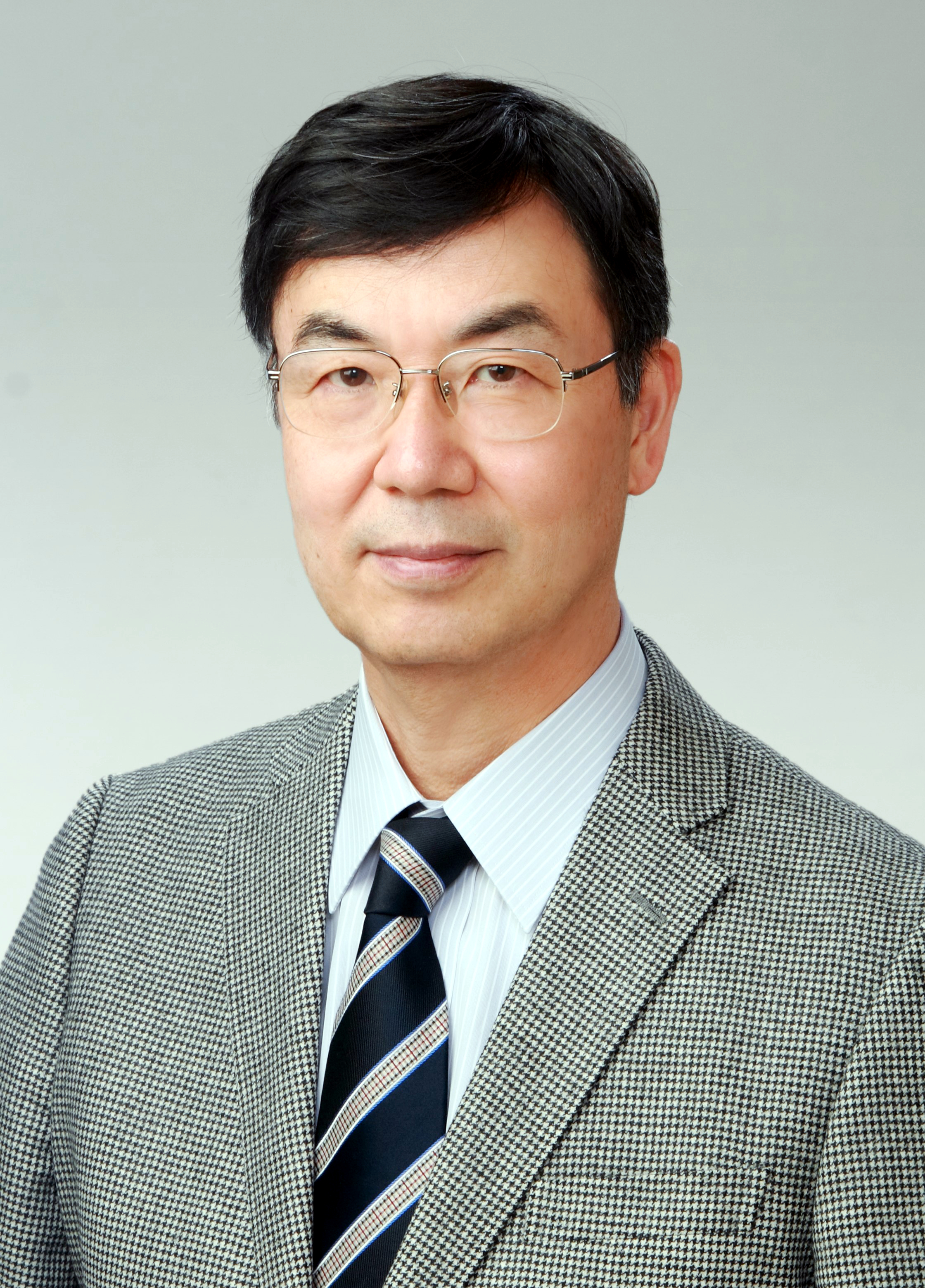
- Born: 19 January 1951 (age 75); Nagahama, Shiga, Japan
- Education: Kyoto University (MD, PhD)
- Known for: Regulatory T cells
- Awards: William B. Coley Award (2004); Canada Gairdner International Award (2015); Crafoord Prize (2017); Robert Koch Prize (2020); Nobel Prize in Physiology or Medicine (2025)
- Scientific career
- Fields: Pathology; Immunology
- Workplaces: Osaka University

Shimon Sakaguchi (坂口 志文, Sakaguchi Shimon; born 19 January 1951) is a Japanese immunologist. He is a distinguished professor at Osaka University and a professor emeritus at Kyoto University.

His work includes the discovery of regulatory T cells and describing their role in the immune system. In 2025, he was jointly awarded the Nobel Prize in Physiology or Medicine with Mary E. Brunkow and Fred Ramsdell.

== Early life and education ==
Shimon Sakaguchi was born on 19 January 1951 in Nagahama, Shiga. He received a medical degree in 1976 from the Faculty of Medicine at Kyoto University. In 1982, he also received a PhD degree from Kyoto University.

== Career ==
Sakaguchi undertook postdoctoral research in the United States at Johns Hopkins University and Stanford University from 1983 to 1987 as a Lucille P. Markey Scholar. Later, he worked as an assistant professor in the Department of Immunology at the Scripps Research Institute.

After returning to Japan in 1991, he worked at Riken as an investigator of the Japan Science and Technology Agency. Later, he became the head of the Department of Immunopathology at the Tokyo Metropolitan Institute of Gerontology. Between 1998 and 2011, he worked as a professor and chairman of the Department of Experimental Pathology at the Institute for Frontier Medical Sciences of Kyoto University. From 2007 to 2011, he also served as the institute's director. His lab was moved to Osaka University in 2011.

== Research ==
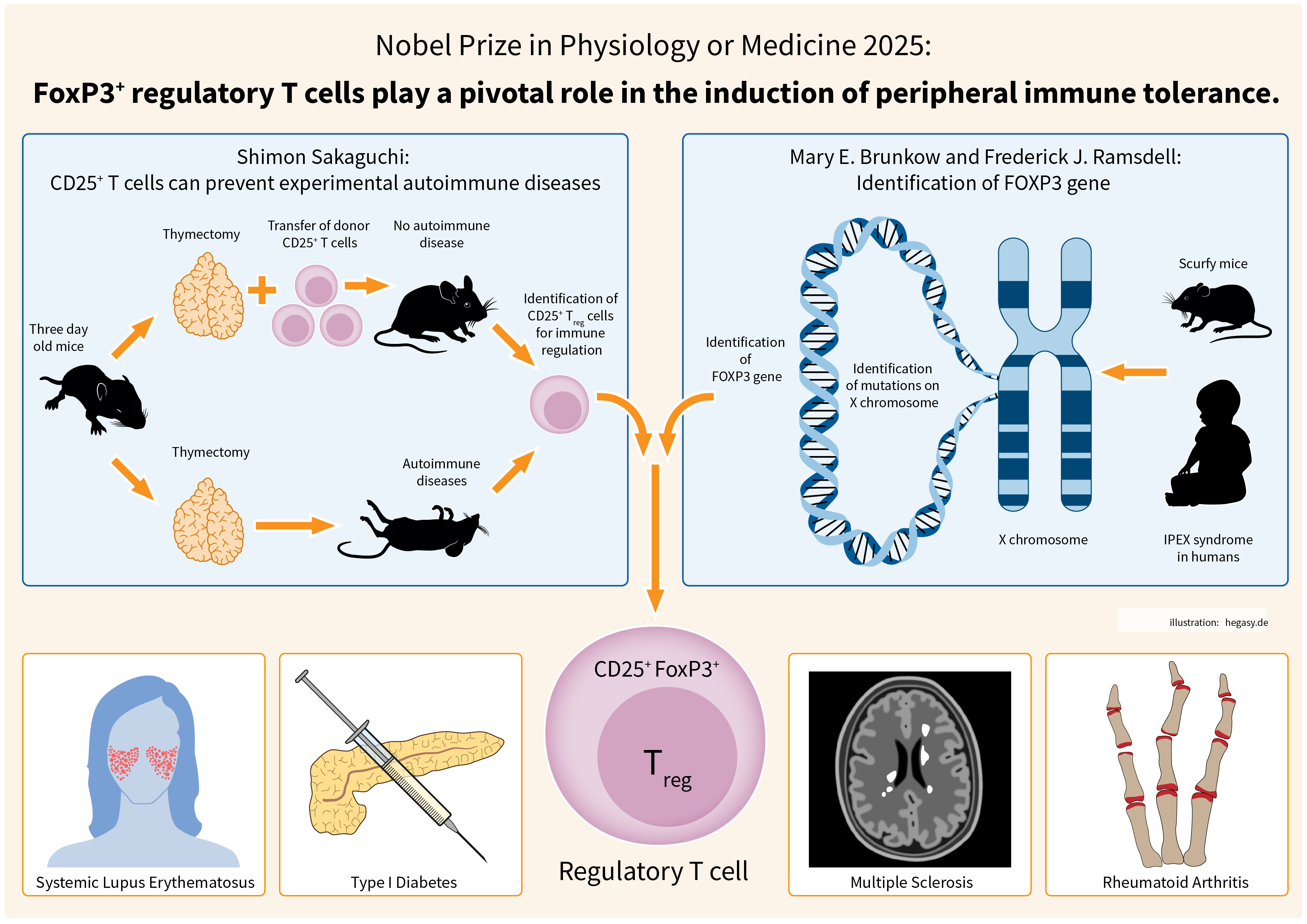
Nobel Prize in Physiology or Medicine 2025: Pivotal role of FoxP3^{+} T_{reg} cells in peripheral immune tolerance

In a 1995 study, Sakaguchi and his colleagues showed the existence of regulatory T cells, a previously unknown subset of T cells expressing CD4 and CD25 that modulate the immune system and help maintain immune tolerance. They injected BALB/c athymic mice with a suspension of CD4^{+} cells previously depleted of CD25^{+} cells and found that the mice subsequently developed autoimmune diseases (e.g. thyroiditis and gastritis). However, reconstitution of CD4^{+}CD25^{+} cells shortly after the initial injection of CD4^{+}CD25^{−} cells prevented the development of autoimmunity. In 2003, Sakaguchi's group demonstrated the importance of FOXP3 in the development and function of regulatory T cells.

== Honours and awards ==
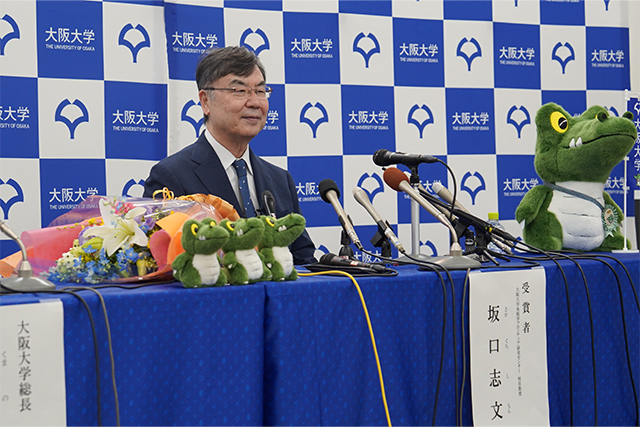
Sakaguchi attended a press conference at the University of Osaka after the Nobel Prize laureates were announced on October 2, 2025

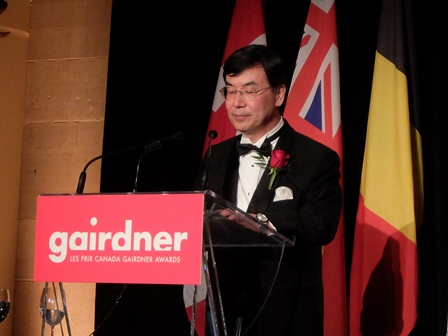
Sakaguchi addressed at Canada Gairdner International Award Ceremony at the Royal Ontario Museum on 29 October 2015

On 6 October 2025, Sakaguchi was awarded the Nobel Prize in Physiology or Medicine with Mary E. Brunkow and Fred Ramsdell "for their discoveries concerning peripheral immune tolerance."

- 2004: William B. Coley Award (with Ethan M. Shevach)
- 2008: Keio Medical Science Prize (with Fred Gage)
- 2009: Medal of Honor with Purple Ribbon (Japan)
- 2011: Asahi Prize
- 2012: Foreign associate of the National Academy of Sciences
- 2015: Chunichi Culture Award
- 2015: Canada Gairdner International Award
- 2016, 2018, 2021: Asian Scientist 100, Asian Scientist
- 2015: Clarivate Citation laureates in Physiology or Medicine (with Shevach and Alexander Rudensky)
- 2017: Crafoord Prize (with Ramsdell and Rudensky)
- 2017: Person of Cultural Merit (Japan)
- 2017: Momofuku Ando Prize
- 2019: Order of Culture (Japan)
- 2020: Paul Ehrlich and Ludwig Darmstaedter Prize
- 2020: Robert Koch Prize
- 2023: Debrecen Award for Molecular Medicine
- 2025: Nobel Prize in Physiology or Medicine (with Brunkow and Ramsdell)
