= Peter Alfred Gorer =

- Born: 14 April 1907; London, England
- Died: 1961 (aged 54)
- Education: Charterhouse School, Guy's Hospital, University College London
- Known for: Co-discovery of histocompatibility antigens and their genetic regulation
- Awards: Fellow of the Royal Society (1960), Cancer Research Institute William B. Coley Award (1975)
- Scientific career
- Fields: Immunology, Pathology, Genetics
- Institutions: Guy's Hospital, University College London, Lister Institute

Peter Alfred Gorer FRS (14 April 1907 in London – 1961) was a British immunologist, pathologist and geneticist who pioneered the field of transplant immunology.

Peter Gorer was born in London to Edgar (drowned in the 1915 sinking of RMS Lusitania) and Rachel née Cohen Gorer. He died of lung cancer in 1961.

== Education and work institutions ==
He was educated at Charterhouse. He graduated from Guy's Hospital, London in 1929 and then studied genetics under J.B.S. Haldane at University College, London. From 1933 to 1940 Gorer worked at the Lister Institute before returning to Guy's Hospital to work as a pathologist.

== Research ==
Gorer is credited with the co-discovery of histocompatibility antigens and the elucidation of their genetic regulation. Together with George Snell, he helped discover the murine histocompatibility 2 locus, or H-2, which is analogous to the human leukocyte antigen. Gorer also identified antigen II and determined its role in transplant tissue rejection.

== Awards ==
- Elected a Fellow of the Royal Society in 1960.
- 1975 Cancer Research Institute William B. Coley Award

== See also ==
- C.C. Little
- Major histocompatibility complex
