= Veit Hornung =

German immunologist (born 1976)

- Education: LMU Munich (MD)
- Known for: Innate immune sensing of nucleic acids; cGAS–STING pathway; inflammasome activation
- Awards: Gottfried Wilhelm Leibniz Prize (2018)
- Scientific career
- Fields: Immunology, Innate Immunity
- Workplaces: LMU Munich; Max Planck Institute of Biochemistry
- Website: https://www.genzentrum.uni-muenchen.de/research-groups/hornung/group-members/veit-hornung/index.html LMU Gene Center – Hornung Group

Veit Hornung (born 15 April 1976) is a German immunologist whose research has helped advance the understanding of how the innate immune system recognises pathogenic nucleic acids and triggers inflammatory responses. He holds the Chair of Immunobiochemistry at the Gene Center of LMU Munich, and is a research group leader at the Max Planck Institute of Biochemistry. His work includes studies on cytosolic DNA and RNA sensors, the cGAS–STING pathway, and the connection of nucleic-acid sensing to inflammasome activation. In recognition of his contributions he received the Gottfried Wilhelm Leibniz Prize in 2018.

== Early life and education ==
Hornung studied medicine at LMU Munich from 1996 to 2003, including rotations at Harvard University and the University of Zurich. He obtained his doctorate (Dr. med.) in 2004, with a thesis in the Division of Clinical Pharmacology at LMU. He then conducted post-doctoral research at LMU (2003–2006) and at the University of Massachusetts Medical School in Worcester, USA (2006–2008) in the laboratories of Eicke Latz and Kate Fitzgerald.

== Research and career ==
From 2008 to 2013, Hornung was Professor of Clinical Biochemistry at the Institute for Clinical Chemistry and Clinical Pharmacology, University Hospital, University of Bonn. In 2014–2015 he served as Director of the Institute of Molecular Medicine at the University Hospital, University of Bonn. In 2015 he was appointed Chair of Immunobiochemistry at LMU Munich, where he leads a research group investigating molecular mechanisms of inflammation. Since November 2017 he also heads a research group “Molecular Mechanisms of Inflammation” at the Max Planck Institute of Biochemistry, Martinsried, as a Max Planck Fellow. His laboratory investigates how the innate immune system discriminates non-self nucleic acids (DNA, RNA) from self, focusing on pattern recognition receptors (PRRs), the cGAS–STING pathway, inflammasome activation (notably NLRP3) and their role in infection, sterile inflammation and disease.

== Major contributions ==
Hornung's team contributed to identifying how cytosolic DNA sensors activate the innate immune system and found that a STING-initiated cell-death program feeds into NLRP3 inflammasome activation in human myeloid cells. His work described how cGAS synthesises a cyclic dinucleotide second messenger that activates STING, thereby triggering interferon responses, and showed that in human myeloid cells cytosolic DNA sensing via STING can lead to NLRP3 inflammasome activation (with AIM2 being dispensable in that context). His research has translational relevance for viral infections and inflammatory diseases.

== Awards and honours ==
- Member of the German National Academy of Sciences Leopoldina (2016)
- Gottfried Wilhelm Leibniz Prize, German Research Foundation (DFG), 2018.
- Liliane Bettencourt Prize for Life Sciences, 2018.
- William B. Coley Award for Distinguished Research in Basic and Tumor Immunology, 2020.
- Louis-Jeantet Prize for Medicine for Translational Medicine, 2025.
- Recognised as a Highly Cited Researcher (Clarivate Analytics).

== Selected publications ==
- Gaidt MM, Ebert TS, Chauhan D, Ramshorn K, Pinci F, Zuber S, O’Duill F, Schmid-Burgk JL, Hoss F, Buhmann R, Wittmann G, Latz E, Subklewe M, Hornung V. The DNA Inflammasome in Human Myeloid Cells Is Initiated by a STING-Cell Death Program Upstream of NLRP3. Cell. 2017;171(5):1110–1124.e18. doi:10.1016/j.cell.2017.09.039.
- Ablasser A, Goldeck M, Cavlar T, Deimling T, Witte G, Rohl I, Hopfner KP, Ludwig J, Hornung V. cGAS produces a 2′-5′-linked cyclic dinucleotide second messenger that activates STING. Nature. 2013;498(7454):380-384.
- Hornung V, Bauernfeind F, Halle A, Samstad EO, Kono H, Rock KL, Fitzgerald KA, Latz E. Silica crystals and aluminium salts activate the NALP3 inflammasome through phagosomal destabilization. Nat Immunol. 2008;9(8):847-856.
- Hornung V, Ablasser A, Charrel-Dennis M, Bauernfeind F, Horvath G, Caffrey DR, Latz E, Fitzgerald KA. AIM2 recognises cytosolic dsDNA and forms a caspase-1-activating inflammasome with ASC. Nature. 2009;458:514-518.
- Hornung V, Ellegast J, Kim S, Brzózka K, Jung A, Kato H, Poeck H, Akira S, Conzelmann K-K, Schlee M, Endres S, Hartmann G. 5′-Triphosphate RNA is the ligand for RIG-I. Science. 2006;314:994-997.
- Hornung V. Innate sensing of cytosolic nucleic acids and its role in health and disease. Frontiers in Immunology. (2022) Review Article.
