= Thierry Boon =

Belgian scientist

Thierry Boon is a Belgian scientist, former Director of the Ludwig Cancer Research branch in (Belgium) and professor at the Université Catholique de Louvain. He observed that tumour cells that have acquired new mutations as a result of mutagen treatment in vitro, often become incapable of forming tumours because they express new antigens recognized by the T cells of the immune system. His research allowed him to isolate the genes that code for these so-called tumour antigens. He is a member of the Cancer Research Institute Scientific Advisory Council, The National Academy of Sciences, and The Academy of Cancer Immunology.

== Awards ==
- 1986: Rik & Nel Wouters Prize
- 1986: De Vooght Prize in Immunology
- 1987: Cancer Research Institute William B. Coley Award
- 1990: Dr. Josef Steiner Cancer Research Prize
- 1990: Francqui Prize on Biological and Medical Sciences
- 1994: Louis-Jeantet Prize for Medicine
- 1994: Rabbi Shai Shacknai Memorial Prize in Immunology & Cancer Research
- 1995: Sandoz Prize in Immunology
- 1999: Leopold Griffuel Prize
