= Shizuo Akira =

Japanese immunologist

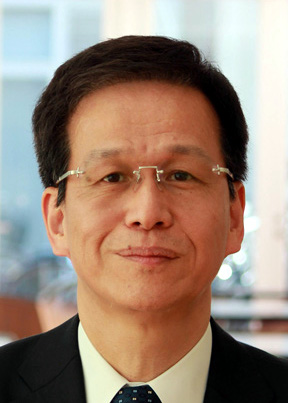
- Shizuo Akira
- Born: January 27, 1953 (age 73); Higashiōsaka
- Education: Osaka University
- Known for: Toll-like receptors
- Awards: William B. Coley Award (2006); Imperial Prize (2007); Japan Academy Prize (2007); Keio Medical Science Prize (2010); Canada Gairdner International Award (2011); Robert Koch Prize (2014); Japan Prize (2026)
- Scientific career
- Fields: Immunology;innate host defense mechanisms
- Workplaces: Department of Host Defense, Osaka University, Japan.
- Website: hostdefense.ifrec.osaka-u.ac.jp/en/

Shizuo Akira (審良 静男, Akira Shizuo) (born January 27, 1953, in Higashiōsaka) is a professor at the Department of Host Defense, Osaka University, Japan. He has made ground-breaking discoveries in the field of immunology, most significantly in the area of innate host defense mechanisms.

== Education ==
Shizuo Akira gained a M.D. in School of Medicine from Osaka University in 1977. In 1984 he earned a PhD from Osaka University. After which, he did post-doctoral research with Hitoshi Sakano at the University of California, Berkeley until 1987.

== Research ==
Besides being one of the world's most-cited scientists, he has also been recognised, in the years 2006 and 2007, for having published the greatest number of ‘Hot Papers’ (11 papers) over the preceding two years. He is the recipient of several international awards, including the Gairdner Foundation International Award (2011), Robert Koch Prize, the Milstein Award (2007), and the William B. Coley Award.

Among his greatest discoveries is the demonstration, through the ablation of toll-like receptor (TLR)s genes, that TLRs recognize a discrete collection of molecules of microbial origin, and later the RNA helicases, RIG-I (retinoic-acid-inducible protein I) and MDA5 (melanoma differentiation-associated protein 5). All molecules belong to the pattern recognition receptors, which detects intruding pathogens and initiates antimicrobial responses in the host.

== Career history ==
- Clinical Training and Physician (1977–1980)
- Research Fellow, University of California, Berkeley (1985–1987)
- Research Associate (1987–1995), Associate Professor (1995), Institute for Molecular and Cellular Biology, Osaka University
- Professor, Hyogo College of Medicine (1996–1999)
- Professor, Research Institute for Microbial Diseases, Osaka University (1999–7'0)
- Center Director, Osaka University Immunology Frontier Research Center (2007–present)

== Recognition ==
- 2000 Inoue Prize for Science (Inoue Foundation of Science)
- 2001 Hideyo Noguchi Prize (Osaka Science & Technology)
- 2002 Osaka Science Prize (Osaka Science & Technology)
- 2003 Takeda Medical Prize (Takeda Science Foundation)
- 2004 Prize of Princess Takamatsu Cancer Research Fund
- 2004 Robert Koch Prize (Robert Koch Foundation, Germany)
- 2005 The Emperor's Purple Ribbon Medal (Japanese Cabinet Office)
- 2006 Asahi Prize (Asahi Shinbun)
- 2006 William B. Coley Award (Cancer Research Institute, United States)
- 2007 "Hottest Researcher" Thompson Scientific Research Award
- 2007 Uehara Prize (Uehara Memorial Foundation)
- 2007 Imperial Prize and Japan Academy Prize (academics) (Japan Academy)
- 2007 Milstein Award (International Society for Interferon and Cytokine Research)
- 2007 Dunham lecture at Harvard University
- 2007 Doctor of Medical Science at Technical University of Munich
- 2008 Dyer Lecture (National Institute of Health)
- 2009 Marsh Lecture (Feinstein Institutes for Medical Research)
- 2009 Lacey Lecture (Washington University in St. Louis)
- 2009 Foreign associate, National Academy of Sciences
- 2009 Person of Cultural Merit (Japanese Government)
- 2009 Hans Bloemendal Medal (University of Nijmegen, Netherland)
- 2010 Avery-Landsteiner Prize (German Society for Immunology)
- 2010 Keio Medical Science Prize
- 2010 Lifetime honorary member (International Endotoxin and Innate Immunity Society)
- 2011 The Canada Gairdner International Award
- 2016 Semantic Scholar AI program ranked Akira as #4 on its list of most influential biomedical researchers.
- 2026 Japan Prize in the field of "Life Sciences".

== Missing and rescued ==
In July 2021, Akira went missing while climbing Kannon peak in Tenkawa, Nara Prefecture, on his own. He was found and rescued by police with the help of a police dog.
