= Cornelis Melief =

Dutch immunologist (born 1943)

Cornelis Joseph Maria Melief (born 20 January 1943) is a Dutch immunologuist specialising in cancer immunology and immunotherapy, with a focus on therapeutic cancer vaccines. He is emeritus Professor, former head of the Department of Immunohematology and Blood Transfusion at the Leiden University Medical Center, and Chief Scientific Officer at ISA Therapeutics in Netherlands. He is known for his work in the field of cancer immunology, devising new cancer therapies based on the activation of the patient's own immune system.

== Early life and education ==
He grew up in the South of the Netherlands, in the town of Zevenbergschen Hoek and from 11 years of age onwards in Amsterdam. He received his PhD Doctorate in Medicine in 1967 from the University of Amsterdam, followed by a Medical Doctor degree in 1970 from the same university. In 1973 and 1974 he was a postdoctoral fellow at the New England Medical Center and Dana-Farber Cancer Institute in Boston.

From 1970 to 1972, Melief served as an MD Lieutenant as part of compulsory Army conscription in the Netherlands.

== Career ==
In 1975, he joined the Netherlands Red Cross Blood Transfusion Service, as Head of Department of cell-mediated immunology. From 1975 to 1985 he became a scientific staff member of the CLB Amsterdam. In 1976, Melief was made head of the new Department of Experimental Tumour Immunology which in 1982 was renamed the Department of Cellular Immunology.

From 1985 to 1991, he worked as the Head of the Division of Immunology at the Netherlands Cancer Institute in Amsterdam. In 1991, he became head of the Department of Immunohematology and blood transfusion at Leiden University Medical Center. In 2004 he co-founded and became Chief Scientific Officer at the Biotech company Immune System Activation (ISA) Pharmaceuticals

Since 2012, Melief has been the CSO of ISA Pharmaceuticals and emeritus Professor at Leiden University Medical Center.

=== Major accomplishments ===
He is author of more than 550 peer-reviewed publications, cited over 71,000 times and inventor on more than 30 patents and patent applications.

Major patents include:

- 2003- Induction of anti-tumor CTL immunity through in vivo triggering of 4-1BB and/or CD40
- 2007 - Long peptides of 22-45 amino acid residues that induce and/or enhance antigen specific immune responses

Major publications include:

- 1998 - Published T-cell help for cytotoxic T lymphocytes is mediated by CD40–CD40L interactions which was a breakthrough in the understanding of the importance of helper T-cells in priming cytotoxic T lymphocytes.
- 2009 - Published that therapeutic vaccination with long peptides caused complete or partial regression of premalignant lesions caused by human papilloma virus type 16 (HPV16).
- 2020 – Published that strong vaccine responses against HPV16 oncogenic proteins in patients with late stage cervical cancer during chemotherapy are associated with prolonged survival.

=== Memberships ===
- Chairman of the Dutch Society for Immunology from 2001 to 2008.
- Member of the Scientific Advisory Board of NCT, a Translational and Clinical Oncology Center of excellence of the German Cancer Institute (Deutsches Krebs Forschungs Zentrum) in Heidelberg and the Comprehensive Cancer Center of University of Dresden from 2015 to present.
- Member of the American Association for Cancer Research
- Member of the Royal Netherlands Academy of Arts and Sciences (KNAW) (2002)
- Member of the Hollandsche Maatschappij van Wetenschappen
- Member of European Society for Medical Oncology (ESMO)
- Member of European Academy of Cancer Immunology

=== Awards and honours ===
- SOFI Prize Leiden in 1986
- AkzoNobel Prize in 1995
- European Federation of Immunological Societies Lecture Award in 2007
- Ceppellini Lecture from the European Federation for Immunogenetics in 2009 (as Cornelisees Melief)
- William B. Coley Award from the Cancer Research Institute in 2009
- Queen Wilhelmina Research Prize from the Dutch Cancer Society in 2010
- Cancer Immunotherapy (CIMT) organization, Mainz Germany. Lifetime Achievement Award 2017
- Honorary doctorate Mainz University, Germany, 2017
- 2018 ESMO Immuno-Oncology Award in recognition of his work studying the interactions of the immune system with cancer
- 2019 AACR-CRI Lloyd J. Old Award in Cancer Immunology
- Pedro J.Romero Service to JITC Award, 2022
- 2022 Election as Fellow of the Academy of Immuno-Oncology by the Society for Immunotherapy of Cancer (SITC)
