= Alvaro Morales (urologist) =

Colombian-Canadian urologist and surgeon

Dr. Alvaro Morales, MD, FRCSC CC is a Colombian-Canadian urologist, surgeon and Member of the Order of Canada who is noted for his work in the fields of cancer research and testosterone deficiency. He is particularly known for his pioneering work using Bacillus Calmette–Guérin (BCG) to treat bladder cancer, the first proven immunotherapy for cancer. A 2018 article in the Canadian Urological Association Journal said Morales' cancer research "changed the course of urology" and described him as a "living legend."

== BCG Immunotherapy ==
In the 1970s, while working in the Department of Urology at Queen's University in Kingston, Ontario, Canada, Morales developed a hypothesis considering the use of BCG, a live tuberculosis vaccine, to treat non muscle invasive urothelial bladder cancer (NMIBC). His initial request for research funding from the National Cancer Institute of Canada was rejected with the note that "BCG is not only ineffective and dangerous but a throwback to the stone age of tumor immunology."

Eventually developed with funding from the Cancer Research Institute of New York, the therapy involved introducing BCG to infect the bladder, provoking an immune system response sufficiently robust to eliminate some tumors without the use of chemicals.

BCG immunotherapy was found to be effective in up to 2/3 of superficial tumors, and in randomized trials has been shown to be superior to standard chemotherapy. In 1990, the treatment became the first therapy approved for use by the FDA against solid NMIBC tumors and remains the "gold standard" treatment more than 40 years later. In 2018, BCG was described in the Canadian Urological Association Journal as "the most effective, and longest continually used immunotherapy for any cancer."

Morales' research on the treatment, published in 1976, has been described as "the seminal paper on the use of intravesical BCG in human patients" and was hailed by the Journal of Urology as one of the most important papers on bladder cancer research in the past 100 years.

== Medical and Academic Career ==
Morales joined the Department of Urology at Queen's University in 1973 and served as head of the department from 1982 until his resignation in 1997. He retired from Queen's University in 2004 and founded the university's Centre for Applied Urological Research in 2005. He retired from the medical profession in 2011.

== Awards and recognition ==
=== Boards and societies ===
He is an honorary member of the U.S. National Academy of Medicine, the Colombian Urological Association and Mexican Urological Society.

=== Awards ===
Over the course of his career, Morales has received numerous awards for his medical research and contributions to the fields of oncology and andrology. These have included:

- Queen Elizabeth II Diamond Jubilee Medal, 2012
- American Urological Association Hugh Hampton Young Award, 2007
- Queen Elizabeth II Golden Jubilee Medal, 2003
- Société Internationale d'Urologie and the Astellas European Foundation Award, 2002
- Société Internationale d'Urologie-Yamanouchi Award, 2002
- Canadian Urological Association Lifetime Achievement Award, 1999
- William B. Coley Award for Distinguished Research in Tumor Immunology, 1993
- American Urological Association Distinguished Contributions Award, 1991
- Dornier Innovative Research Award, American Foundation for Urological Diseases, 1991

In 2011, Morales was made a Member of the Order of Canada.
