= Clarivate Citation Laureates =

- Awarded for: Outstanding contributions in physics, chemistry, medicine, and economics
- Country: International
- Presented by: Clarivate
- Reward: Recognition
- First award: 1989
- Currently held by: Various winners (Physiology or Medicine; Physics; Chemistry; Economics)
- Website: Hall of Citation Laureates

Clarivate Citation Laureates, formerly Thomson Reuters Citation Laureates, is a list of candidates considered likely to win the Nobel Prize in their respective field. The candidates are so named based on the citation impact of their published research. The list of awardees is announced annually prior to the Nobel Prize ceremonies of that year. In October 2016, Thomson Reuters Intellectual Property and Science Business was acquired by Onex and Baring Asia and the newly independent company was named as Clarivate.

Thomson Reuters Citation Laureates was established in 1989. The list pertains to likely Nobel Prize winners in medicine, chemistry, physics, and economics. There appears to be a correlation between high citation rates for a published researcher and the award of prestigious accolades. Furthermore, citation rates disclose researchers furnishing instrumental contributions that advance the science of their respective field. Finally, choosing one tenth of one percent (0.1%) of the highest impact papers winnows the analysis to the topics and people most likely to be selected by Nobel selection committee.

However, the selection process of the Nobel selection committee is more complex than the above. At least one from the list of Thomson Reuters Citation Laureates has won a Nobel Prize each year since 1989, except for 1993 and 1996. From 2002 to 2017, 43 Nobel Prize winners were produced from 300 Thomson Reuters Citation Laureates. As of October 2022, 71 of the 396 named scientists later actually won a Nobel Prize.

The Thomson Reuters list are researchers who have been cited often in the previous two or more decades, "write multiple high-impact reports, and do so over many years."

== See also ==
- ISI Highly Cited
