= William Coley =

American surgeon and cancer researcher

William Bradley Coley
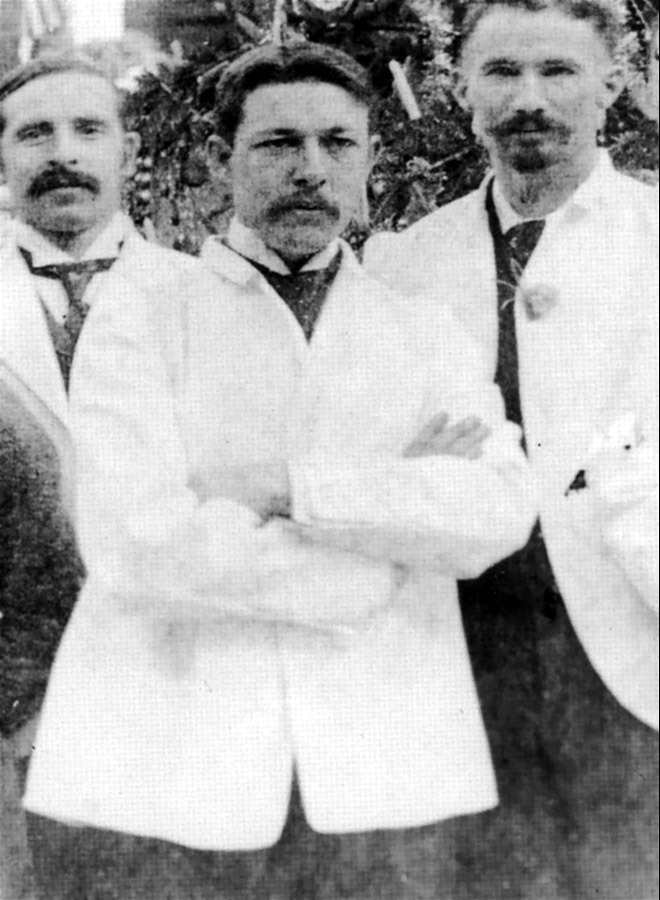
- Born: January 12, 1862; Westfield, Connecticut, U.S.
- Died: April 16, 1936 (aged 74); New York City, U.S.
- Education: Yale University, Harvard Medical School, Weill Cornell Medical Center
- Occupation: Surgeon
- Known for: Cancer immunotherapy
- Parent(s): Horace Bradley Coley; Clarina B. Wakeman

William Bradley Coley (January 12, 1862 – April 16, 1936) was an American bone surgeon and cancer researcher best known for his early contributions to the study of cancer immunotherapy, specifically causing infection as a way to fight cancer, a practice used as far back as 1550 BC. Coley is recognized as the Father of Cancer Immunotherapy for his contributions to the science.

== Early life and education ==
William Coley was born on January 12, 1862, in Saugatuck, a neighborhood of Westport, Connecticut. His parents were Horace Bradley Coley and Clarina B. Wakeman. He received his bachelor's degree in Classics from Yale University and his medical degree from Harvard Medical School in 1888. After his schooling, Coley began working at New York Hospital, now Weill Cornell Medical Center, as a surgical intern.

== Career ==
=== Early sarcoma patients ===
In 1890, Coley began his first year of private practice at New York Hospital and met Elizabeth (Bessie) Dashiell, a 17-year-old patient who would later go on to inspire Coley to search for better methods of treating sarcoma. Dashiell visited Coley after suffering from a hand injury which he soon discovered to be an aggressive bone tumor. Treatment for sarcoma at the time was scarce; the most widely accepted form of treatment was a complete amputation of the affected limb. Despite receiving such a critical surgery as forearm amputation, Bessie died just ten weeks later due to widespread metastasis of the original cancer. Bessie's death had a profound effect on Coley's approach to practicing medicine. Coley was distressed that even modern medicine's customary procedure still could not save the life of one of his first patients. Coley then decided to take the search for new possible treatments into his own hands, soon becoming one of the medical community's model clinician-scientists.

=== A clinician-scientist at work ===
After the death of Bessie Dashiell, Coley decided to review and research similar cases of sarcoma in the medical files at New York Hospital, where he found a case of interest involving a patient, a German immigrant named Fred Stein, with an inoperable tumor in his neck. To the astonishment of the doctors in the hospital at the time, Stein's round cell sarcoma seemingly vanished after being diagnosed with erysipelas, a skin infection now known to be caused by the bacterium Streptococcus pyogenes. Curious to discover the reason for the man's remission, Coley decided to search for the hospital's discharged patient, whom he eventually found in Manhattan with no trace of cancer left in his body.

=== Development of Coley's toxins ===
After months of research devoted to finding the connection between cancerous patients developing infections and their own remission, Coley decided to pursue his notion that such recoveries, considered miraculous at the time, were provoked by an immune response in the body's immune system. In 1891, he began his experiments on a patient named Zola, an Italian immigrant and drug-addict with a life-threatening tumor which he described as "the size of a small hen's egg" in Zola's right tonsil. Hoping to spawn a similar case of remission that he had been studying for the past year, Coley attempted to induce a response by Zola's immune system by injecting Streptococcus, a bacterium known to induce erysipelas attacks, directly into his tumor. Five months and several trials of injection later, Zola finally developed full-blown erysipelas infection. The tumor once thought to be irreversible then began to dissolve, disappearing within two weeks. Zola recovered and lived another eight years, before eventually succumbing to a recurrence of the tumour

Two years after Zola's initial treatment, Coley treated ten more of his own patients with the same live Streptococcus bacteria. Because of the unpredictable nature of infection, which killed patients of his on two separate occasions, Coley changed the bacterial ingredients of what would be coined Coley's toxins from the live Streptococcus bacteria, to two dead bacteria, Streptococcus pyogenes and Serratia marcescens. The formula change to the use of dead bacteria drastically reduced the risk of death in patients; however, Coley's toxins still remained controversial in the medical community.

From its creation in 1893, to 1962 with the introduction of the Kefauver Harris Amendment, Coley's toxins were being used to treat several types of cancers around the world. In the United States, it was exclusively sourced by Parke-Davis, America's oldest and largest drug maker at the time. The passing of the 1962 Kefauver Harris Amendment, however, required Coley's toxins to be labeled as a "new drug" by the Food and Drug Administration. It was this final blow to Coley's life work that drastically reduced the use of the concoction for cancer treatment. Since its changed status under the FDA, it has only been able to be prescribed through experimental clinical trials, which have continuously produced mixed results.

There is no good evidence that Coley's toxins have any benefit in cancer treatment, and their use as an adjunct or replacement for established treatment risks serious harm. According to Cancer Research UK's current statement regarding Coley's toxins, people with cancer who participate in the Coley's immunotherapy alongside conventional cancer treatments, or who use it as a substitute for those treatments, risk seriously harming their health. is contemporary critics cited the dangerous and unpredictable effects, predominantly the fever caused by the bacteria, that the vaccine had upon individuals weakened by cancer. Furthermore, the vaccine had to be made to a patient's exact needs, making it more labour-intensive, time-consuming and expensive. Thus, the Coley's vaccine soon became obsolete due to the adoption of radiation technology in cancer treatment.

=== Emergence and popularity of radiation therapy ===
Although Coley claimed successful treatment of hundreds of patients with his toxin, the absence of proven benefit or reproducibility led to broader emphasis on surgery and on the newly developing field of radiation therapy. Indeed, by 1901, the development of x-rays as a cancer treatment showed great promise. In particular, the therapy resulted in immediate tumor destruction and pain relief. Coley had arranged for a wealthy friend to provide funds to purchase two x-ray machines for his use. However, after several years of experience, Coley came to the conclusion that the effect of that primitive x-ray therapy in the untrained hands of experimenters was localized, temporary, and not curative. The scientific majority disagreed, most notably his contemporary James Ewing.

== Legacy ==
The historical results of Coley's vaccine therapy are difficult to compare with modern results because Coley's studies were not well controlled or adequately documented. Many of his patients had also received other treatments, like radiation or surgery, simultaneously with his vaccine. According to the analyses of Coley Nauts and Starnes, treatment success correlated with length of therapy and the fevers induced by the toxins. However, the very nature of his contributions not only as a physician but as a medical researcher are still being used in the medical community to this day.

=== Creation of the Cancer Research Institute ===
Coley's daughter, Helen Coley Nauts (1907–2001), established the nonprofit Cancer Research Institute in 1953 to study her father's work in efforts to "advocate for a cancer research path that investigates harnessing the body’s immune system rather than one that seeks chemicals and radiation to attack the disease." The organization has since become a leader in funding research in immunology and tumor immunology at universities and hospitals worldwide.

=== Cancer Immunotherapy ===
While Coley's own efforts to stimulate the immune system to fight cancer showed marginal results, the field of cancer immunotherapy is now a burgeoning field within medicine. Multiple approaches exist, including reprogramming T-cells to specifically attack cancerous cells and blocking checkpoints so the immune system can more effectively attack cancerous cells. Coley is regarded as a key early influence in this field.

== Personal life and death ==
Coley married Alice Lancaster in 1891 and together they had 2 children. He died on April 16, 1936, at the age of 74 in the Hospital for the Ruptured and Crippled (now called the Hospital for Special Surgery) in New York City where he was the surgeon in chief. He was survived by his wife and children who continuously worked after his death to preserve his legacy in the field of cancer research.

== See also ==
- William B. Coley Award
- Timeline of immunology
