= Giorgio Trinchieri =

Italian-American immunologist and cancer researcher

- Born: Giorgio Trinchieri; Italy
- Known for: Discovery of Interleukin-12 (IL-12)
- Awards: NIH Distinguished Investigator (2016); National Academy of Sciences (2024)
- Scientific career
- Fields: Immunology, Cancer immunology
- Institutions: National Cancer Institute; Center for Cancer Research

Giorgio Trinchieri is an Italian-American immunologist and Senior Investigator at the National Cancer Institute (NCI), where he serves as Chief of the Laboratory of Integrative Cancer Immunology within the Center for Cancer Research. He was named an NIH Distinguished Investigator in 2016 and elected to the National Academy of Sciences in 2024.

Trinchieri is recognized for discovering interleukin-12 (IL-12) in 1989, a breakthrough that revealed regulatory links between innate and adaptive immunity. His current research examines how inflammation, the microbiome, and immune responses influence cancer development and treatment outcomes.

== Education and early career ==
Trinchieri earned his medical degree from the University of Turin in Italy. Rather than pursuing clinical practice, he chose to focus exclusively on biomedical research. His early work concentrated on understanding the fundamental mechanisms by which the immune system recognizes and responds to pathogens and tumor cells.

Before joining NCI, Trinchieri held positions at the Wistar Institute in Philadelphia, where he conducted his groundbreaking work on IL-12, and later served as Director of the Schering-Plough Laboratory for Immunological Research in Dardilly, France. He also worked as an NIH Fogarty Scholar at the Laboratory for Parasitic Diseases within the National Institute of Allergy and Infectious Diseases (NIAID).

== Discovery of interleukin-12 ==
While working at the Wistar Institute in Philadelphia during the late 1980s, Trinchieri and his team were investigating how to grow and activate natural killer cells in laboratory cultures. They discovered that certain immortalized B cells produced a factor that stimulated NK cell growth and activity.

Through systematic purification efforts, the team identified a previously unknown protein composed of two subunits. This heterodimeric molecule, which they initially called "natural killer cell stimulatory factor," became the first heterodimeric cytokine to be characterized. The team published their discovery in The Journal of Experimental Medicine in September 1989. The molecule was subsequently renamed interleukin-12.

IL-12 proved to have multiple functions beyond NK cell activation, including inducing interferon-gamma production and bridging innate and adaptive immune responses. This discovery earned Trinchieri the 1996 William B. Coley Award for Distinguished Research in Basic and Tumor Immunology from the Cancer Research Institute.

Antibodies developed against IL-12 during Trinchieri's research later formed the basis for treatments of psoriasis, psoriatic arthritis, and inflammatory bowel disease.

== Research at the National Cancer Institute ==
Trinchieri joined the NCI's Center for Cancer Research in August 2006 as a Senior Investigator. As Chief of the Laboratory of Integrative Cancer Immunology, he oversees research programs that form a major component of NCI's inflammation and cancer initiative.

=== Inflammation and cancer ===
His laboratory studies the complex relationship between inflammation and cancer, recognizing that inflammatory responses can either promote or suppress tumor growth depending on the specific immune cells and signaling molecules involved. The research challenges earlier simplistic models and examines how the balance of different inflammatory mediators affects cancer outcomes.

Key research areas include:

- The role of cytokines and interferons in regulating immune responses to cancer
- How dendritic cells and other immune cells influence tumor development
- Mechanisms by which tumors create immunosuppressive microenvironments
- The involvement of specific inflammatory molecules (including IL-12, IL-23, IL-10, IL-17, and Toll-like receptors) in carcinogenesis

=== Microbiome and cancer therapy ===
Beginning in 2013, Trinchieri's team was among the first to investigate whether the gut microbiome influences cancer treatment effectiveness. Using germ-free mouse models, they demonstrated that animals lacking normal intestinal bacteria responded poorly to both chemotherapy and immunotherapy, suggesting that commensal microorganisms play a substantial role in treatment outcomes.

This work led to a clinical trial testing whether fecal microbiota transplantation could help patients with advanced melanoma who had not responded to immune checkpoint inhibitors. In the study, some patients who received fecal transplants from treatment responders subsequently showed responses to immunotherapy drugs. The results provided proof of concept that altering gut microbiome composition can improve immunotherapy responses, though additional research is needed to identify the specific microorganisms and biological mechanisms involved.

== Awards and honors ==
- Member, National Academy of Sciences (elected 2024)
- NIH Distinguished Investigator (2016)
- William B. Coley Award for Distinguished Research in Basic and Tumor Immunology (1996)

Trinchieri also serves on the Scientific Advisory Council of the Cancer Research Institute and on multiple grant review committees.

== Citations and impact ==
According to Google Scholar, Trinchieri's publications have been cited over 127,000 times. His work spans immunobiology and cancer biology, with particular focus on understanding how immune responses can be harnessed for therapeutic benefit.

== Selected publications ==
- Kobayashi M, Fitz L, Ryan M, Hewick RM, Clark SC, Chan S, Loudon R, Sherman F, Perussia B, Trinchieri G. (1989). "Identification and purification of natural killer cell stimulatory factor (NKSF), a cytokine with multiple biologic effects on human lymphocytes." Journal of Experimental Medicine. 170(3):827-845.
- Iida N, Dzutsev A, Stewart CA, Smith L, Bouladoux N, Weingarten RA, Molina DA, Salcedo R, Back T, Cramer S, Dai RM, Kiu H, Cardone M, Naik S, Patri AK, Wang E, Marincola FM, Frank KM, Belkaid Y, Trinchieri G, Goldszmid RS. (2013). "Commensal bacteria control cancer response to therapy by modulating the tumor microenvironment." Science. 342(6161):967-970.
- Davar D, Dzutsev AK, McCulloch JA, Rodrigues RR, Chauvin JM, Morrison RM, Deblasio RN, Menna C, Ding Q, Pagliano O, Zidi B, Zhang S, Badger JH, Vetizou M, Cole AM, Fernandes MR, Prescott S, Costa RGF, Balaji AK, Morgun A, Vujkovic-Cvijin I, Wang H, Borhani AA, Schwartz MB, Dubner HM, Ernst SJ, Rose A, Najjar YG, Belkaid Y, Kirkwood JM, Trinchieri G, Zarour HM. (2021). "Fecal microbiota transplant overcomes resistance to anti-PD-1 therapy in melanoma patients." Science. 371(6529):595-602.
