= Donald Morton =

American oncologist (1934–2014)

- Born: September 12, 1934; Richwood, West Virginia, U.S.
- Died: January 10, 2014 (aged 79); Santa Monica, California, U.S.
- Education: University of California, Berkeley; University of California, San Francisco
- Known for: Sentinel lymph node
- Awards: William B. Coley Award (1975); Jacobson Innovation Award (2008)
- Scientific career
- Fields: Oncology
- Workplaces: National Cancer Institute; John Wayne Cancer Institute

Donald Lee Morton (September 12, 1934 – January 10, 2014) was an American surgical oncologist who was best known for developing sentinel lymph node evaluation, a procedure that, by some estimates, saves the U.S. healthcare system nearly $4 billion annually in the treatment of melanoma and breast cancer. At the time of his death, he was Chief of the melanoma program and co-director of the surgical oncology fellowship program at the John Wayne Cancer Institute in Santa Monica, California, now known as Saint John’s Cancer Institute.

== Biography ==
Morton was born and raised in Richwood, West Virginia, the son of a coal miner. He grew up during the Great Depression in a home without running water or electricity. Due to his economically disadvantaged status, he was able to attend Berea College in Kentucky on a full scholarship. He ended up moving to California where he completed his undergraduate studies at the University of California, Berkeley in 1955. He then went on to earn a medical degree from the University of California, San Francisco in 1958. In 1960, he became a researcher at the National Cancer Institute, part of the National Institutes of Health in Bethesda, Maryland. He later returned to California and joined the faculty at UCLA, where he became Chief of Surgical Oncology in 1971. While at UCLA, he treated the actor John Wayne, who died of gastric cancer in 1979.

Appreciative of the care their father had received and desirous of supporting cancer research efforts, Wayne's adult children, through the John Wayne Foundation, founded the John Wayne Cancer Clinic at UCLA. Morton operated the clinic while Michael Wayne, John Wayne's eldest son, served as chair of the board until his death in 2003. In 1991, seeking more space, Morton expanded the clinic into the John Wayne Cancer Institute and affiliated with St. John's Health Center in nearby Santa Monica, California.

In 1982, his first wife, the former Wilma Miley, died in an automobile accident, leaving him to raise four teenagers. In 1989, he discovered a mole on his abdomen that turned out to be melanoma. It was caught early and successfully removed surgically. Morton spent the better part of four decades trying to develop a therapeutic vaccine for melanoma, the most lethal form of skin cancer. It is estimated that 76,000 new cases of melanoma will be diagnosed in the United States alone in 2014.

Morton was a past President of the International Sentinel Node Society, the Society of Surgical Oncology and the World Federation of Surgical Oncology Societies. In 2008 the American College of Surgeons awarded him with the Jacobson Innovations Award for his groundbreaking work in sentinel lymph node evaluation.

Morton died of heart failure at the age of 79 on January 10, 2014. He is survived by his second wife, Lorraine, whom he married in 1989; daughters Danielle Morton, Christin Kazmierczak, Laura Morton Rowe, and Diana Morton McAlpine; son Donald L. Morton Jr.; eight grandchildren; a brother, Patrick; and a sister, Carolyn Morton Karr.
