= David H. Raulet =

American immunologist

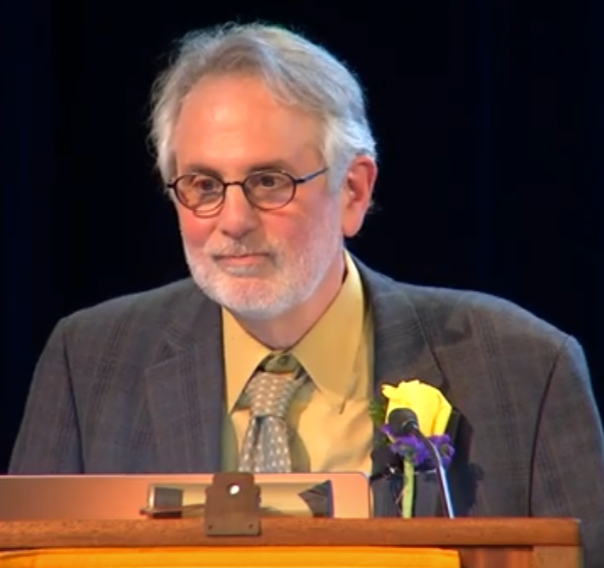
- Giving the 2022 lecture "Not All Killers Are Bad" at UC Berkeley
- Born: Buffalo, New York, US
- Education: University of Michigan; Massachusetts Institute of Technology
- Occupation: Immunologist
- Employer: University of California, Berkeley

David Henri Raulet (born June 3, 1954) is an American immunologist known for foundational contributions to the biology of natural killer (NK) cells and T lymphocytes. He is Professor of the Graduate School and Esther and Wendy Schekman Chair in Basic Cancer Biology Emeritus in the Department of Molecular and Cell Biology at the University of California, Berkeley, and serves as Faculty Director of Berkeley's Immunotherapeutics and Vaccine Research Initiative (IVRI). Raulet is a member of the United States National Academy of Sciences and a recipient of the William B. Coley Award for Distinguished Research in Tumor Immunology. Raulet is also a co-founder, with Tyler Jacks of MIT and Bill Haney, of Dragonfly Therapeutics, a biotechnology company located in the Boston area.

== Early life and education ==
Raulet was born in Buffalo, New York. He graduated from the University of Michigan with a bachelor's degree in microbiology. He then received his Ph.D. in biology from the Massachusetts Institute of Technology. Raulet went on to conduct postdoctoral research in the Department of Pathology at the Perelman School of Medicine at the University of Pennsylvania.

== Academic career ==
Raulet joined the MIT Department of Biology as an Assistant Professor in 1983 and was promoted to Associate Professor in 1987, receiving tenure in 1990. In 1991, he joined the University of California, Berkeley, where he became Professor in 1993. He served as Head of the Division of Immunology from 1997 to 2003 and later as Co-Chair of the Department of Molecular and Cell Biology from 2012 to 2016.

From 2015 to 2025, he held the Esther and Wendy Schekman Chair in Basic Cancer Biology, and in 2025 he was appointed Professor of the Graduate School and Chair Emeritus. He has directed Berkeley's Immunotherapeutics and Vaccine Research Initiative (IVRI) since 2015.

== Research ==
Raulet's research centers on the innate and adaptive immune response to cancer and viral infection, with particular emphasis on natural killer (NK) cells, gamma-delta T cells, and T lymphocytes. He has authored over 229 scientific publications.

=== Natural killer cell recognition and "missing self" ===
Raulet provided some of the earliest and most definitive genetic evidence for the "missing self" hypothesis, demonstrating that NK cells selectively kill otherwise normal cells lacking MHC class I molecules.

His work showed that MHC I-deficient cells are sufficient to trigger NK cell-mediated killing and bone marrow graft rejection. He also showed that NK cells in MHC I deficient mice exhibit impaired functional activity and that a significant percentage of NK cells in normal mice that lack inhibitory receptors for self MHC I similarly exhibit impaired function. He went on to show that NK cells require continuous interaction with self MHC I for full functional activity—a process now known as NK cell education or licensing. His later work demonstrated that NK activity varies continuously depending on the extent of steady state MHC I interactions with inhibitory receptors that NK cells happen to express, a process known as 'tuning'.

Raulet was the first to demonstrate that genes that encode the inhibitory NK cell receptors that recognize MHC I molecules are expressed in a predominantly monoallelic fashion, one of the earliest documented examples of monoallelic autosomal gene expression. Recent work from his lab provides evidence that monoallelic gene expression is characteristic of many or perhaps all genes, though the degree of monoallelic expression is rare for most genes.

=== NKG2D receptor and tumor surveillance ===
Raulet was among the first to identify ligands for the NKG2D activating receptor, including RAE-1 and H60, and demonstrated that expression of these ligands on tumor cells triggers NK-cell-mediated tumor rejection. He further showed that the DNA damage response pathway directly regulate NKG2D ligand expression, linking genomic instability in cancer to immune surveillance. His later work showed that expression of specific NKG2D ligands is also regulated by the unfolded protein stress response, and cellular hyperproliferation.

Using spontaneous mouse cancer models, his laboratory demonstrated that NKG2D-deficient animals exhibit increased susceptibility to tumor development, providing key experimental support for a role of NK cell receptors in cancer immunosurveillance.

=== STING pathway and cancer immunotherapy ===
More recent work from the Raulet laboratory developed genetic evidence that activated cGAS, which occurs spontaneously in tumor cells, activates STING in nontumor cells in the tumor microenvironment, leading to cytokine production that mobilizes NK cells against tumors. His group showed that STING agonists can induce NK cell–mediated rejection of tumors resistant to CD8 T cells, and that combination therapy with STING agonists and engineered IL-2 "superkines" produces enhanced antitumor responses by both NK cells and CD8 T cells.

=== T cell receptor development and MHC restriction ===
Earlier in his career, Raulet made major contributions to understanding T cell receptor (TCR) gene rearrangement and MHC restriction. He demonstrated that:

- CD8 T cell development requires MHC class I expression
- NKT cell development depends on MHC class I-like molecules
- TCR recognition of MHC is intrinsically encoded in germline gene segments, independent of thymic selection

== Selected scientific contributions ==
- Demonstrated by expression gene cloning that interleukin 6 can enhance primary T cell activation (1986).
- Demonstrated ordered developmental regulation of TCR gamma gene rearrangement (1985-2008)
- Provided first genetic proof that MHC I is essential for CD8 T cell development (1990)
- Established that NK cells reject normal MHC I-deficient cells (1991)
- Revealed inherent MHC bias of the pre-selection TCR repertoire (1997)
- Identified tumor-expressed NKG2D ligands and their role in NK-mediated rejection (2000–2001)
- Linked DNA damage response pathways to immune ligand induction (2005)
- Demonstrated defective tumor surveillance in NKG2D-deficient mice (2008)
- Showed STING-dependent activation of NK cells in tumor immunity (2018–2024)

== Honors and awards ==
- Graduate Assembly Distinguished Faculty Mentor Award, UC Berkeley (2025)
- Martin Meyerson Berkeley Faculty Research Lecture (2022)
- Distinguished Fellow, American Association of Immunologists (2021)
- Elected to the National Academy of Sciences (2019)
- Esther and Wendy Schekman Chair in Basic Cancer Biology (2015 to 2025)
- Distinguished Lecture, American Association of Immunologists (2012)
- William B. Coley Award for Distinguished Research in Tumor Immunology (2002)
- Fellow of the American Association for the Advancement of Science (AAAS) (2003)
- CH Li Endowed Chair, UC Berkeley (various terms)
- Cancer Research Institute Investigator Award (1986–1990)
