= Timothy A. Springer =

American immunologist

Timothy Alan Springer
- Born: February 23, 1948 (age 78); Fort Benning, Georgia
- Education: Harvard University (PhD); University of California, Berkeley (BA)
- Known for: Discovery of LFA-1 and other integrins
- Awards: Robert Koch Prize; Albert Lasker Award for Basic Medical Research; Canada Gairdner International Award; Crafoord Prize; American Society of Hematology Henry M. Stratton Medal; Biophysical Society Founders Award; Protein Society Stein & Moore Award
- Scientific career
- Fields: Immunology; Structural biology Biophysics; Biochemistry
- Workplaces: Harvard University; Boston Children's Hospital; Dana Farber Cancer Institute; University of Cambridge; MRC Laboratory of Molecular Biology
- Thesis: Detergent soluble products of HLA (1976)
- Doctoral advisor: Jack Strominger
- Website: https://timothyspringer.org

Timothy A. "Tim" Springer (born February 23, 1948) is an American biochemist, immunologist, and biophysicist known for his foundational work on cell adhesion, protein allostery, vascular biology, and immune regulation. He is the Latham Family Professor at Harvard Medical School in the Departments of Biological Chemistry and Molecular Pharmacology and of Pediatrics, and a faculty member in the Program in Cellular and Molecular Medicine and Division of Hematology at Boston Children's Hospital (BCH).

Springer is best known for discovering the first cell adhesion molecules of the immune system, the first relationships among integrins—between LFA-1 and Mac-1—and the three-step model for leukocyte emigration from the vasculature. He is also known for entrepreneurship while continuing to run an NIH-funded laboratory, for founding the Institute for Protein Innovation, and for training students and postdoctoral fellows, two of whom are in the National Academy of Sciences. In recent years, his laboratory has focused on structural and mechanobiological studies of integrins, transforming growth factor β (TGF-β), and synthetic scaffolds to zonulate organoids for regenerative medicine..

== Early life and education ==
Springer was born in Fort Benning, Georgia, in 1948. His father was a family physician. Springer attended public high school in Sacramento, California. In 1966, he enrolled at Yale University. After his freshman year, he dropped out and served as a Volunteers in Service to America (VISTA) volunteer. He did community development on the Yomba Shoshone Reservation in Nevada, including getting a road paved so children did not have to live away from home to attend high school. He then enrolled at the University of California, Berkeley, majoring in biochemistry and graduating with a BA in 1971. He went on to pursue a PhD under Jack Strominger at Harvard University, completing it in 1976.

== Career and research ==
Springer then pursued postdoctoral work on antigen-specific T lymphocyte helper factors at the University of Cambridge. Within six months, Springer failed to replicate key experiments and discovered fraudulent work, followed by a retraction. He switched to work under César Milstein at the University of Cambridge and the MRC Laboratory of Molecular Biology, soon after the development of monoclonal antibody technology. Milstein personally taught Springer how to make monoclonal antibodies, and with his first set of hybridomas in hand, Springer returned to the United States after another six months.

Before his postdoc, Springer was offered a position as Assistant Professor at Harvard Medical School by Baruj Benacerraf, the Chair of Pathology, and joined that department in 1977. He was recruited to the Dana–Farber Cancer Institute in 1981 after Benacerraf became its President, as Chief of the Laboratory of Membrane Immunochemistry, and was promoted to Associate Professor in 1983. In 1988, Springer was recruited by Fred Rosen to move his lab to and become Vice President of the Center for Blood Research. He was involved in planning its new space in the Warren Alpert Building and recruiting faculty. These included Ulrich von Andrian, Jose Carlos Gutierrez-Ramos, Rick van Etten, Anjana Rao, Denisa Wagner, and Judy Lieberman. Later, he led searches that recruited Sun Hur, Wesley Wong, and Hao Wu. Four of these recruits were subsequently elected to the National Academy of Sciences. Springer became the Latham Family Professor in 1989. In 2012, the Center for Blood Research, which had changed its name to the Immune Disease Institute, merged with Boston Children's Hospital and became the Program in Cellular and Molecular Medicine of Boston Children's Hospital.

=== Adhesion molecules of the immune system ===
Springer began his research career in immunology by studying the molecular basis for cellular immunity using as an example the interaction of cytotoxic T lymphocytes with antigen-bearing target cells. None of the molecules involved in this interaction had yet been defined, including the long postulated antigen-specific T cell receptor. However, it was known that Mg^{2+} was required for immune cell-cell interactions, and that interaction between fibroblasts and the extracellular matrix was similarly Mg^{2+}-dependent. Postulating that adhesion receptors were likely to be similar to antibodies and were unlikely to require magnesium, Springer hypothesized that other molecules must be required for antigen-specific interactions. He immunized animals with cytotoxic T lymphocytes and screened for monoclonal antibodies that blocked antigen-specific killing. Using this functional assay, his laboratory identified a set of lymphocyte function-associated (LFA) antigens required for cytotoxic T-cell-mediated killing and other T cell-dependent responses, including LFA-1 (CD11a/CD18), LFA-2 (CD2), and LFA-3 (CD58).

Springer's group then identified ICAM-1 as a ligand for LFA-1, demonstrating that this interaction is required for efficient antigen recognition by cytotoxic T cells, and later discovered ICAM-2 (CD102) and ICAM-3 (CD50), which have two to five immunoglobulin (Ig)-like domains and comprise a subfamily of the Ig superfamily. Using purified proteins on substrates including artificial lipid bilayers and flow-based adhesion assays, his lab discovered the first heterophilic (like-unlike) receptor–counter-receptor adhesion pairs in all of cell biology, including CD2–LFA-3 and LFA-1–ICAM. The LFA-1–ICAM interaction required Mg^{2+}, and explained the Mg^{2+}-dependence of cell adhesion in antigen recognition. Subsequently, Springer structurally resolved the LFA-1–ICAM-1 interaction, with Mg^{2+} at the ligand-binding interface.

=== Integrins ===
After joining Harvard Medical School, Springer discovered that one of the monoclonal antibodies he had created with Milstein was specific for a macrophage differentiation antigen he termed Mac-1. Remarkably, both Mac-1 and LFA-1 had alpha and beta subunits and their beta subunits migrated at apparently identical positions in SDS-PAGE. Cross-linking showed that each contained a single alpha and beta subunit that were non-covalently associated into heterodimers. Peptide mapping and immunological cross-reactivity showed that their beta subunits were identical and their alpha subunits were distinct. This work, published in 1982, was the first evidence for structural homology among molecules that would later be called the integrins. Knowing that LFA-1 was functionally important stimulated a search for a function for Mac-1, which was shown to be a receptor for the complement component iC3b (CR3), which had been previously defined functionally but not at the molecular level. Work with antibodies to the common β subunit led to the identification of yet another heterodimer with a distinct alpha subunit, termed αX. Thus, three heterodimers, αLβ, αMβ, and αXβ were defined. N-terminal sequencing of the αL and αM subunits showed that they were homologous, and thus had diverged from a common ancestral gene and constituted a family of related proteins. Together with previous evidence that they contained identical β-subunits, αLβ, αMβ, and αXβ, constituted a functionally important family of receptors that participated in cell-cell interactions.

Meanwhile, workers in the platelet, extracellular matrix, and cell surface fields were also working on multi-subunit receptors. The platelet receptor for fibrinogen contained two glycoprotein subunits termed IIb and IIIa. A monoclonal antibody to a cell surface receptor that blocked cell adhesion to laminin and fibronectin reacted with three distinct subunits in the same molecular weight range as αLβ, αMβ, αXβ, and IIb/IIIa. Proteins with high molecular weight, sharing a common subunit, were identified on lymphocytes and non-hematopoietic cells. After the discovery that an RGD motif in fibronectin is sufficient for recognition by its receptor and common to other extracellular proteins, the fibronectin and vitronectin receptors were isolated and their sequences determined and platelet protein IIb/IIIa was also shown to recognize RGD. Sequences of these receptors showed that their alpha subunit sequences were homologous to one another and to those earlier reported for LFA-1 (αLβ) and Mac-1 (αMβ). A large number of other papers appeared in 1986-1987 reporting further sequences and relationships among these receptors, including from the Springer lab on the β-subunit shared by LFA-1 (αLβ), Mac-1 (αMβ), and αXβ.

Richard Hynes chaired the 1987 Gordon Research Conference on Fibronectin. Hynes had worked on fibronectin, and in 1986 his group isolated a cDNA encoding a subunit recognized by an antibody to the laminin and fibronectin receptors, which he named integrin. He convened researchers from the diverse fields converging on this newly recognized family of receptors and proposed a unifying nomenclature. Springer described the first sequence relationships among family members and was the first to use an αβ nomenclature in which α subunits were named after their receptor, such as αL for LFA-1 and αM for Mac-1. However, because the meeting was focused on fibronectin, the fibronectin receptor was designated α5β1, conferring the β1 designation on the subunit that pairs with more α subunits than any other β subunit in the family. The ones discovered by Springer on white blood cells became the β2 integrins.

Contributions by Springer, Hynes, and Ruoslahti to the integrin field were recognized by the 2022 Lasker Basic Medical Research Award.

=== Integrin inside-out signaling ===
Immunologists had initially pushed back against the idea that the adhesion molecules discovered by Springer could contribute to antigen-specific recognition, as they were thought to prevent antigen-specificity. In a major conceptual advance, Dustin and Springer discovered that adhesiveness of LFA-1 on T cells is regulated. They showed that LFA-1 is inactive until other cell surface receptors are stimulated. The initial demonstration was with T cell antigen receptor stimulation and pharmacologic stimulation of protein kinases. Intracellular tyrosine kinases are downstream from the T cell receptor and receptor tyrosine kinases and G protein coupled receptors are now known to be equally effective. The process was termed “inside-out signaling” and explained how adhesion receptors can cooperate with and amplify antigen recognition without abolishing immune specificity. It occurred without any change in LFA-1 density on the cell surface, suggesting that conformational change might be involved, stimulating Springer to become a structural biologist. Some thought that binding of adaptors such as talin was sufficient for inside-out signaling. However, force transmitted by the actin cytoskeleton through adaptors to integrins that is resisted by integrin-bound ligands embedded in the extracellular environment is also required and essential for ultrasensitivity. Furthermore, all stimulators of integrin inside-out signaling stimulate actin polymerization. Integrin inside-out signaling in leukocytes and platelets correlates with large increases in actin polymerization and cellular shape changes upon activation. Most recently, ligand binding to integrins was shown to induce full conformational change within milliseconds, and to be the first step in integrin inside-out signaling.

=== LFA-1 and LFA-3–based therapeutics for autoimmune disease ===
Although Springer made the first antibodies to LFA-1 and LFA-3, he did not patent them. An antibody isolated by Hildreth and McMichael was licensed to Genentech, which was humanized and approved by the FDA in 2003 for moderate to severe psoriasis as Raptiva. Its generic name efalizumab simulate the letters F and L in LFA-1.

Springer and lab member Mike Dustin collaborated with Barbara Wallner at Biogen to clone the cDNA for LFA-3. The LFA-3 ectodomain, which contains one immunoglobulin-like domain, was fused to the Fc domain of IgG to create Amevive. Amevive was approved for moderate to severe psoriasis in 2003. Its generic name, alefacept, is a homophone of LFA plus "cept" from receptor. Royalties paid by Biogen to Dana Farber Cancer Institute were equally shared by Dustin and Springer.

=== Leukocyte adhesion deficiency and the "multistep paradigm" ===
Working with physicians seeing patients with recurring, life-threatening bacterial infections, Springer found their leukocytes lacked LFA-1 (αLβ2), Mac-1 (αMβ2), and αXβ2. Anderson and Springer named the disease leukocyte adhesion deficiency (LAD) in a review article, and it was shown to be caused by mutations in the β2 subunit common to the leukocyte integrins. Patients have abnormally high levels of neutrophils in their circulation, which cannot emigrate out of the bloodstream to fight infection. This demonstrated that β2 integrins were important in leukocyte interactions with vascular endothelial cells and stimulated Springer to set up work in the lab on endothelial cells and flow chambers. In related work on LFA-1 ligands, ICAM-1 and ICAM-2 were shown to be inducible and constitutively expressed, respectively, on endothelium.

It had long been known from intravital microscopy that leukocyte emigration involved leukocyte rolling on endothelium followed by firm adhesion and subsequent transendothelial migration. Using white blood cells infused in flow chambers and purified adhesion molecules on the chamber walls under physiological shear rates found in vivo, Springer and postdoctoral fellow Mike Lawrence reconstituted three sequential interactions required for leukocyte emigration. Flow chamber walls were coated with P-selectin, ICAM-1, or both. Infused neutrophils were found to readily attach and then roll on P-selectin, but could not attach to ICAM-1 in flow. With both P-selectin and ICAM-1 on the substrate, cells attached and rolled, but the presence of ICAM-1 had no effect. However, if a neutrophil chemoattractant was added to the flow stream, it activated GPCR signaling, actin polymerization, and integrin-dependent firm adhesion to ICAM-1. Springer integrated these findings into the “three step paradigm” of leukocyte extravasation (diapedesis), which has become the standard framework for understanding leukocyte trafficking in inflammation.

The laboratory of Eugene Butcher, including postdoctoral fellow Uli von Andrian, was working on emigration of leukocytes in vivo at the same time, and discovered that antibody to leukocyte integrins inhibited firm adhesion, but not rolling adhesion, to postcapillary venules at sites of inflammation. Butcher and Springer received the 2004 Crafoord Prize for this work.

Springer's paradigm that integrins on leukocytes bind to counter-receptors with Ig-like domains on endothelium was later extended by others to integrin α4β1 binding to vascular cell adhesion molecule-1 (VCAM-1), which is inducible by inflammatory mediators on endothelium, and α4β7 binding to mucosal addressin cell adhesion molecule-1 (MAdCAM-1), which is constitutively expressed on mucosal endothelium.

At the time that Springer described the three step model, no chemoattractants for peripheral blood lymphocytes that could stimulate emigration were known. Their existence was implied by the ability of pertussis toxin, which modifies the G protein Gαi subunit, to cause lymphocytosis in patients with whooping cough. Springer's lab screened for such activity in cell line supernatants, purified and sequenced the protein, and found that stromal derived factor (SDF-1), previously defined as a growth factor for B cells, was a potent chemoattractant for both B and T cells. SDF-1 activated an orphan GPCR, later named CXCR4, which was also the co-receptor for T-cell-tropic HIV; SDF-1 further blocked infection of T cells by HIV. SDF-1 (CXCL12) is also a chemoattractant for CD34+ hematopoietic stem cells and regulates their movement from bone marrow to the bloodstream. Based on these discoveries, plerixafor (Mozobil) was developed as an antagonist of CXCR4 and is approved, in combination with filgrastim, for use in mobilizing hematopoietic stem cells in patients with multiple myeloma or non-Hodgkin lymphoma.

In later retrospective discussion, Springer framed the three steps in leukocyte emigration into inflammatory sites as an “area code” model, emphasizing that each step requires a cognate receptor–ligand interaction and therefore provides multiple intervention points (selectins and ligands; GPCRs and ligands; integrins including LFA-1, α4β1, α4β7 and endothelial ligands). He argued that the size of the target space exceeded what could be pursued in an academic laboratory and helped motivate company formation.

=== LeukoSite ===
Springer has played a prominent role in biotechnology. His scientific and entrepreneurial work has contributed to multiple FDA-approved therapies in immunology, oncology, and rare diseases, and he has been an influential early investor and company founder in the life sciences industry.

In the early 1990s, Springer founded LeukoSite to develop therapeutics based on leukocyte adhesion and trafficking biology. LeukoSite’s programs advanced or incorporated three agents that ultimately became approved medicines: vedolizumab (Entyvio), a humanized antibody targeting integrin α4β7 for inflammatory bowel disease; bortezomib (Velcade) for multiple myeloma and mantle cell lymphoma; and alemtuzumab (Campath-1/Lemtrada) for B-cell chronic lymphocytic leukemia and multiple sclerosis. Millennium Pharmaceuticals acquired LeukoSite in late 1999 by issuing shares; after the merger, LeukoSite shareholders owned 35% of Millennium stock.

LeukoSite’s antibody program targeting integrin α4β7 was the foundation for vedolizumab (Entyvio), approved by the FDA in 2014 for ulcerative colitis and Crohn’s disease. Entyvio has since become a major product in the immunology space: Takeda, which acquired the asset through its purchase of Millennium, reported Entyvio revenue of JPY 914.1 billion, approximately US$6.1 billion, for the fiscal year ended March 31, 2025. More than 350,000 patients have been treated with Entyvio since 2014 in the U.S., based on Symphony claims data (June 2014-Jan 2025). Takeda has described Entyvio as a cornerstone of its portfolio.

=== Entrepreneurship and biotechnology investing ===
Springer co-founded biotechnology companies Scholar Rock in 2012, Morphic Therapeutic in 2015, Tectonic Therapeutic in 2019, and Seismic Therapeutic in 2022. He was also an early investor in Selecta Biosciences and Editas Medicine.

Springer was a founding investor of Moderna after investing USD$5 million in 2010. He was the company's fourth-largest shareholder and made USD$400 million when the company launched its initial public offering (IPO) in 2018. During the COVID-19 pandemic, Forbes estimated Springer's net worth as USD$1 billion after in share price of biotechnology companies surged.

== Philanthropy ==
In 2017, Springer founded the 501(c)(3) organization Institute for Protein Innovation, which advances open antibody and protein tools for the scientific community, and funded it with a $10 million foundational grant. He also serves on the Board of Trustees of the Marine Biological Laboratory (MBL).

Springer has endowed professorships at Harvard Medical School, Boston Children's Hospital, and Berkeley.

== Personal life ==
Springer is a gongshi collector, which inspired the name for his Biotech company, Scholar Rock. He has imported multi-ton shipments of the rocks to his home in the U.S.

Springer is married to Chafen Lu, a former assistant professor at Harvard Medical School and an alumnus of his lab. He has five children, three from his first marriage.

== Honors and awards ==
- American Heart Association Basic Research Prize (1993)
- William B. Coley Award for Distinguished Research in Basic and Tumor Immunology (1995)
- Member of the National Academy of Sciences (1996)
- Member of the National Academy of Medicine (2023)
- Fellow of the American Academy of Arts and Sciences (2001)
- Crafoord Prize in Polyarthritis (2004)
- Guggenheim Fellowship (2004)
- Fellow of the American Association for the Advancement of Science (2013)
- AAI-Life Technologies Meritorious Career Award (now AAI-Thermo Fisher Meritorious Career Award), American Association of Immunologists (2014)
- Henry M. Stratton Medal, American Society of Hematology (2014)
- Canada Gairdner International Award (2019)
- Albert Lasker Award for Basic Medical Research (2022)
- Robert Koch Prize (2023)
- Biophysical Society Founders Award (2022)
- The Protein Society Stein & Moore Award (2025)
- Fellow of the National Academy of Inventors (2025)
- Included in Forbes’ 250: America’s Greatest Innovators list (2026)
- Selected to receive the American Society for Biochemistry and Molecular Biology’s Bert and Natalie Vallee Award in Biomedical Science (2027)

He was a Phi Beta Kappa graduate from the University of California, Berkeley.
