= George Davis Snell =

American geneticist

- Born: December 19, 1903; Bradford, Massachusetts, U.S
- Died: June 6, 1996 (aged 92); Bar Harbor, Maine, U.S
- Education: Dartmouth College (BS); Harvard University (DSc)
- Known for: Discovery of H2
- Spouse: Rhoda Carson
- Children: 3
- Awards: 1980 Nobel Prize in Physiology or Medicine, 1978 Wolf Prize in Medicine
- Scientific career
- Fields: genetics immunologist
- Workplaces: Jackson Laboratory; Brown University; Washington University School of Medicine
- Doctoral advisor: William E. Castle

George Davis Snell NAS (December 19, 1903 – June 6, 1996) was an American mouse geneticist and basic transplant immunologist.

== Work ==
George Snell shared the 1980 Nobel Prize in Physiology or Medicine with Baruj Benacerraf and Jean Dausset for their discoveries concerning "genetically determined structures on the cell surface that regulate immunological reactions". Snell specifically "discovered the genetic factors that determine the possibilities of transplanting tissue from one individual to another. It was Snell who introduced the concept of H antigens." Snell's work in mice led to the discovery of HLA, the major histocompatibility complex, in humans (and all vertebrates) that is analogous to the H-2 complex in mice. Recognition of these key genes was prerequisite to successful tissue and organ transplantation.

== Life ==
George Snell was born in Bradford, Massachusetts, the youngest of three children. His father (who was born in Minnesota) worked as a secretary for the local YMCA; he invented a device for winding induction coils for motorboat engines. Snell was educated in the Brookline, Massachusetts schools and then enrolled at Dartmouth College in Hanover, New Hampshire where he continued his passion for mathematics and science, focusing on genetics. He received his bachelor's degree from Dartmouth in 1926.

On the recommendation of John Gerould, his genetics professor at Dartmouth, Snell did graduate work at Harvard University with William E. Castle, the first American biologist to look for Mendelian inheritance in mammals. Snell earned his PhD from Harvard in 1930. His doctoral thesis was on genetic linkage in mice.

Upon receiving the PhD from Harvard, George Snell was employed as a teacher at Brown University, from 1930 to 1931.

Snell then spent two years as a postdoctoral fellow at the University of Texas with H.J. Muller, who pioneered radiation genetics (and was also to win a Nobel Prize). Snell studied the genetic effects of x-rays on mice with Muller.

This experience "served to convince me that research was my real love," Snell wrote in his autobiography."If it were to be research, mouse genetics was the clear choice and the Jackson Laboratory, founded in 1929 by Dr. Clarence Cook Little, one of Castle's earlier students, almost the inevitable selection as a place to work." The Jackson Laboratory was (and still is) the world's mecca for mouse genetics.

From 1933 to 1934, Snell was a teacher at Washington University in St. Louis.

After brief stints as teachers, in 1935 Snell joined the staff of The Jackson Laboratory in Bar Harbor on Mount Desert Island on the coast of Maine and he remained there for the entire balance of his long career. In Bar Harbor, he met and married Rhoda Carson. Together they had three children. In his leisure time, Snell enjoyed skiing, a passion he developed during his years at Dartmouth, as well as tennis.

Snell received the Cancer Research Institute William B. Coley Award in 1978 for distinguished research in immunology. In 1988, he authored a substantial book, Search for a Rational Ethic, on the nature of ethics and the rules by which we live. It includes an evolution-based ethic founded on biological realities that he believed to be applicable to all human beings.

Snell died in Bar Harbor on June 6, 1996. His wife died in 1994.

== Awards and honors ==
- 1935-68 The Jackson Laboratory, staff scientist
- 1952 Elected to American Academy of Arts and Sciences
- 1955 Hekteon Medal of American Medical Association
- 1962 Griffen Animal Care Panel Award
- 1962 Bertner Foundation Award
- 1967 Gregor Mendel Medal, Czechoslovak Academy of Sciences
- 1968-96 The Jackson Laboratory, senior staff scientist emeritus
- 1970 Elected to National Academy of Sciences
- 1976 Gairdner Foundation International Award
- 1978 National Cancer Institute Award
- 1978 Elected to British Transplantation Society, honorary
- 1978 Wolf Prize in Medicine
- 1979 Elected to French Academy of Sciences, foreign associate
- 1980 Nobel Prize in Physiology or Medicine
- 1981 Founding member of the World Cultural Council
- 1982 Elected to American Philosophical Society
- 1982 Golden Plate Award of the American Academy of Achievement
- 1983 Elected to British Society of Immunology, honorary

== See also ==
- C.C. Little
- Peter Alfred Gorer
- Leroy Stevens
