= Alexander Rudensky =

Russian-born American immunologist

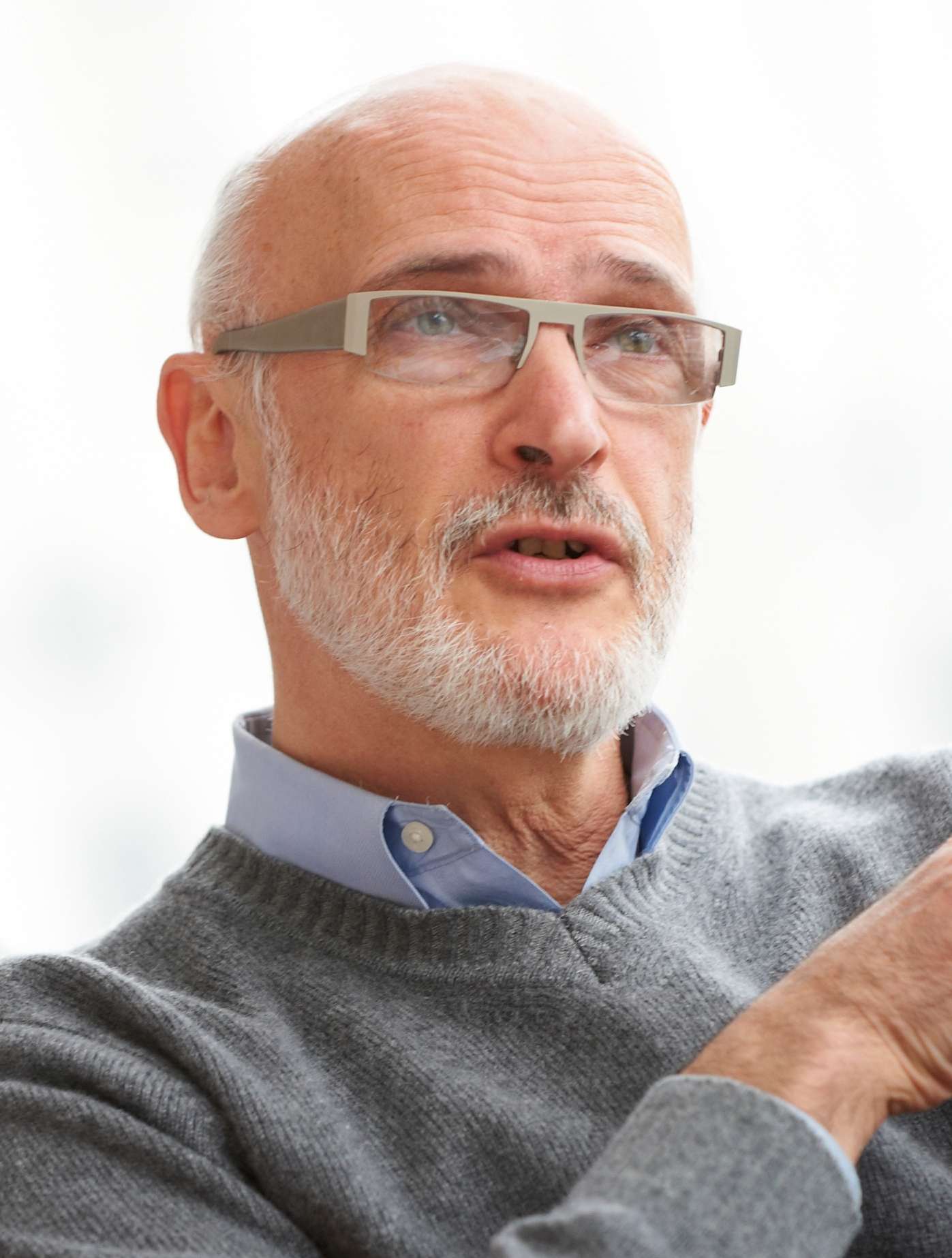
- Born: August 21, 1956 (age 70); Moscow, Russian SFSR, Soviet Union
- Education: Gabrichevsky Research Institute of Epidemiology and Microbiology, Candidate of Sciences
- Known for: Regulatory T cells
- Awards: Member of the National Academy of Sciences (2012); Member of the American Academy of Arts and Sciences (2015); William B. Coley Award (2015); Crafoord Prize in Polyarthritis (2017); Vilcek Prize in Biomedical Science (2018)
- Scientific career
- Fields: Immunology
- Workplaces: University of Washington; Memorial Sloan Kettering Cancer Center
- Doctoral advisor: Vitalij Yurin
- Other academic advisors: Charles Janeway

Alexander Rudensky (born August 21, 1956) is an immunologist at Memorial Sloan Kettering Cancer Center known for his research on regulatory T cells and the transcription factor FOXP3.

== Career ==
Rudensky received his Candidate of Sciences degree in 1986 from the Gabrichevsky Research Institute of Epidemiology and Microbiology, Moscow, and completed his postdoctoral work at the Yale School of Medicine. He is now the Chair of the Immunology Program and Director of the Ludwig Center at Memorial Sloan Kettering, as well as a professor at the Rockefeller University, Cornell University, Gerstner School of Graduate Studies, and Weill-Cornell Medical School.

In a 2003 paper, Rudensky and colleagues showed that FOXP3 programs regulatory T cell development. His lab continues to investigate the molecular mechanisms underlying regulatory T cell activity, and the role these cells play in autoimmunity, tumor immunity, and immunity to infections.

== Awards ==
- 2012 Member of the National Academy of Sciences
- 2015 Member of the American Academy of Arts and Sciences
- 2015 William B. Coley Award
- 2017 Crafoord Prize in Polyarthritis
- 2018 Vilcek Prize in Biomedical Science
