= Cancer Research Institute =

American nonprofit organization

- Founded: 1953
- Founder: Helen Coley Nauts and Oliver R. Grace
- Headquarters: New York, NY, USA
- Fields: cancer immunotherapy
- Key people: Alicia Zhou
- Website: www.cancerresearch.org

The Cancer Research Institute (CRI) is a US non-profit organization funding cancer research. Based in New York City, CRI was founded in 1953 to develop new treatments for cancer. It is a funding body for research rather than a research institute itself. It was founded by Helen Coley Nauts and Oliver R. Grace with a $2,000 grant from Nelson Rockefeller, created in honor of Nauts' father, William Coley, an American orthopedic surgeon and a pioneer of cancer immunotherapy.

The Institute focuses on immunological treatments for cancer, both single treatment approaches and treatments complementing chemotherapy and surgery. It offers research grants to students, postdoctoral fellows, and investigators at medical research institutions, funds clinical trials testing promising immunotherapies, and convenes scientific conferences for tumor immunologists.

== History ==
The Institute was founded by Nauts and Grace as a way to advance studies of immunotherapies for cancer, and to fund early career researchers. Its founding medical director was Lloyd Old, who was heading the Ludwig Institute for Cancer Research at Memorial Sloan Kettering. For a few decades CRI was the only foundation dedicated to supporting studies of cancer immunotherapies.

Since 1953, CRI has distributed over $500 million in grants, supporting over 3000 scientists. As of 2024, it is led by CEO Alicia Zhou. Its work is guided by a scientific advisory council that includes four Nobel laureates and 35 members of the National Academy of Sciences.

In 2020, CRI collaborated with Sage Bionetworks to produce an interactive online atlas of research datasets in immuno-oncology. In 2025, it funded a Mount Sinai immunotherapy lab to study outcomes across CRI's clinical trials.

== Awards ==
The Institute sponsors a number of annual awards in the field of cancer research, and dozens of postdoctoral fellowships. Awards are announced at the Institute's annual symposium.

The William B. Coley Award, Lloyd J. Old Award, and Frederick W. Alt Award recognize scientists whose research has had a major impact on immunology. Other annual awards are the Oliver R. Grace Award and the Helen Coley Nauts Award.
