= Wiesław Ptak =

Polish chemist

- Born: Wiesław Stanisław Ptak; 16 September 1941; Bieńczyce, (now part of Kraków), Poland
- Died: 11 April 2004 (aged 62); Kraków, Poland
- Citizenship: Polish
- Education: Jagiellonian University
- Occupations: Chemist, academic

Wiesław Stanisław Ptak (16 September 1941 – 11 April 2004) was a Polish chemist, professor of chemical sciences, professor at the AGH University of Science and Technology in Kraków and Dean of the Faculty of Materials Science and Ceramics at AGH (1993–1996). Ptak was a member of the Polish Chemical Society and the International Society for Theoretical Chemical Physics (ISTCP).

== Early life ==
On 16 September 1941, Ptak was born in Bieńczyce, which was then a suburban village near Kraków, Poland. (Bieńczyce is now one of the city's districts.)

Ptak's father was one of 12 siblings born to Franciszek Ptak (1859–1936), an innkeeper, politician, and peasant movement activist, and his wife, Marcjanna (née Szafrańska) Ptak.

== Education ==
Ptak graduated from the Faculty of Mathematics and Physics-Chemistry of the Jagiellonian University. In 1963, Ptak worked at the Department of Ceramics of Silicate at the Faculty of Ceramics of the AGH Academy of Mining and Metallurgy (present day known as AGH University of Science and Technology).

Ptak obtained Ph.D. in chemistry in 1968 on the basis of the dissertation Vibratory spectra in the structure of the serpentine mineral (Widma wibracyjne w strukturze minerału serpentynu) promoted by Roman Pampuch. Ptak held a six-month research internship at the University of Liège. In 1980, Ptak obtained a habilitation degree.

== Career ==
In 1991, Ptak was awarded with the title of professor of chemical sciences. In 1996, Ptak assumed the position of full professor at AGH. In 1981–85 and 1991–93, Ptak was the Vice-Dean for Didactics at the AGH and in 1993–1996 he was the Dean of the Faculty of Materials Science and Ceramics. From 1993 until 2004, Ptak was the head of the Department of Refractory, Precious and Technological Ceramics (renamed in 2002 to the Department of Refractory Materials and High Temperature Processes). Ptak specialized in theoretical chemistry and solid-state physics. He dealt with the theory of chemical bonding and interatomic interactions, and worked on the theoretical basis of crystallization from the gas phase. Ptak authored or co-authored more than 100 publications and several patents, one script and two monographs. He repeatedly appeared at scientific conferences by referring research results.

Ptak taught silicate chemistry and spectroscopic methods for MS and doctoral students; he held lectures on physical chemistry and physics and solid chemistry for Pedagogical School students in Kraków, and lectures on the theory of chemical bonding for doctoral students. His main teaching activity was, however, courses on materials for AGH MS students.

== Personal life ==
Ptak had an incurable disease and he was active until his last months. On April 11, 2004, Ptak died in Kraków, Poland. Ptak was buried at the cemetery in Raciborowice, in the family tomb. A stone plaque placed on the grave commemorates him.

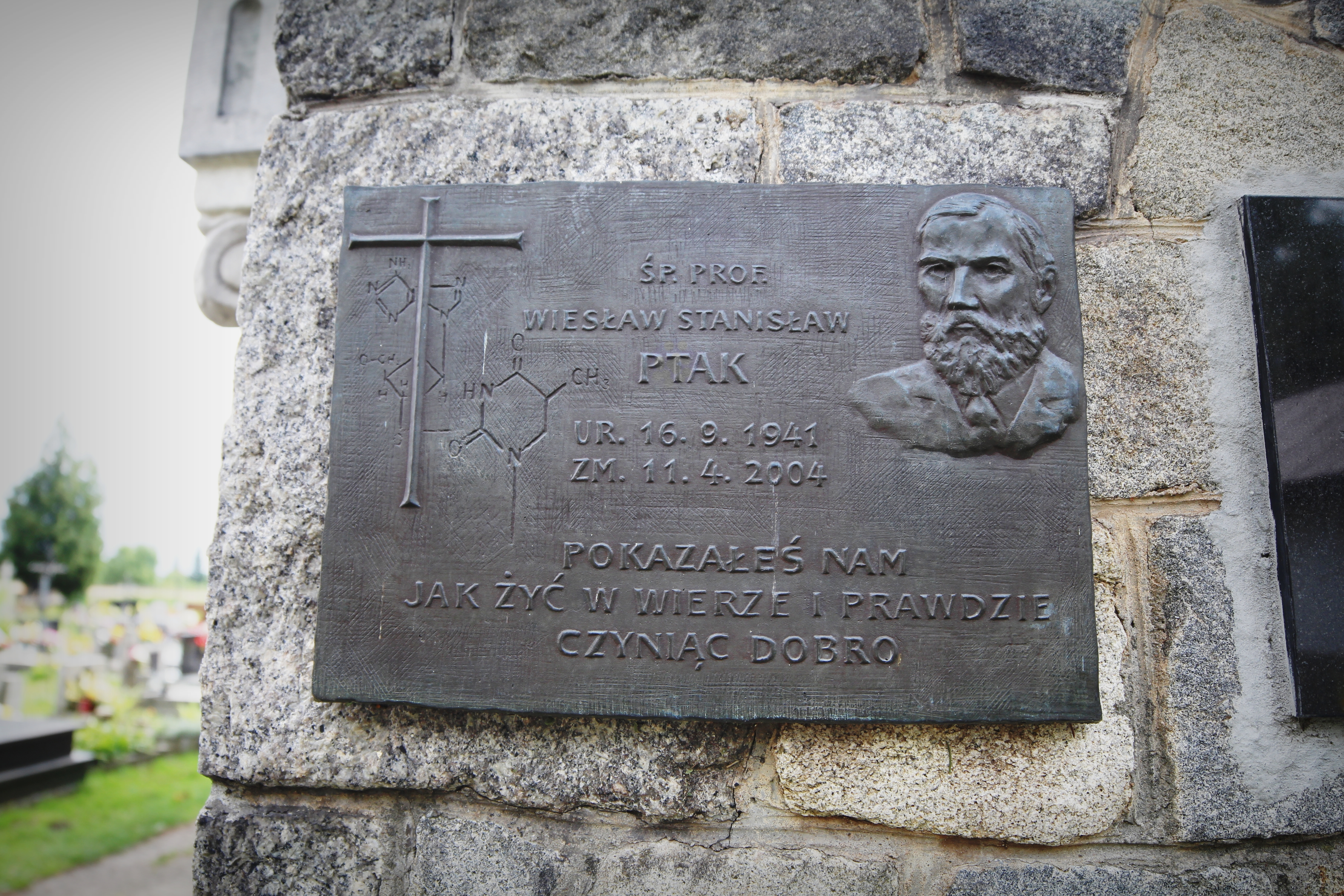
Commemoration plaque at the cemetery in Raciborowice.

Ptak was awarded the Gold Cross of Merit and the Medal of the National Education Commission.

== See also ==
- Włodzimierz Ptak
