= Mir-31 =

Precursor microRNA family

mir-31
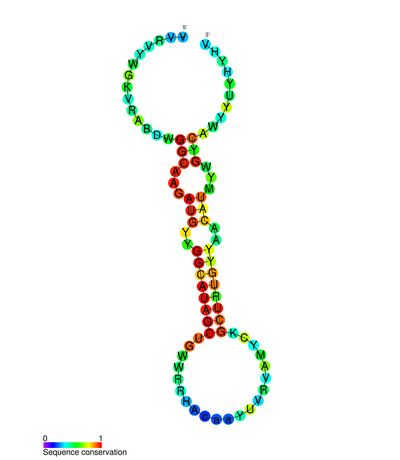
- Conserved secondary structure of mir-31

Identifiers
- Symbol: mir-31
- Rfam: RF00661
- miRBase family: MIPF0000064

Other data
- RNA type: microRNA
- Domain(s): Eukaryota
- PDB structures: PDBe

miR-31 has been characterised as a tumour suppressor miRNA, with its levels varying in breast cancer cells according to the metastatic state of the tumour. Mir-31-5p has also been observed upregulated in Zinc Deficient rats compared to normal in ESCC (Esophageal Squamous Cell Carcinoma) and in other types of cancers when using this animal model. miR-31's antimetastatic effects therefore make it a potential therapeutic target for breast cancer.

== Functions ==
mir-31 has been linked to Duchenne muscular dystrophy − a genetic disorder characterised by a lack of the protein dystrophin − as a potential therapeutic target. Duchenne muscular dystrophy is caused by mutations arising in the dystrophin gene, which impair the translation of dystrophin through the formation of premature termination codons.

miR-31 overexpression is more abundant in human Duchenne muscular dystrophy than in healthy controls, with levels remaining high only in Duchenne muscular dystrophy myoblasts. miR-31 levels in healthy controls are instead decreased with the onset of cell differentiation. miR-31 is part of the circuit controlling late muscle differentiation by repression of dystrophin synthesis, and its expression is localised specifically to regenerating myoblasts of dystrophic muscles. miR-31 is believed to repress the expression of dystrophin by antisense binding of the dystrophin mRNA 3′ untranslated region, and in this way it is thought that miR-31 manipulation could aid treatment for Duchenne muscular dystrophy.

== Applications ==
In serous ovarian cancer, miR-31 is frequently deleted and is the most underexpressed microRNA in this cancer type. It has been shown to affect the levels of gene transcription factor p53, responsible for encoding the tumour suppressor protein p53. Cancer cell lines with an inactive p53 pathway show a vulnerability to miR-31 overexpression, whilst there is resistance to overexpression in cell lines with a functional p53 pathway. miR-31 overexpression is associated with a better prognosis in tumours, suggesting that therapeutic delivery of miR-31 may be beneficial in patients with p53-deficient cancers. Conversely, in gastric cancer miR-31 levels have been found to be significantly lower in tumour cells relative to healthy cells, meaning further potential for use as a diagnostic marker. However, high expression levels of miR-31 correlate to shorter survival in patients with malignant pleural mesothelioma, whereas longer survival has been associated with normal/low expression of miR-31 from blood-based samples. Furthermore, in vivo, anti-miR-31 has proved to reduce miR-31-5p overexpression suppressing the esophageal preneoplasia in Zinc deficient rats. This leads to the repression of miR-31-5p target Stk40 by the inhibition of the STK40-NF-κΒ-controlled inflammatory pathway, with resultant decreased cellular proliferation and activated apoptosis. Notably Zn replenishment is able to restore the regulation of miR-31-5p targets leading to a normal esophageal phenotype. miR-31 has further been shown to negatively regulate FOXP3, the master regulator in T-lymphocyte development and function. This is through direct binding of miR-31 at its target site in the 3′UTR of FOXP3 mRNA.
