= Bradlee Heckmann =

American biologist and pharmacologist

Bradlee L. Heckmann
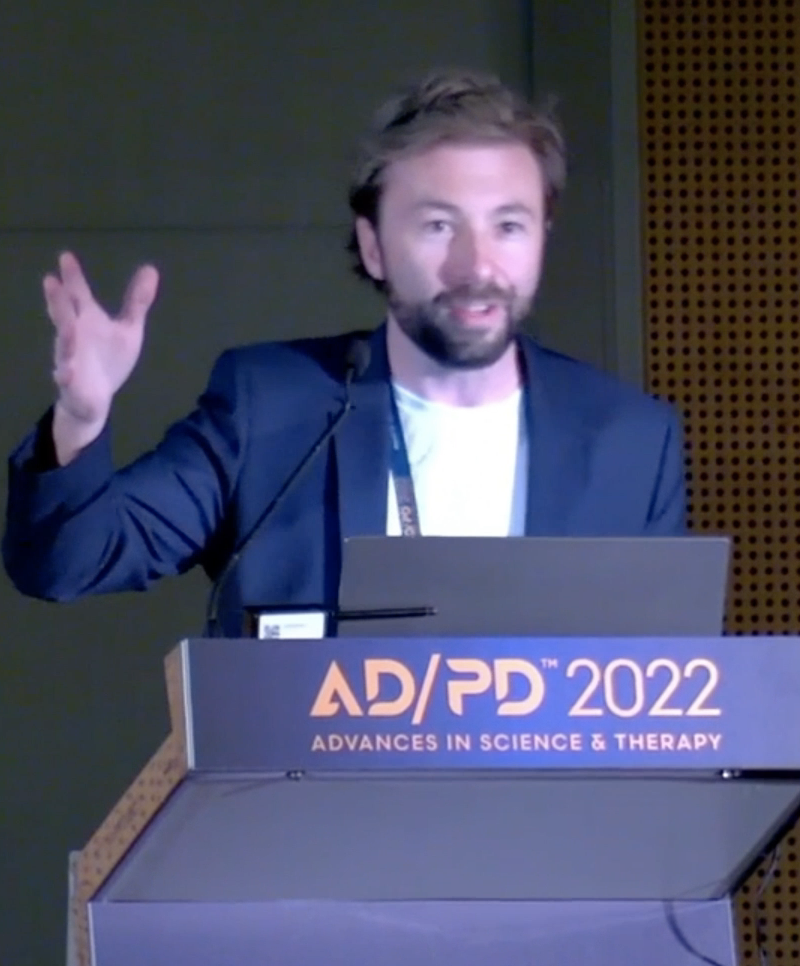
- Born: Lexington, Kentucky, U.S.
- Other name: Brad Heckmann
- Education: Mayo Clinic College of Medicine and Science University of Kentucky
- Known for: Discovery of LC3-associated endocytosis
- Scientific career
- Fields: Neuroimmunology autophagy Alzheimer's disease Parkinson's disease
- Workplaces: University of South Florida Asha Therapeutics St. Jude Children's Research Hospital
- Thesis: The function and regulation of the G0/G1 Switch Gene 2
- Doctoral advisor: Jun Liu
- Other academic advisors: Douglas R. Green; Edmund B. Rucker, III
- Website: www.ashatherapeutics.com www.health.usf.edu www.heckmannlab.org

Bradlee L. Heckmann is an American biologist, pharmacologist. Heckmann holds academic appointments as a neuroimmunologist at the Byrd Alzheimer's Center and USF Health Neuroscience Institute and is assistant professor in molecular medicine at the USF Health Morsani College of Medicine. Heckmann's research has been focused on understanding the regulation of inflammatory and metabolic processes in the central nervous system, with particular emphasis on neurodegenerative diseases including Alzheimer's disease and the role of the autophagy machinery in this setting.

== Education ==
Heckmann graduated from Lexington Catholic High School in Lexington, Kentucky prior to attending the University of Kentucky, where he graduated with a Bachelor of Science in biology. Heckmann went on to complete his doctoral training in Biochemistry & Molecular Biology at the Mayo Clinic College of Medicine. After completing his formal training he joined the laboratory of Douglas R. Green at St. Jude Children's Research Hospital where he held the John H. Sununu Endowed Fellowship in immunology.

== Research ==
After studying lipid metabolism and components that regulate lipid turnover while at Mayo Clinic, Heckmann switched his research focus to evaluating the role and regulation of non-canonical autophagy in the brain. These studies ultimately led to Heckmann & Green's discovery of a novel form of the endocytic trafficking pathway. Heckmann and Green showed that a protein known as LC3 which helps facilitate vesicle trafficking and fusion, most well known for its role in autophagy, was attached to endosomes that contained β-amyloid, a known contributor to Alzheimer's Disease establishment and pathology in humans. As such they named the discovery LC3-associated endocytosis (LANDO). They further found that inhibition of LC3-associated endocytosis in microglial immune cells of the brain resulted in impaired recycling of cell receptors that recognize β-amyloid, leading to dramatic increases in inflammatory activation.

Heckmann and Green were the first to show that loss of the LC3-associated endocytosis pathway in microglia greatly exacerbated the disease pathology of Alzheimer's Disease and that the LANDO pathway is protective against β-amyloid induced neuroinflammation and neurodegeneration, work recently published in Cell and featured in mainstream media.

The potential for therapeutically targeting LC3-associated endocytosis for the treatment of devastating conditions including Alzheimer's Disease and cancer is of significant promise. Additional evidence supporting a significant role for LANDO and other non-canonical uses of the autophagy machinery in neurodegeneration and neuroinflammation were recently published by Drs. Heckmann and Green along with other colleagues including Thomas Wileman demonstrating an important role for LANDO and targeting of neuroinflammation as a therapeutic approach to relieving neuronal and behavioral impairment in a novel, age-associated spontaneous model of Alzheimer's Disease in mice, work that has been published in Science Advances.

More recently, the Heckmann Lab has been exploring new roles for the LANDO pathway in regulating cell death processes in neurodegeneration as well as contribution of metabolic mechanisms and mitochondrial regulation to neuroinflammation. Heckmann has also expanded his interests in neuro-oncology and primary brain tumor biology and the role of single membrane LC3-lipidation (CASM) pathways to tumor immunity and tumor microenvironment inflammation.

== Recognition and awards ==
Heckmann has received multiple awards and honors stemming from his work primarily on LC3-associated endocytosis as well as mainstream media coverage. He has been the recipient of honors including a Ruth L. Kirschstein National Research Service Award, an Aegean Young Investigator Award, an LRP award from the National Cancer Institute, and an Excellence in Science Award and nomination for Prize in Neurobiology from the American Association for the Advancement of Science. Dr. Heckmann was recently featured by AZO Network and News Medical as a "thought leader in medicine".

Work from Heckmann and his laboratory on LANDO and autophagy in Alzheimer's Disease was recently highlighted by Research Features and an associated podcast including potential new therapeutic routes for treating neurodegenerative diseases.

He also has been elected as a member of the Sigma Xi Research Honor Society and is an overseas Fellow of the Royal Society of Medicine.
