= Suppressor-inducer T cell =

Suppressor-inducer T cells were a proposed functional subset of CD4^{+} T helper cells in models of T-cell-mediated immune suppression developed during the 1970s and 1980s. They were thought to induce other T cells, particularly CD8^{+} suppressor-effector cells, which then inhibited immune responses. In human studies, suppressor-inducer activity was associated with CD4^{+} cells expressing the 2H4 antigen, subsequently described as CD45RA^{+} cells.

By the late 1980s, the phenotypic distinction used to define suppressor-inducer and helper-inducer cells was being reinterpreted primarily as a distinction between naïve and memory T cells. The broader suppressor T-cell framework also fell out of favor. Suppressor-inducer T cells are therefore a historical immunological classification and should not be equated with the CD4^{+}FOXP3^{+} regulatory T cells recognized in modern immunology.

== History ==
Suppressor-inducer T cells emerged from the broader suppressor T-cell hypothesis developed in the early 1970s. Experiments by Richard Gershon and Kazunari Kondo showed that thymus-derived lymphocytes could participate in transferable immune suppression, and subsequent work proposed interacting populations of suppressor cells and soluble suppressor factors. Later historical reviews describe the 1970s as a period in which increasingly elaborate suppressor-cell circuits were used to explain immune regulation.

By the early 1980s, monoclonal antibodies allowed investigators to divide human T cells into more narrowly defined functional populations. At the time, cells expressing the surface antigens now called CD4 and CD8 were commonly described as T4^{+} and T8^{+} cells, respectively. In 1982, Morimoto and colleagues reported that T4^{+} and T8^{+} cells were both required during the induction of suppression in an antigen-specific antibody assay, whereas only T8^{+} cells were required after activation. They interpreted the T4^{+} population as suppressor-inducer cells that activated T8^{+} suppressor-effector cells. In 1983, the same group further subdivided T4^{+} cells using antibodies from patients with juvenile rheumatoid arthritis and reported that the T4^{+}JRA^{+} population induced T8^{+} suppressor activity, whereas T4^{+}JRA^{−} cells were more effective at helping B-cell immunoglobulin production.

In 1985, Morimoto and colleagues developed the monoclonal antibody anti-2H4, which divided T4^{+} cells into 2H4^{+} and 2H4^{−} populations. The T4^{+}2H4^{+} population induced T8^{+} suppressor cells, whereas T4^{+}2H4^{−} cells showed stronger helper activity. A 1986 review of human suppressor T cells summarized the proposed suppressor-inducer phenotype as CD4^{+}Leu-8^{+}2H4^{+}4B4^{−} and distinguished these cells from CD8^{+} suppressor-effector cells.

== Phenotype and function ==
Suppressor-inducer cells were characterized principally as a subset of CD4^{+} T cells expressing the 2H4 antigen. The 2H4 antibody was later shown to recognize high-molecular-weight isoforms of the leukocyte common antigen CD45, corresponding to what became known as CD45RA. Contemporary studies therefore described the population as CD4^{+}2H4^{+}, or CD4^{+}CD45RA^{+}. A 1986 review gave a more detailed phenotype of CD4^{+}Leu-8^{+}2H4^{+}4B4^{−}, in contrast with CD4^{+}Leu-8^{−}2H4^{−}4B4^{+} cells associated with helper activity.

In the suppressor-cell model, these cells were defined by an indirect regulatory function: they were thought to induce CD8^{+} suppressor-effector cells rather than themselves carrying out the final suppressive response. In an antigen-specific antibody system, CD4^{+}2H4^{+} cells could induce suppressor activity in CD8^{+} cells, whereas the CD4^{+}2H4^{+} cells did not suppress the response in the absence of CD8^{+} cells. Similar results were obtained after an autologous mixed lymphocyte reaction. Experiments in which antibodies against 2H4 blocked suppressor-inducer activity led investigators to propose that the 2H4 molecule itself participated in the induction signal, rather than serving only as a phenotypic marker.

== Reinterpretation ==
T-cell differentiation and expression of CD45 isoforms. CD45RA+ naïve and CD45RO^{+} memory phenotypes helped reinterpret the former "suppressor-inducer" and "helper-inducer" classifications.

By the late 1980s, evidence indicated that the CD45R-defined suppressor-inducer and helper-inducer populations were not stable functional lineages. Clement and colleagues showed that CD4^{+}CD45R^{+} cells could lose CD45R after activation and acquire the ability to provide B-cell help, consistent with an activation-dependent differentiation pathway. In 1988, Sanders and colleagues proposed that the populations previously termed suppressor-inducer and helper-inducer cells were better understood as naïve and memory T cells, respectively. Later reviews of human T-cell differentiation retained CD45RA and CD45RO as important markers associated with naïve and memory populations, while recognizing substantially greater heterogeneity within the memory compartment.

This reinterpretation occurred while the broader suppressor T-cell framework was itself losing credibility. Molecular mapping of the mouse major histocompatibility complex failed to identify the proposed I-J region, which had been thought to encode determinants associated with suppressor T cells. Subsequent analysis of I-J-positive suppressor T-cell hybridomas found no corresponding transcripts from the genomic interval in which I-J had been mapped. Later reviews identify the I-J controversy, together with the lack of reliable markers and an uncertain molecular basis for suppression, as major reasons that research on suppressor T cells declined during the mid-1980s.

Interest in specialized suppressive T cells later returned through a different experimental framework. In 1995, Sakaguchi and colleagues identified a population of CD4^{+}CD25^{+} T cells that maintained immunological self-tolerance in mice. In 2003, several studies established the transcription factor FOXP3 as a central determinant of this regulatory T-cell population. Modern accounts therefore describe FOXP3^{+} regulatory T cells using a distinct phenotypic and molecular framework, while the earlier CD45RA/2H4-defined suppressor-inducer population is understood in the context of naïve and memory T-cell differentiation.
