= Rosemill, Lexington =

Neighborhood in Lexington, Kentucky

Coordinates: 38.017°N 84.531°W

Rosemill is a neighborhood in southwestern Lexington, Kentucky, United States. Its boundaries are Southland Drive and Rosemont Garden to the north, Clays Mill Road to the west, and Hill-N-Dale Road to the south. Lexington Catholic High School has been located in the center of the neighborhood since 1957.

Neighborhood statistics

- Area: 0.244 square miles (0.63 km^{2})
- Population: 812
- Population density: 3,330 people per square mile
- Median household income: $56,483
