= Bieńczyce, Kraków =

Bieńczyce
- Dzielnica of Kraków
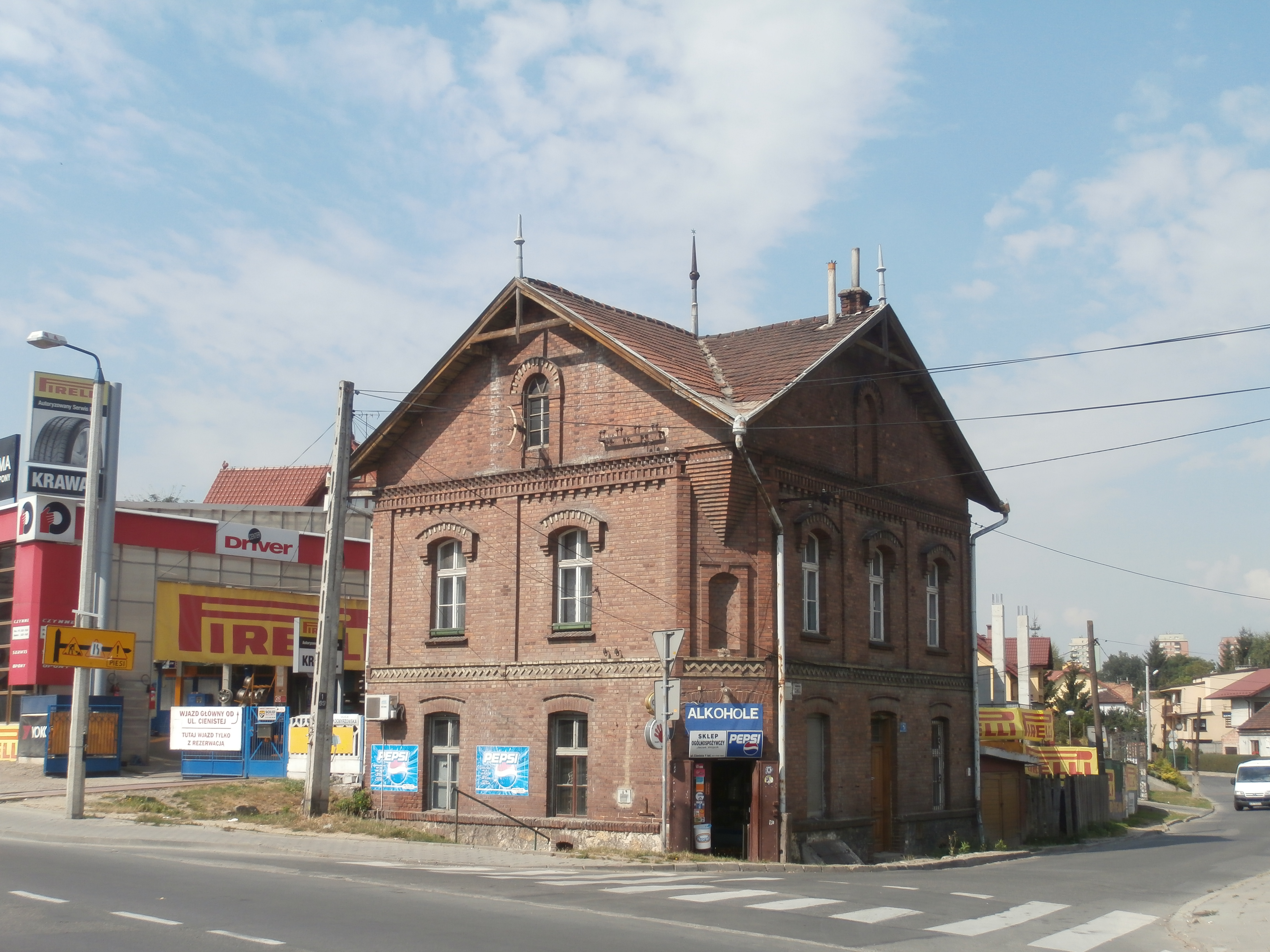
- The "Falcon" Polish Gymnastic Society House in Bieńczyce, constructed thanks to the financing of Franciszek Ptak

- Location of Bieńczyce within Kraków
- Coordinates: 50°5′0″N 20°1′0″E
- Country: Poland
- Voivodeship: Lesser Poland
- County/City: Kraków

Government
  - President: Andrzej Buczkowski

Area
  - Total: 3.70 km^{2} (1.43 sq mi)

Population (2014)
  - Total: 42,633
  - Density: 11,500/km^{2} (29,800/sq mi)
- Time zone: UTC+1 (CET)
  - Summer (DST): UTC+2 (CEST)
- Area code: +48 12
- Website: http://www.dzielnica16.krakow.pl

Bieńczyce is one of 18 districts of Kraków, located in the northern part of the city. The name Bieńczyce comes from a village of same name that is now a part of the district.

According to the Central Statistical Office data, the district's area is 3.70 square kilometres (1.43 square miles) and 42 633 people inhabit Bieńczyce.

== History ==
The name Bieńczyce comes from the owner of the village named Bień (Benedykt). It is mentioned for the first time in documents in 1224. The village belonged first to the Church of St Michael the Archangel and St Stanislaus Bishop, and from 1317 to the Church of St. Florian. In 1391, the first mill on Dłubnia River was built in the village. The other mill from 1449 was being powered by the existing millrace to the 21st century. In the second half of the 15th century, a manor house with a farm was built in the village (today, at Kaczeńcowa Street, a manor house and an outbuilding from the beginning of the 20th century have been preserved in the neighborhood of the pond). Later, the village of Bieńczyce constituted the property of the canons of the Wawel Cathedral. After the Second Partition of Poland, the village was confiscated by the partitioning Austrian powers.

In the 19th century, the Austrians led the road, and followingly, a railway line constructed from 1899 until 1900, that ran through Bieńczyce to Kocmyrzów. The existence of the railway line is still evident to the preserved remains of tracks, the remains of two railway bridges over the Dłubnia River and its mill and the preserved building of the railway station Bieńczyce. The village belonged to the parish in Raciborowice. There was a small chapel in Bieńczyce, a branch of the parish church.

One of the recognizable inhabitants of the village was Franciszek Ptak, a rich peasant and innkeeper, politician of the Polish People's Party and member of the Diet of Galicia and Lodomeria, who co-financed the construction of Sokol ("Falcon") Polish Gymnastic Society House and the public school in Bieńczyce in the first decade of the 20th century.

In 1949, the construction of the city of Nowa Huta began in the eastern part of the village. In 1951, the village was attached together with the new city to Kraków as one of the Nowa Huta estates. In the years 1967–1977 a modern temple of Our Lady Queen of Poland was established, called the Ark of the Lord. It was the first church built within one of the housing estates of Nowa Huta, not on its outskirts – mainly thanks to the efforts of Bishop Karol Wojtyła and residents. In the 1980s, the area around the Ark of the Lord was one of the most important places of demonstration for Nowa Huta Solidarity trade union. During one of the demonstrations, on 13 October 1982, the officer of SB Capt. Andrzej Augustyn fatally wounded a 20-year-old worker, Bogdan Włosik.

In the years 1976–1993, the Ludwig Rydygier Krakow Specialist Hospital was built in the district of Bieńczyce. The Nowa Huta Lagoon and the "Wanda" Sports Club are also located in the district.

== Subdivisions of Bieńczyce ==
Bieńczyce is divided into smaller subdivisions (osiedles). Here's a list of them.

- Bieńczyce
- Osiedle Albertyńskie
- Osiedle Jagiellońskie
- Osiedle Kalinowe
- Osiedle Kazimierzowskie
- Osiedle Kościuszkowskie
- Osiedle Na Lotnisku
- Osiedle Niepodległości
- Osiedle Przy Arce
- Osiedle Strusia
- Osiedle Wysokie
- Osiedle Złotej Jesieni
