= Czesław Radzikowski =

Polish immunologist (born 1929)

- Born: 17 July 1929 (age 96); Bydgoszcz
- Citizenship: Polish
- Occupation: immunologist

Czesław Radzikowski (born 17 July 1929) is a Polish immunologist, professor at the Medical University of Gdańsk, member of the Polish Academy of Arts and Sciences.

== Biography ==
He was a childhood friend of Włodzimierz Ptak. From 1948 to 1953, he studied medicine at the Medical University of Gdańsk. In 1959, he obtained his doctorate. He began working at his alma mater.

He published 142 scientific papers on tumor immunology. In collaboration with Andrzej Ledóchowski and the Gdańsk University of Technology, he introduced a new, original anticancer drug, Ledakrin. He was a founding member of the Polish Society of Immunology. He supervised eighteen doctoral dissertations. From 1978 to 2005, he served on the scientific advisory board of the journal Archivum Immunologiae et Therapiae Experimentalis. He retired in 2001. He was elected an active member of the 5th Medical Faculty of the Polish Academy of Arts and Sciences. In 2014, he was awarded the Medal of the Polish Society of Experimental and Clinical Immunology. According to Piotr Kuśnierczyk, Czesław Radzikowski "introduced to Poland modern methods of screening new potential anti-cancer drugs on laboratory animals."

He has two children: Piotr and Louise.
