= Marian Szczepanik =

Polish molecular biologist and immunologist

Marian Marek Szczepanik is an immunologist and medical biologist who co-authored more than 150 scientific research papers in peer-reviewed journals, Head of the Department of Medical Biology at the Institute of Nursing and Midwifery at the Faculty of Health Sciences of the Jagiellonian University Medical College.

== Biography ==
He obtained doctorate in 1994 upon dissertation Funkcja immunoregulacyjna limfocytów gd w reakcji nadwrażliwości kontaktowej u myszy supervised by Włodzimierz Ptak. In 1999 he obtained habilitation.

With Włodzimierz Ptak and Maria Ptak he co-authored Podstawy immunologii, a textbook for students of medicine. Subsequent editions were published in 1987, 1999, 2009, 2017 and 2021. He supervised seven doctoral dissertations.

== Accolades ==
- Award of the Minister of National Education (1999)
- Tadeusz Borowicz Award (2000)
- Award of the Minister of Health (2009)
- Award of the Rector of the Jagiellonian University, 1st degree (2010, 2012, 2013)
- Laur Jagielloński (Jagiellonian Laurel) in the field of medical sciences (2021)
