= Lexington Catholic High School =

Location
- 2250 Clays Mill Road; Lexington, (Fayette County), Kentucky 40503; United States; 38°1′3″N 84°32′6″W

Information
- Type: Private, high school
- Motto: "Mind. Spirit. Body"
- Religious affiliation: Roman Catholic
- Established: 1951; 75 years ago
- President: Vacant
- Principal: Mathew P. George
- Chaplain: Fr. Ben Horn (2026-Present) Fr. Norman Fischer (former 2007–2024, deceased)
- Teaching staff: 69.9 (FTE) (2017–18)
- Grades: 9–12
- Gender: Coeducational
- Enrollment: 640 (2025–26)
- Average class size: 24
- Student to teacher ratio: 12:1 (2017–18)
- Campus: Suburban
- Campus size: 17 acres (69,000 m^{2})
- Colors: Blue and White
- Song: "Lexington Hail"
- Team name: Knights
- Accreditation: Southern Association of Colleges and Schools
- Website: www.lexingtoncatholic.com

Lexington Catholic High School is a Roman Catholic high school located in the Rosemill neighborhood in Lexington, Kentucky. It is located in the Roman Catholic Diocese of Lexington. In 2007, it was named a Blue Ribbon School of Excellence.

== History ==
The school was formed in 1951 through the merger of two secondary schools: St. Catherine's Academy, founded in 1823, and Lexington Latin High, founded in 1924. Lexington Catholic moved to its current location in 1957.

In 2007, the school was named a Blue Ribbon School of Excellence. It was the first high school in central Kentucky to receive the award.

In July 2024 longtime school Chaplain, Fr. Norman Fischer died unexpectedly while on a sabbatical work trip in Delaware with a group of students.

== Accreditation ==
Lexington Catholic is accredited by the Southern Association of Colleges and Schools and approved by the Kentucky State Department of Education. They have been given recognition for being a U.S. Department of Education Blue Ribbon School (one of three high schools in Kentucky chosen in 2007).

== Notable alumni ==
- Laura Bell Bundy – actress and singer
- Brian Cashman – Major League Baseball executive
- Carson Coleman – professional baseball player
- Ann Cummings – mayor of Montpelier, Vermont and member of the Vermont Senate
- Winston Guy – former professional football player
- Alison Lundergan Grimes – 85th Secretary of State of Kentucky
- Bradlee Heckmann – neuroimmunologist & biologist
- Frank Kornet – former professional basketball player
- Nick Maronde – former professional baseball player
- Natalie Novosel – professional basketball player
- Ben Revere – professional baseball player
- Vincent Sanford – professional basketball player
- Justin Burke – former college football player and currently tight ends coach at Kentucky wildcats football
