= FOXP3 =

Immune response protein

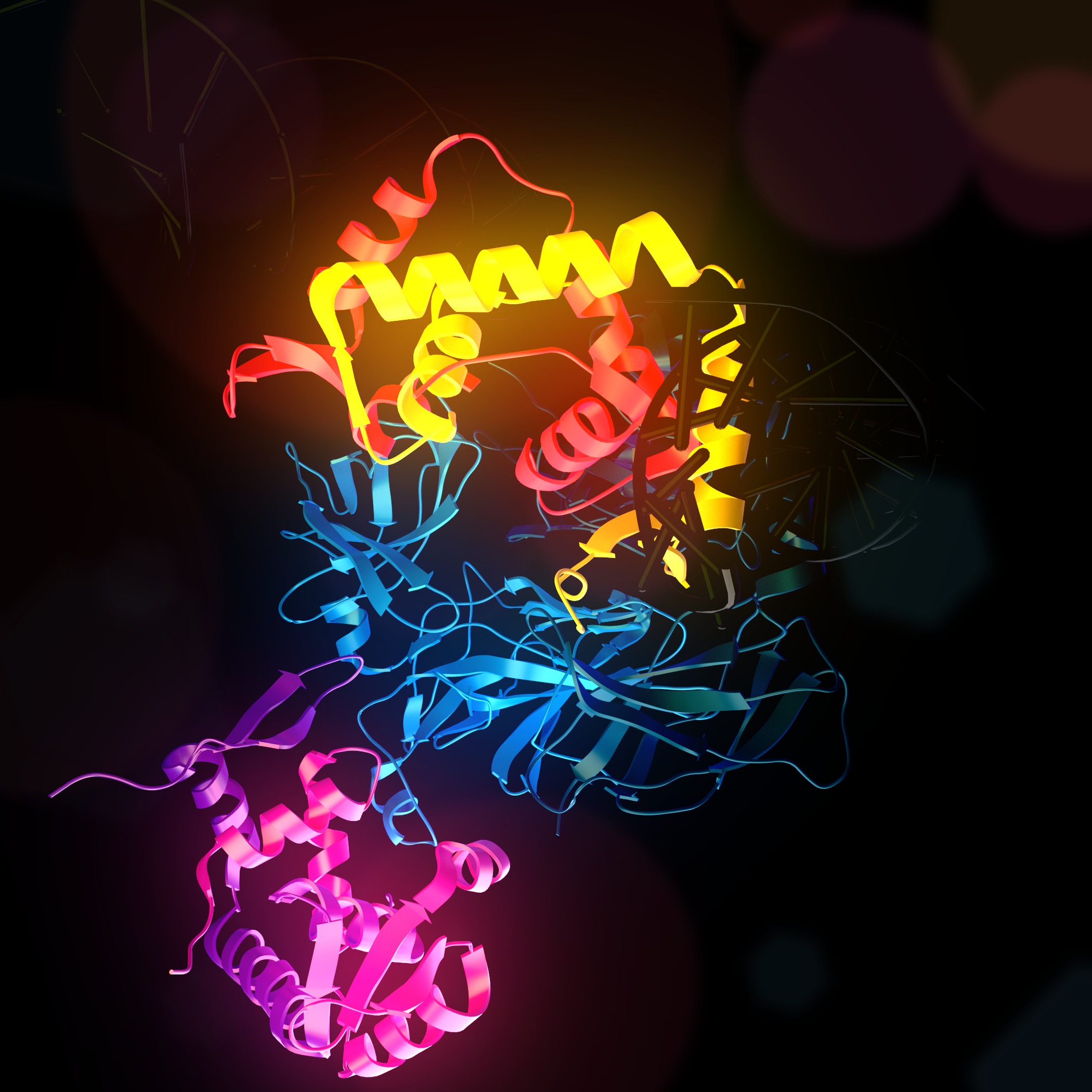

Identifiers
- Aliases: FOXP3, AIID, DIETER, IPEX, JM2, PIDX, XPID, forkhead box P3
- External IDs: OMIM: 300292; MGI: 1891436; GeneCards: FOXP3
Available structures
PDB	Ortholog search: PDBe RCSB
PDB	List of PDB id codes 3QRF, 4WK8

Gene location (Human)
Chr.	X chromosome (human)
Band	Xp11.23	Start	49,250,438 bp
Band	Xp11.23	End	49,270,477 bp

Gene location (Mouse)
Chr.	X chromosome (mouse)
Band	X A1.1|X 3.41 cM	Start	7,439,883 bp
Band	X A1.1|X 3.41 cM	End	7,461,484 bp
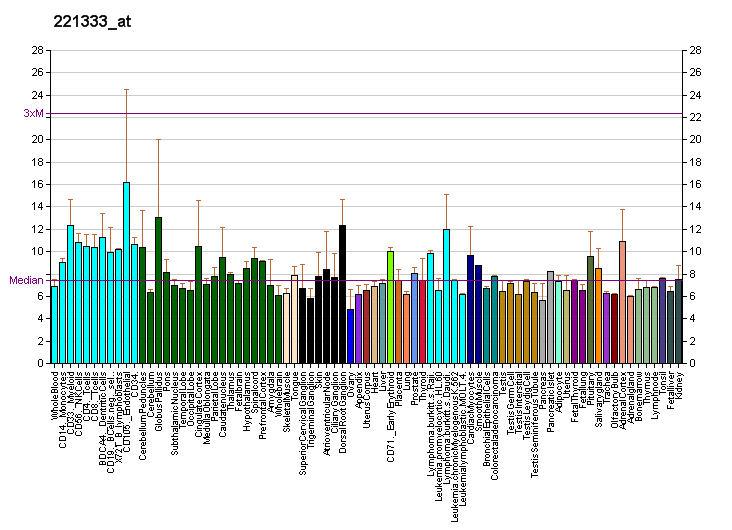

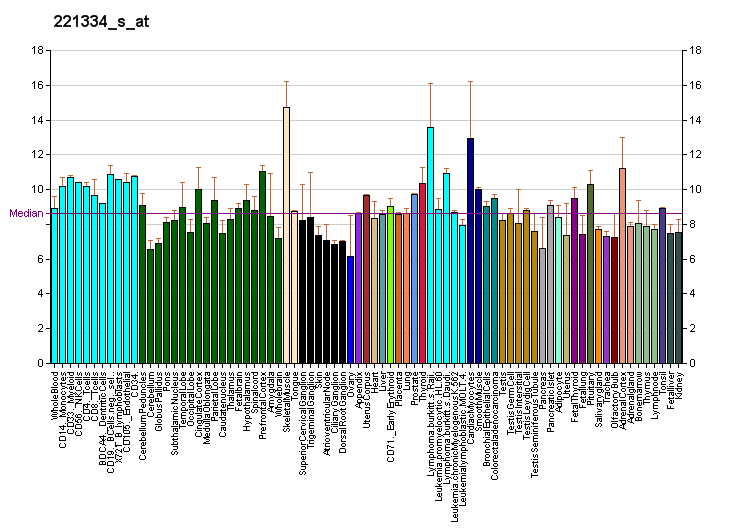
RNA expression pattern
Bgee	Human / Mouse (ortholog); Top expressed in: gonad; testicle; tendon of biceps brachii; lymph node; cecum; appendix; blood; tonsil; gallbladder; granulocyte / Top expressed in: urethra; male urethra; blastocyst; embryo; pharynx; thymus; meninges; tail of embryo; dentate gyrus of hippocampal formation granule cell; neural layer of retina; More reference expression data
BioGPS	More reference expression data
Gene ontology
Molecular function	sequence-specific DNA binding; NF-kappaB binding; transcription corepressor activity; nucleic acid binding; transcription factor activity, RNA polymerase II distal enhancer sequence-specific binding; protein binding; histone deacetylase binding; DNA-binding transcription factor activity; NFAT protein binding; histone acetyltransferase binding; metal ion binding; DNA binding; protein homodimerization activity; DNA-binding transcription factor activity, RNA polymerase II-specific; RNA polymerase II cis-regulatory region sequence-specific DNA binding
Cellular component	nucleus; intracellular anatomical structure; cytoplasm; nucleoplasm; protein-containing complex
Biological process	negative regulation of cell population proliferation; negative regulation of NF-kappaB transcription factor activity; B cell homeostasis; regulation of isotype switching to IgG isotypes; myeloid cell homeostasis; negative regulation of inflammatory response; positive regulation of interleukin-4 production; regulation of immunoglobulin production; regulation of transcription by RNA polymerase II; regulation of T cell anergy; negative regulation of interleukin-6 production; tolerance induction to self antigen; regulation of transcription, DNA-templated; negative regulation of DNA-binding transcription factor activity; positive regulation of T cell tolerance induction; negative regulation of immune response; negative regulation of interferon-gamma production; tolerance induction; regulatory T cell differentiation; positive regulation of transcription, DNA-templated; negative regulation of interleukin-2 production; positive regulation of histone acetylation; negative regulation of interleukin-5 production; negative regulation of chronic inflammatory response; CD4-positive, CD25-positive, alpha-beta regulatory T cell differentiation; positive regulation of transcription by RNA polymerase II; negative regulation of activated T cell proliferation; positive regulation of gene expression; negative regulation of interleukin-4 production; negative regulation of interleukin-10 production; negative regulation of tumor necrosis factor production; T cell homeostasis; negative regulation of CREB transcription factor activity; negative regulation of T-helper 17 cell differentiation; T cell activation; positive regulation of immature T cell proliferation in thymus; positive regulation of regulatory T cell differentiation; negative regulation of transcription by RNA polymerase II; positive regulation of peripheral T cell tolerance induction; positive regulation of transforming growth factor beta1 production; negative regulation of transcription, DNA-templated; negative regulation of lymphocyte proliferation; negative regulation of histone acetylation; negative regulation of interleukin-17 production; response to virus; negative regulation of histone deacetylation; CD4-positive, CD25-positive, alpha-beta regulatory T cell lineage commitment; positive regulation of CD4-positive, CD25-positive, alpha-beta regulatory T cell differentiation; negative regulation of T cell proliferation; chromatin remodeling; cytokine production; negative regulation of T cell cytokine production; negative regulation of isotype switching to IgE isotypes; T cell receptor signaling pathway; positive regulation of T cell anergy; transcription, DNA-templated; T cell mediated immunity; negative regulation of gene expression; anatomical structure morphogenesis; regulation of Wnt signaling pathway; regulation of regulatory T cell differentiation
Sources:Amigo / QuickGO
Orthologs
Databases	NCBI: entry; OMA: entry
Species	Human	Mouse
Entrez	50943	20371
Ensembl	ENSG00000049768	ENSMUSG00000039521
UniProt	Q9BZS1	Q99JB6
RefSeq (mRNA)	NM_001114377; NM_014009	NM_001199347; NM_001199348; NM_054039
RefSeq (protein)	NP_001107849; NP_054728	NP_001186276; NP_001186277; NP_473380
Location (UCSC)	Chr X: 49.25 – 49.27 Mb	Chr X: 7.44 – 7.46 Mb
PubMed search
- Wikidata
View/Edit Human	View/Edit Mouse

FOXP3 (forkhead box P3), also known as scurfin, is a protein involved in immune system responses. A member of the FOX protein family, FOXP3 appears to function as a master regulator of the regulatory pathway in the development and function of regulatory T cells. Regulatory T cells generally turn the immune response down. In cancer, an excess of regulatory T cell activity can prevent the immune system from destroying cancer cells. In autoimmune disease, a deficiency of regulatory T cell activity can allow other autoimmune cells to attack the body's own tissues.

While the precise control mechanism has not yet been established, FOX proteins belong to the forkhead/winged-helix family of transcriptional regulators and are presumed to exert control via similar DNA binding interactions during transcription. In regulatory T cell model systems, the FOXP3 transcription factor occupies the promoters for genes involved in regulatory T-cell function, and may inhibit transcription of key genes following stimulation of T cell receptors.

In October 2025, Mary E. Brunkow, Fred Ramsdell and Shimon Sakaguchi were awarded the Nobel Prize in Physiology or Medicine for their work on FOXP3, T-cells and the regulation of the immune system.

== Structure ==
The human FOXP3 genes contain 11 coding exons. Exon-intron boundaries are identical across the coding regions of the mouse and human genes. By genomic sequence analysis, the FOXP3 gene maps to the p arm of the X chromosome (specifically, Xp11.23).

== Identification ==
A 2001 Nature Genetics paper identified the scurfy gene product, initially termed scurfin and later known as FOXP3, linking its disruption to a fatal lymphoproliferative disorder in mice.

== Physiology ==
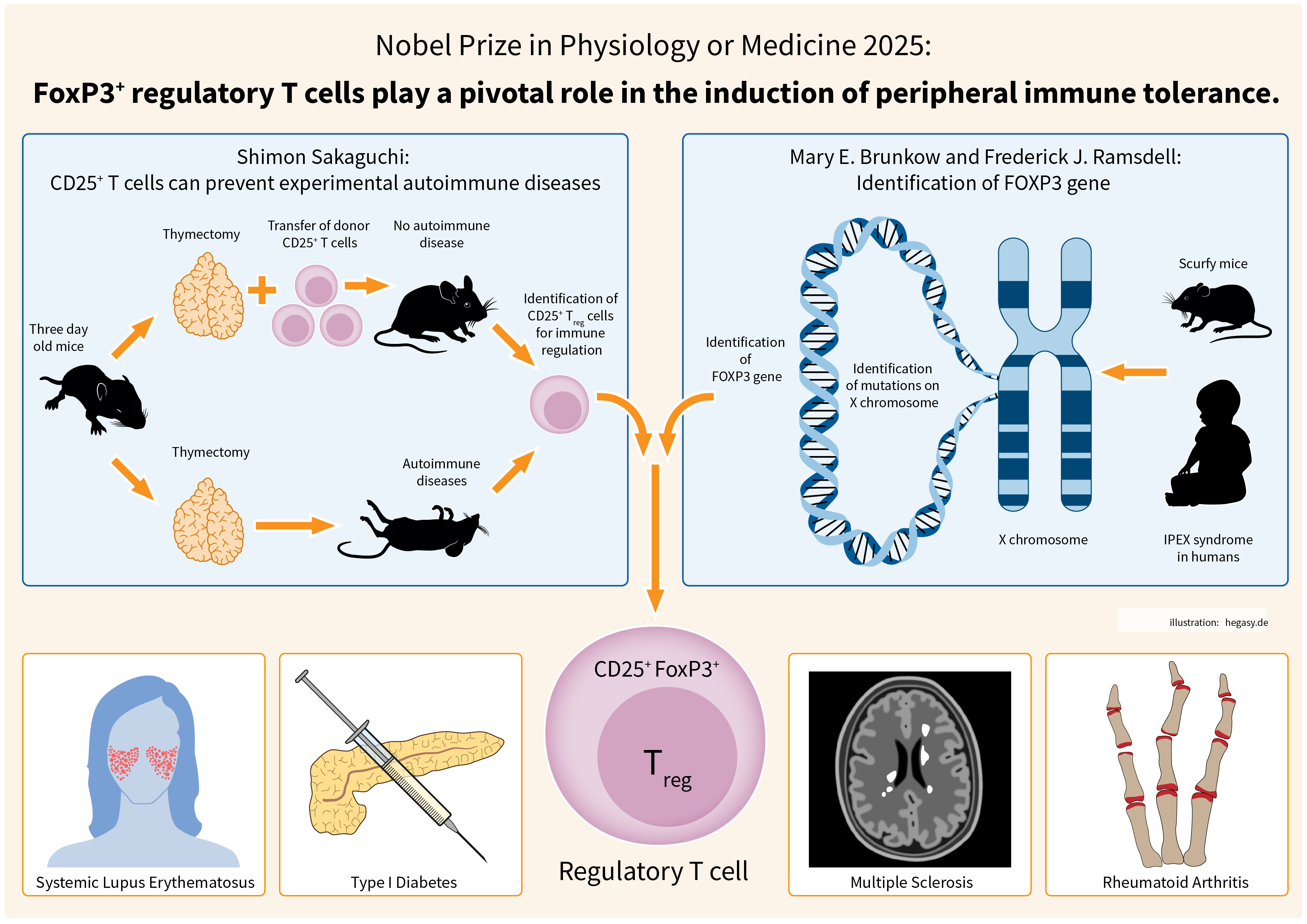
Pivotal role of FOXP3^{+} T_{reg} cells in peripheral immune tolerance – Nobel Prize in Physiology or Medicine 2025

FOXP3 is a specific marker of natural T regulatory cells (nTregs, a lineage of T cells) and adaptive or induced T regulatory cells (aTregs or iTregs), also identified by other less specific markers such as CD25 or CD45RB. In animal studies, Tregs that express FOXP3 are critical in the transfer of immune tolerance, especially self-tolerance.

The induction or administration of FOXP3 positive T cells has, in animal studies, led to marked reductions in (autoimmune) disease severity in models of diabetes, multiple sclerosis, asthma, inflammatory bowel disease, thyroiditis and renal disease. Human trials using regulatory T cells to treat graft-versus-host disease have shown efficacy.

Further work has shown that T cells are more plastic in nature than originally thought. This means that the use of regulatory T cells in therapy may be risky, as the T regulatory cell transferred to the patient may change into T helper 17 (Th17) cells, which are pro-inflammatory rather than regulatory cells. Th17 cells are proinflammatory and are produced under similar environments as aTregs and iTregs. Th17 cells are produced under the influence of TGF-β and IL-6 (or IL-21), whereas aTregs or iTregs are produced under the influence of solely TGF-β, so the difference between a proinflammatory and a pro-regulatory scenario is the presence of a single interleukin. IL-6 or IL-21 is being debated by immunology laboratories as the definitive signaling molecule. Murine studies point to IL-6 whereas human studies have shown IL-21. Foxp3 is the major transcription factor controlling T-regulatory cells (T_{reg} or CD4^{+} cells). CD4^{+} cells are leukocytes responsible for protecting animals from foreign invaders such as bacteria and viruses. Defects in this gene's ability to function can cause IPEX syndrome (IPEX), also known as X-linked autoimmunity-immunodeficiency syndrome as well as numerous cancers. While CD4^{+} cells are heavily regulated and require multiple transcription factors such as STAT-5 and AhR in order to become active and function properly, FOXP3 has been identified as the master regulator for T_{reg} lineage. FOXP3 can either act as a transcriptional activator or suppressor depending on what regulators such as deacetylases and histone acetylases are acting on it. The FOXP3 gene is also known to convert naïve T-cells to T_{reg} cells, which are capable of in vivo and in vitro suppressive capabilities suggesting that FOXP3 is capable of regulating the expression of suppression-mediating molecules. Clarifying the gene targets of FOXP3 could be crucial to the comprehension of the suppressive abilities of T_{reg} cells.

== Pathophysiology ==
In human disease, alterations in numbers of regulatory T cells – and in particular those that express FOXP3 – are found in a number of disease states. For example, patients with tumors have a local relative excess of FOXP3 positive T cells which inhibits the body's ability to suppress the formation of cancerous cells. Conversely, patients with an autoimmune disease such as systemic lupus erythematosus (SLE) have a relative dysfunction of FOXP3 positive cells. The FOXP3 gene is also mutated in IPEX syndrome (initialism of Immunodysregulation, Polyendocrinopathy, and Enteropathy, X-linked). Many patients with IPEX have mutations in the DNA-binding forkhead domain of FOXP3.

In mice, a FOXP3 mutation (a frameshift mutation that result in protein lacking the forkhead domain) is responsible for 'Scurfy', an X-linked recessive mouse mutant that results in lethality in hemizygous males 16 to 25 days after birth. These mice have overproliferation of CD4^{+} T-lymphocytes, extensive multiorgan infiltration, and elevation of numerous cytokines. This phenotype is similar to those that lack expression of CTLA-4, TGF-β, human disease IPEX, or deletion of the FOXP3 gene in mice ("scurfy mice"). The pathology observed in scurfy mice seems to result from an inability to properly regulate CD4^{+} T-cell activity. In mice overexpressing the FOXP3 gene, fewer T cells are observed. The remaining T cells have poor proliferative and cytolytic responses and poor interleukin-2 production, although thymic development appears normal. Histologic analysis indicates that peripheral lymphoid organs, particularly lymph nodes, lack the proper number of cells.

== Role in cancer ==
In addition to FOXP3's role in regulatory T cell differentiation, multiple lines of evidence have indicated that FOXP3 play important roles in cancer development.

Down-regulation of FOXP3 expression has been reported in tumour specimens derived from breast, prostate, and ovarian cancer patients, indicating that FOXP3 is a potential tumour suppressor gene. Expression of FOXP3 was also detected in tumour specimens derived from additional cancer types, including pancreatic, melanoma, liver, bladder, thyroid, cervical cancers. However, in these reports, no corresponding normal tissues were analyzed, therefore it remained unclear whether FOXP3 is a pro- or anti-tumourigeneic molecule in these tumours.

Two lines of functional evidence strongly supported that FOXP3 serves as a tumour suppressive transcription factor in cancer development. First, FOXP3 represses expression of HER2, Skp2, SATB1 and MYC oncogenes and induces expression of tumour suppressor genes P21 and LATS2 in breast and prostate cancer cells. Second, over-expression of FOXP3 in melanoma, glioma, breast, prostate and ovarian cancer cell lines induces profound growth inhibitory effects in vitro and in vivo. However, this hypothesis need to be further investigated in future studies.

FOXP3 is a recruiter of other anti-tumor enzymes such as CD39 and CD8. The overexpression of CD39 is found in patients with multiple cancer types such as melanoma, leukemia, pancreatic cancer, colon cancer, and ovarian cancer. This overexpression may be protecting tumorous cells, allowing them to create their "escape phase". A cancerous tumor's "escape phase" is where the tumor grows quickly and it becomes clinically invisible by becoming independent of the extracellular matrix and creating its own immunosuppressive tumor microenvironment. The consequences of a cancer cell reaching the "escape phase" is that it allows it to completely evade the immune system, which reduces the immunogenicity and ability to become clinically detected, allowing it to progress and spread throughout the body. Some cancer patients have also been known to display higher numbers of mutated CD4^{+} cells. These mutated cells will then produce large quantities of TGF-β and IL-10, (a Transforming Growth Factor β and an inhibitory cytokine respectively,) which will suppress signals to the immune system and allow for tumor escape. So, FOXP3 polymorphism (rs3761548) might contribute to cancer development like gastric cancer through influencing Treg cell activity and secretion of immunomodulatory cytokines such as IL-10, IL-35, and TGF-β. In one experiment a 15-mer synthetic peptide, P60, was able to inhibit FOXP3's ability to function. P60 did this by entering the cells and then binding to FOXP3, where it hinders FOXP3's ability to translocate to the nucleus. Due to this, FOXP3 could no longer properly suppress the transcription factors NF-kB and NFAT; both of which are protein complexes that regulate transcription of DNA, cytokine production and cell survival. This would inhibit a cell's ability to perform apoptosis and stop its own cell cycle, which could potentially allow an affected cancerous cell to survive and reproduce.

== Autoimmune ==
Mutations or disruptions of the FOXP3 regulatory pathway can lead to organ-specific autoimmune diseases such as autoimmune thyroiditis and type 1 diabetes mellitus. These mutations affect thymocytes developing within the thymus. Regulated by FOXP3, it's these thymocytes that during thymopoiesis, are transformed into mature Treg cells by the thymus. It was found that patients who have the autoimmune disease systemic lupus erythematosus (SLE) possess FOXP3 mutations that affect the thymopoiesis process, preventing the proper development of T_{reg} cells within the thymus. These malfunctioning T_{reg} cells aren't efficiently being regulated by its transcription factors, which cause them to attack cells that are healthy, leading to these organ-specific autoimmune diseases. Another way that FOXP3 helps keep the autoimmune system at homeostasis is through its regulation of the expression of suppression-mediating molecules. For instance, FOXP3 is able to facilitate the translocation of extracellular adenosine into the cytoplasm. It does this by recruiting CD39, a rate-limiting enzyme that's vital in tumor suppression to hydrolyze ATP to ADP in order to regulate immunosuppression on different cell populations.

== See also ==
- Autoimmune regulator (AIRE)
- Autoimmunity
- Central tolerance
- Immunity
- IPEX syndrome
- Lymphocytes
- Thymocyte
