= Richard K. Gershon =

- Born: December 24, 1932; New York City, United States
- Died: July 11, 1983 (aged 50); New Haven, Connecticut
- Occupation(s): immunologist pathologist

Academic background
- Education: Harvard University

Academic work
- Doctoral students: Douglas R. Green (1981)

Richard K. Gershon (24 December 1932 – 11 July 1983) was an American immunologist and pathologist, and professor at Yale School of Medicine.

== Biography ==
He graduated from Harvard University in 1954, and was noted for his work on tumor biology and viral hepatitis.

In 1980, he was made a member of the National Academy of Sciences.

At Yale, among others, he collaborated with Włodzimierz Ptak, who recalled Gershon as a true friend and one of the most intellectually related and valued people.

He died of lung cancer.

== Awards ==
- Gairdner Foundation International Award (1983)
- William B. Coley Award (1983)
