= Włodzimierz Ptak =

Polish immunologist and microbiologist (1928–2019)

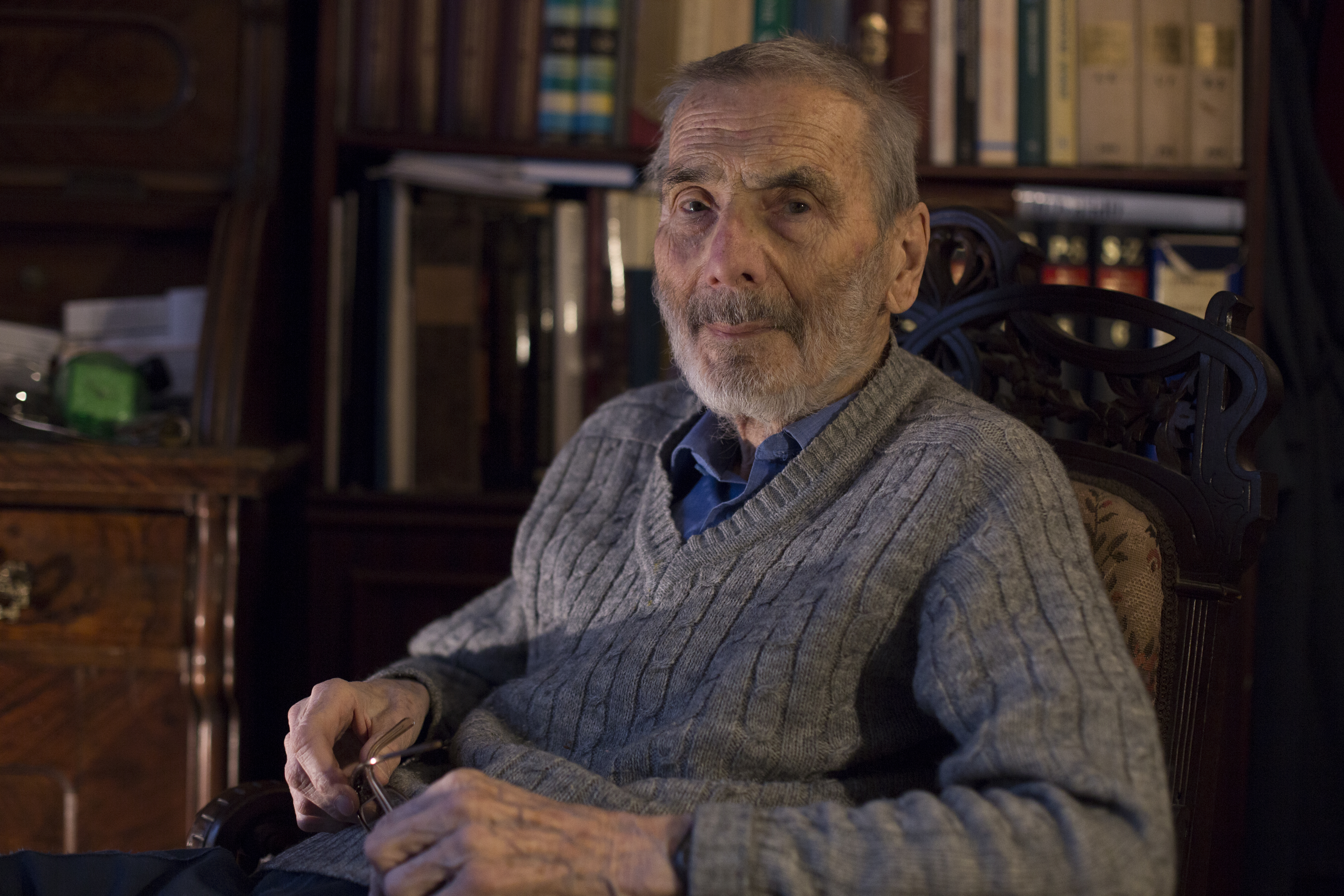
- Born: Włodzimierz Wojciech Ptak; 2 November 1928; Kraków
- Died: 28 May 2019 (aged 90); Kraków
- Citizenship: Polish
- Education: Medical Academy in Kraków; Medical Academy in Szczecin
- Occupations: immunologist microbiologist

Włodzimierz Wojciech Ptak (2 November 1928 – 28 May 2019) was a Polish immunologist and microbiologist, professor of medical sciences, member of the Polish Academy of Sciences and the Polish Academy of Learning, professor and Vice-Rector at the Medical Academy in Kraków, later transformed into the Jagiellonian University Medical College, visiting professor at Yale University.

In his scientific work, he studied mainly the regulatory mechanisms of the immune response. Together with Richard K. Gershon, he co-authored the discovery of regulatory T cells. He published more than two hundred research papers, and was one of the most frequently cited Polish scientists in the field of biomedicine after 1965.

A graduate of the Medical Academy in Kraków, he was forcibly drafted into the Polish Army between 1952 and 1957. He obtained Ph.D. in 1962 at the Medical Academy in Szczecin. In 1967, he received British Council scholarship to the National Institute for Medical Research in London.

From 1974 until 1999, he was a visiting professor at Yale University, meanwhile standing as the Vice-Rector of the Medical Academy in Kraków (1978–1981) and a member of the Presidium of the International Union of Immunological Societies (1983–1986). He was a member of the Presidium (1978–1984) and a Chairman (1988–1990) of the Scientific Council by the Minister of Health and Welfare of Poland. Later, he was appointed a Secretary (1989–1995) and vice-president (until 2008) of the Medical Faculty of the Polish Academy of Learning.

He received several awards and state distinctions, including the Knight's Cross (1977) and the Commander's Cross (1997) of the Polonia Restituta.

== Life and work ==
=== 1928–1952: Youth ===
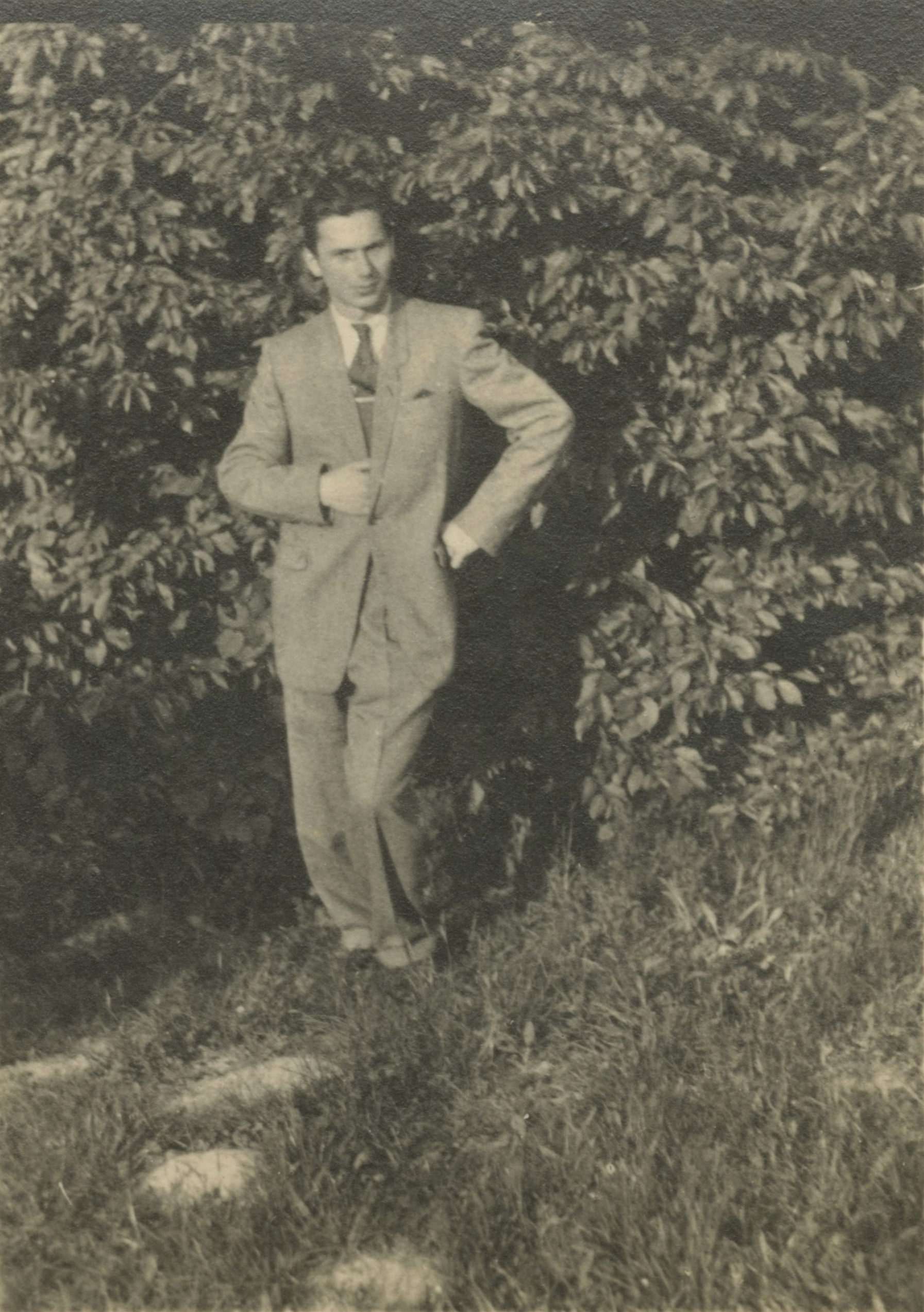
Ptak's interests began to focus on microbiology and bacteriology at the end of his medical studies. Shortly after the graduation, he was forcibly drafted into the Polish Army, where he spent five years. Above: Ptak photographed in 1950s

He was born in 1928 in Kraków as the son of Wojciech Ptak (1888–1946), an engineer and a graduate of the Lviv Polytechnic, and Maria Ptak (née Krawczyk; 1904–1986), an employee in kasa chorych, a public health insurance corporation. The father, as his son recalled, was a tough, demanding and strict man, fluent in French and German language.

His grandparents were Franciszek Ptak (1859–1936), an innkeeper, peasant movement activist and a member of the Diet of Galicia and Lodomeria, and Józef Krawczyk (1865–1942), a foreman in the cigarette factory “Cygar fabryka” at Dolnych Młynów Street in Kraków.

Włodzimierz had a younger sister, Wanda Ptak-Kollat (1930–1984), a master engineer in roads and bridges and a graduate of Kraków Polytechnic.

In 1936, Wojciech Ptak was offered a work in high office in the French-Polish railway company in Bydgoszcz, hence the Ptak family moved there. In Bydgoszcz Włodzimierz Ptak befriended with Czesław Radzikowski. In 1939, after the outbreak of World War II, the Ptaks returned to Kraków, as Włodzimierz recalled: “We returned from a four-room apartment to a single room with a kitchen. We've lost everything. My father fell ill. He died of a heart attack just after the war, before my high school graduation.”

In his youth, Włodzimierz Ptak learned to play the violin. As a child, he attended the Bydgoszcz Conservatory of Music. As a teenager, in German-occupied Kraków, he was a student of Stanisław Syrewicz, the concert master of the Kraków Philharmonic. At the time, he attended the trade school at Brzozowa Street in Kraków, also taking secret Latin lessons from professor Pardiak.

From an early age, he was interested in biology and astronomy. He read a lot about nature. The book that he said attracted his attention particularly was The Natural History of One Protozoan by Jan Dembowski. As a boy, Włodzimierz kept himself a large collection of protozoa at home, and next to it a dog, a cat, a canary, a fish and a white mouse. Together with a friend of his, using glasses purchased at a local optical store, they constructed a simple telescope to observe the night sky.

From 1943, Ptak worked physically at the construction of the road from Dębniki to Prokocim, and later as a hand of a car mechanic in a workshop at Grzegórzecka Street in Kraków. He recalled: “During the war, when I was thirteen, I was searching through my grandfather's large library, and I came across a book that largely influenced the formation of my worldview. The Studies on Social Doctrines of Christianity by Yves Guyot contributed to the fact that I am irreligious.”

Ptak attended the Jan III Sobieski High School in Kraków, but due to a conflict with a mathematics teacher in the final year, he moved to the Henryk Sienkiewicz High School. There, he passed the matura exam in 1946.

Also in 1946, he enrolled to the medical studies at the Medical Academy in Kraków. There, among his teachers was Henryk Niewodniczański, who awarded Ptak with an excellent degree in exam in physics. At the end of the studies, Ptak's interests began to focus primarily on microbiology and bacteriology. He graduated in 1952.

During the studies, to support himself financially, he founded a music group with colleagues from different universities, and earned money by playing at seasonal parties and weddings.

=== 1952–1970: In the army, Ph.D. ===
In 1952, immediately after the graduation, Ptak was forcibly drafted into the Polish People's Army. (Note: In the communist Poland, early 1950s was a period of intensified military conscription due to the outbreak of the Korean War. Ptak shared the fate of many Polish youth.) Soon after, he was transferred to the Służba Polsce (Service to Poland; SP), a state paramilitary organization for young people. Ptak spent a total of five years in the army and SP.

He received an initial allocation in Jelenia Góra, where he worked on the production of viscose fibers. Then he was accepted by Ludwik Hirszfeld as a volunteer at the Institute of Immunology and Experimental Therapy of the Polish Academy of Sciences, but he remained there only for a few weeks. He was transferred to Katowice, where he worked as a medical controller of the SP units in Upper Silesia and Opole. Practically, this meant constant mobility and work in various facilities throughout the region.

In 1954, Ptak was relocated to Bydgoszcz, where he worked as a pediatrician for two months, though he had no previous experience in direct work with patients. Then, at his own request, he was transferred to Szczecin, where he wanted to continue his education.

He began to write requests for release from the army. In 1955, during a two-month sick leave, he worked at the Department of Microbiology at the Medical Academy in Kraków, where he conducted research together with Jan Bóbr. In 1957, he was dismissed from the service in the army and began work at the Department of Pathology at the Medical Academy in Szczecin. There, in 1961, he submitted his doctoral thesis and moved permanently to Kraków, where his mother lived.

He obtained Ph.D. in pathology in 1962 at the Medical Academy in Szczecin. (Note: His promoter Janusz Mąkowski, as well as both reviewers, did not appear at the thesis defense. Ptak recalled: “The defense took place in a very strange way – I probably should not use the title doctor. My promoter, Prof. Mąkowski, went to Paris, and both reviewers of the thesis did not make it. (...) There was no one who knew what was the subject of the work I'd conducted and written. Dean Krechowiecki, an anatomist, however decided: << We will not send you back, I will take over the duties of your promoter >>. However, I had problems with my philosophy exam. My examiner, a philosopher in Szczecin, was a very red Marxist, and I admitted to him at once that I was a believer in logical positivism. It touched him, he started to mangle me.” (Polish scientific and academic life was at the time highly ideologized because of the primacy of Marxism–Leninism imposed by the authoritarian regime of the Polish People's Party dependent to the Soviet Union).) He recalled: “Because of the army, I was already 34 years old. I wasted five years of life. At this age two of my first collaborators were already appointed associate professors”.

In 1967, Ptak left for a ten-month British Council scholarship to the National Institute for Medical Research in London.

=== 1970–1999: Between Kraków and New Haven ===
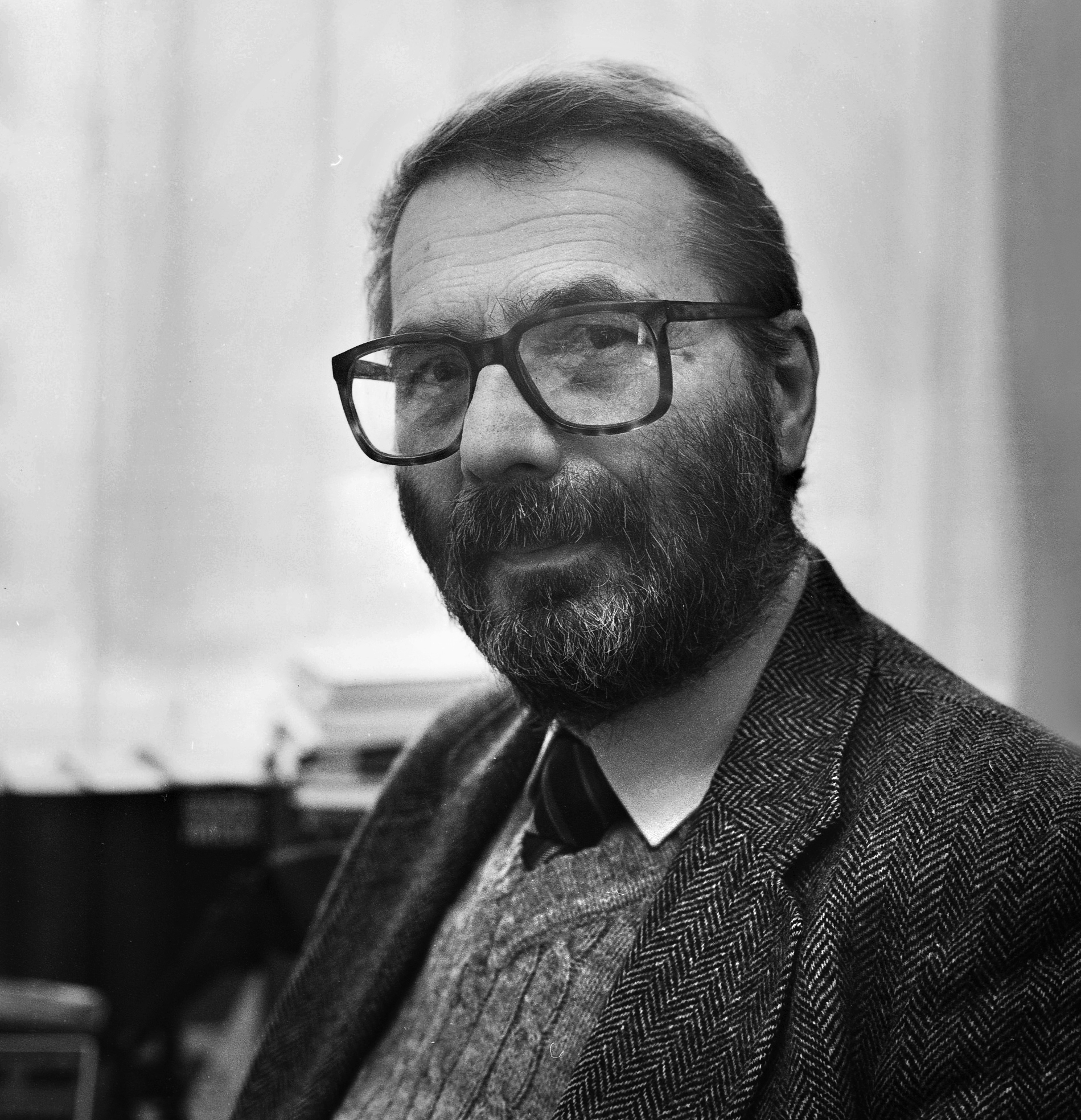
Ptak was a visiting professor at Yale University for several years. There, he worked together with Richard K. Gershon. He never moved permanently to the USA. In the picture: Ptak in his office in Kraków, 1990s

He passed his habilitation exam in the field of pathology in 1970. Julian Aleksandrowicz was one of the reviewers of his work. In 1976 Ptak was given the title of full professor.

Over the years, he held the position of deputy director of the Institute of Microbiology, Head of the Department of Experimental and Clinical Immunology of the Institute of Microbiology, and Head of the Department of Immunology of the Medical Academy in Kraków. Between 1978 and 1981, Ptak was the Vice-Rector of the Medical Academy in Kraków.

From 1974 until 1999, he was a visiting professor at the Department of Immunology, Department of Internal Medicine at Yale University. Altogether, he spent there more than seven years by submitting twenty-six visits. At Yale, his direct superior was Richard K. Gershon, with whom Ptak collaborated extensively and made friends.

Ptak believed that his frequent visits to the United States from a country of the Soviet Bloc, which Polish People's Republic then was, were enabled by the-then Rector of the Medical Academy in Kraków, Tadeusz Popiela: “It was not because the regime loved us that we left the country whenever we wanted. It was because Popiela often handed for us, and sent us on his own responsibility.”

Ptak stopped visiting Yale at the end of the 1990s, in spite of the repeated invitations. He explained it with his age: “In Kraków I can adjust my work time: three–four hours a day. There [at Yale] I worked fourteen–sixteen hours a day. That I cannot do any more.”

In 1986, he was elected a correspondent member of the Polish Academy of Sciences (PAN). (Note: In 1998, he was elected a real member of PAN.) In 1989, he was elected a member of the Polish Academy of Learning.

He was a member of the Committee for Immunology of the Polish Academy of Sciences, as well as a member of the Presidium of the International Union of Immunological Societies (1983–1986). In 1989, he was elected a member of the Polish Immunological Society, that later awarded him with an honorary membership. Ptak was also a member of the Presidium (1978–1984) and Chairman (1988–1990) of the Scientific Council by the Minister of Health and Welfare of Poland. Later, he was appointed the Secretary (1989–1995) and a vice-president (until 2008) of the Medical Faculty of the Polish Academy of Learning.

In his scientific work, he studied mainly the regulatory mechanisms of the immune response. He published more than two hundred original research papers in international peer reviewed journals, and was one of the most frequently cited Polish scientists in the field of biomedicine after 1965.

Together with Richard K. Gershon, he was the co-author of the discovery of regulatory T cells. Beside, he participated in describing the regulatory functions of gamma delta T cells, and conducted research on the mechanisms of the early phase of cellular reactions, as well as the study of the regulatory functions of small interfering RNA.

=== 1999–2019: Late work ===
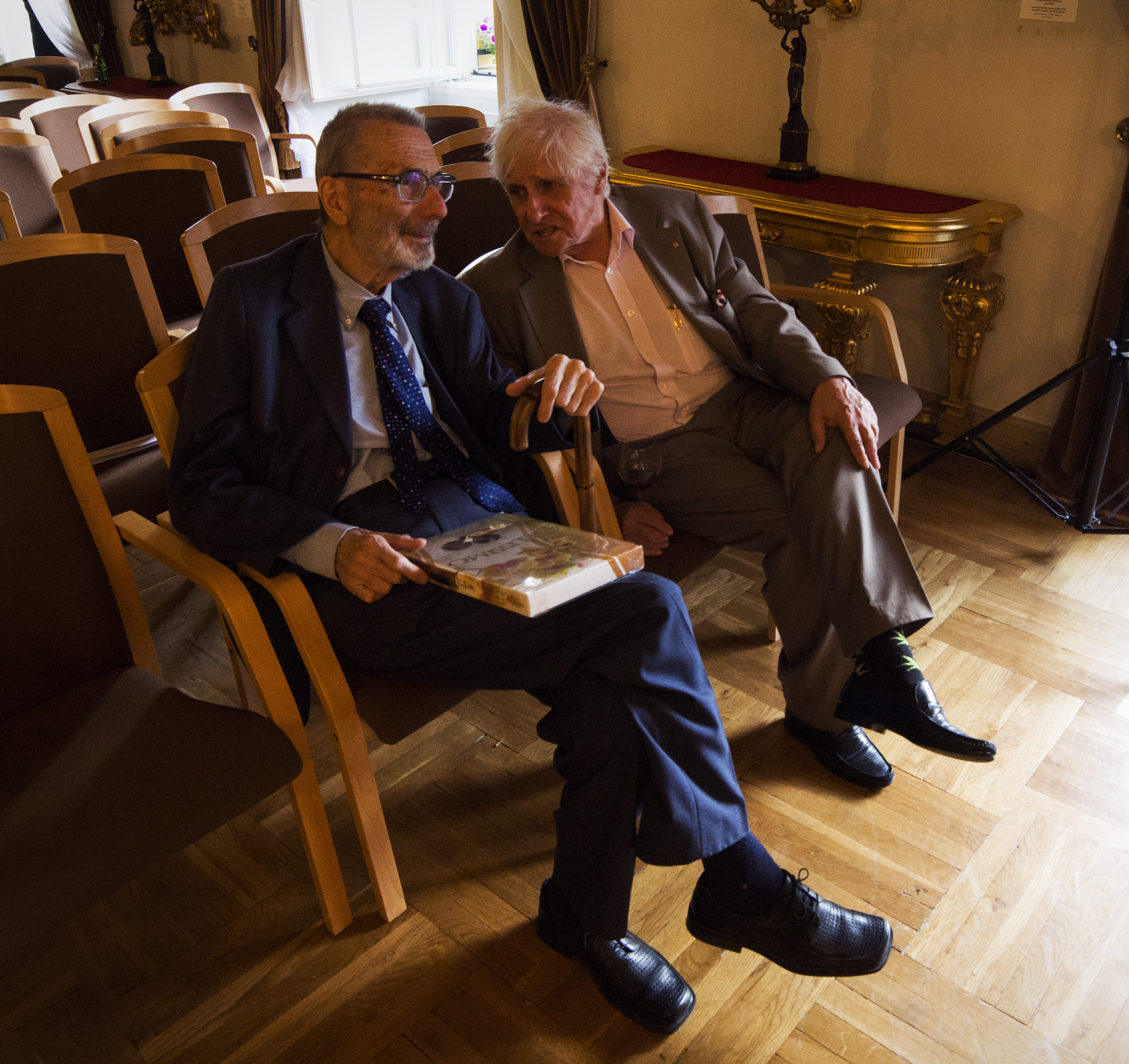
Ptak in conversation with Jerzy Vetulani, 2016

He was a member of the editorial board of the European Journal of Immunology (1985–2004), as well as a member of the Scientific Council of the Institute of Pharmacology of the Polish Academy of Sciences (1994–2018).

He authored a textbook Podstawy immunologii (Basics of Immunology) in Polish. First published in 1976, it was followed-up by a number of re-editions, co-authored with Maria Ptak and Marian Szczepanik (1987, 1999, 2009, 2017). Ptak was also active as an academic teacher. He was a promoter in ten doctoral dissertations.

He died in Kraków on 28 May 2019 at the age of 90, and was buried at the Rakowicki Cemetery on 3 June 2019, in the family grave.

=== Personal life ===
Over the years, he befriended Zbigniew Cybulski, (Note: Ptak and Cybulski both lived in the same neighbourhood. Ptak lived at Garncarska Street, and Cybulski was his neighbour around the corner, at Dolnych Młynów Street.) Adam Walaciński, Artur Maria Swinarski (in the 1950s), Franciszek Studnicki, Adam Macedoński (in the 1960s), Krzysztof Penderecki and Alexander Schenker (in the 1970s).

He was an atheist and defined his worldview as leftist. Among his hobbies were, among others, history, religion studies and philosophy. He was cast in a small role in a 2016 short film Hens (Kury). He was married three times, and had one daughter in the second marriage.

== Selected papers ==
- Ptak W, Festenstein H, Asherson GL, Denman AM (1969). "Improved graft survival after treatment with Bordetella and anti-lymphocyte serum". Nature. 222 (5198): 1083–5. Bibcode:1969Natur.222.1083P. doi:10.1038/2221083a0. PMID 4306798. S2CID 4164741.
- Ptak W, Porwit-Bóbr Z, Chlap Z (1970). "Transformation of hamster macrophages into giant cells with antimacrophage serum". Nature. 225 (5233): 655–657. Bibcode:1970Natur.225..655P. doi:10.1038/225655a0. PMID 5413378. S2CID 4192876.
- Ptak W, Gershon RK (1975). "Immunosuppression effected by macrophage surfaces". Journal of Immunology. 115 (5): 1346–50. doi:10.4049/jimmunol.115.5.1346. PMID 809511. S2CID 7144999.
- Ptak W, Rozycka D, Askenase PW, Gershon RK (1980). "Role of antigen-presenting cells in the development and persistence of contact hypersensitivity". Journal of Experimental Medicine. 151 (2): 362–75. doi:10.1084/jem.151.2.362. PMC 2185775. PMID 7356727.
- Ptak W, Bereta M, Ptak M, Gershon RK, Green DR (1984). "Antigen-specific T contrassupressor factor in cell-mediated immunity: intereractions leading to eradication of the tolerant state". Journal of Immunology. 133.
- Ptak W, Szczepanik M, Ramabhadran R, Askenase PW (1996). "Immune or normal gamma-delta T cells that assist alpha beta T cell in elicitation of contact sensitivity preferentially use Vγ5 and Vδ4 variable region gene segments". Journal of Immunology. 156 (3): 976–86. doi:10.4049/jimmunol.156.3.976. PMID 8558025. S2CID 20851348.
- Ptak W, Majewska M, Bryniarski K, Ptak M, Lobo FM, Zajac K, Askenase PW, Szczepanik M (2009). "Epicutaneous immunization with protein antigen in the presence of TLR4 ligand induces TCR alpha beta+CD4+ T contrasuppressor cells that reverse skin-induced suppression of Th1-mediated contact sensitivity". Journal of Immunology. 182 (2): 837–50. doi:10.4049/jimmunol.182.2.837. PMID 19124727.

== Awards and honors ==
- Minister of Health of Poland Award, first degree (seven times, 1973–2009)
- Scientific Secretary of the Polish Academy of Sciences Award (1973, 1984)
- Knight's Cross of Polonia Restituta (1977)
- Jędrzej Śniadecki Award (1978)
- Alfred Jurzykowski Foundation Award (1981)
- Award of the Faculty of Medical Sciences of the Polish Academy of Sciences, first degree (1982)
- State Prize of the Polish People's Republic (1984)
- Meritorious Teacher of the Polish People's Republic Award (1984)
- “Gloria Medicinae” Medal awarded by the Polish Medical Association (1992)
- Prime Minister of Poland Award (1996)
- Commander's Cross of Polonia Restituta (1998)
- Minister of National Education of Poland Award (1999)
- Jagiellonian Laurel awarded by the Jagiellonian University (1999)
- Honoris Gratia Medal awarded by the President of Kraków (2016)

== Bibliography ==
- Wielka Encyklopedia PWN. Vol. 22. Warszawa: Polish Scientific Publishers PWN. 2004. p. 519. ISBN 83-01-14116-6.
- "Ptak Włodzimierz Wojciech". Encyklopedia Krakowa. Vol. 2. Kraków: Biblioteka Kraków, Muzeum Krakowa. 2023. p. 312.
