= Douglas R. Green =

American immunologist (born 1955)

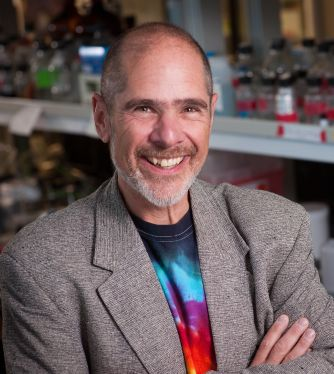
- Born: Douglas R Green; February 1955 (age 71); United States
- Known for: Apoptosis research
- Scientific career
- Fields: Cell Death, Cancer Biology, Immunology
- Workplaces: St. Jude Children's Research Hospital
- Thesis: Contrasuppression: An Immunoregulatory T Cell Activity (1981)
- Doctoral advisor: Richard K. Gershon
- Website: www.stjude.org/green

Douglas Green (born 1955), is an American biologist. He holds the Peter C. Doherty Endowed Chair of Immunology in St. Jude Children's Research Hospital. His research has focused on the process of active cell death and cell survival, extending from the role of cell death in cancer regulation and immune responses in the whole organism to the molecular events directing the death of the cell. Green was editor in chief of the journal Oncogene from 2009-2016, is a Deputy Editor of the journal "Science Advances" and the author of the book Cell Death, Means To An End.

== Education ==
Green attended Ashland High School in 1973. He then graduated magna cum laude from the Yale University with a Bachelor of Science in Biology in 1977. After training at the Massachusetts Institute of Technology for the next two years, Green graduated from Yale with a PhD in 1981, where he studied immunology with Richard K. Gershon.

Green joined the faculty at the University of Alberta in 1985. In 1990, Green moved to the La Jolla Institute for Allergy and Immunology, where he became Head of the Division of Cellular Immunology. In 2005, he moved to St. Jude Children's Research Hospital to become the Peter C. Doherty Endowed Chair of the Department of Immunology.

== Research ==
After many studies on immunological tolerance, Green's work on cell death began with his discovery of activation-induced apoptosis in T lymphocytes, the role of c-Myc in this process and the finding that Bcl-2 cooperates with Myc in oncogenesis by blocking apoptosis. More recently, he discovered the process of LC3-associated phagocytosis, which links the autophagy pathway to phagosome maturation. Other areas of interest include regulated necrosis, metabolic reprogramming in T lymphocytes, and the function of the tumor suppressor, p53. As of 2014 he had published many chapters and books and over 500 papers, making him one of the world's most cited molecular biologists. He is listed in:

- ISI "highly cited" (Immunology 2003)
- ISI "highly cited" (Molecular Biology/Genetics 2014)

== Recognition ==
Green has received many awards, among these the E.J. Boell Award (Biology) (Yale, 1977), the J.S. Nicholas Award (Zoology) (Yale, 1981), Alberta Heritage Scholar (AHFMR 1985-1990), the Outstanding Teacher Award (Alberta, 1990), Ashland Public School System Hall of Fame (Ashland, MA 1998), MERIT Award, NIGMS (2002), the International Cell Death Society Prize (2009), Einstein Professorship (China, 2011). He is an Honorary Fellow of Trinity College, Dublin (2010) and Dottore Honoris Causa of Rome University Tor Vergata (2016). Green was elected to the Royal Society of Canada in 2018, the United States National Academy of Sciences in 2020, and the American Association for the Advancement of Science (AAAS) Fellow in 2021. In 1998, he was inducted into the Ashland High School Hall of Fame.
