= Raciborowice, Lesser Poland Voivodeship =

Raciborowice
- Village
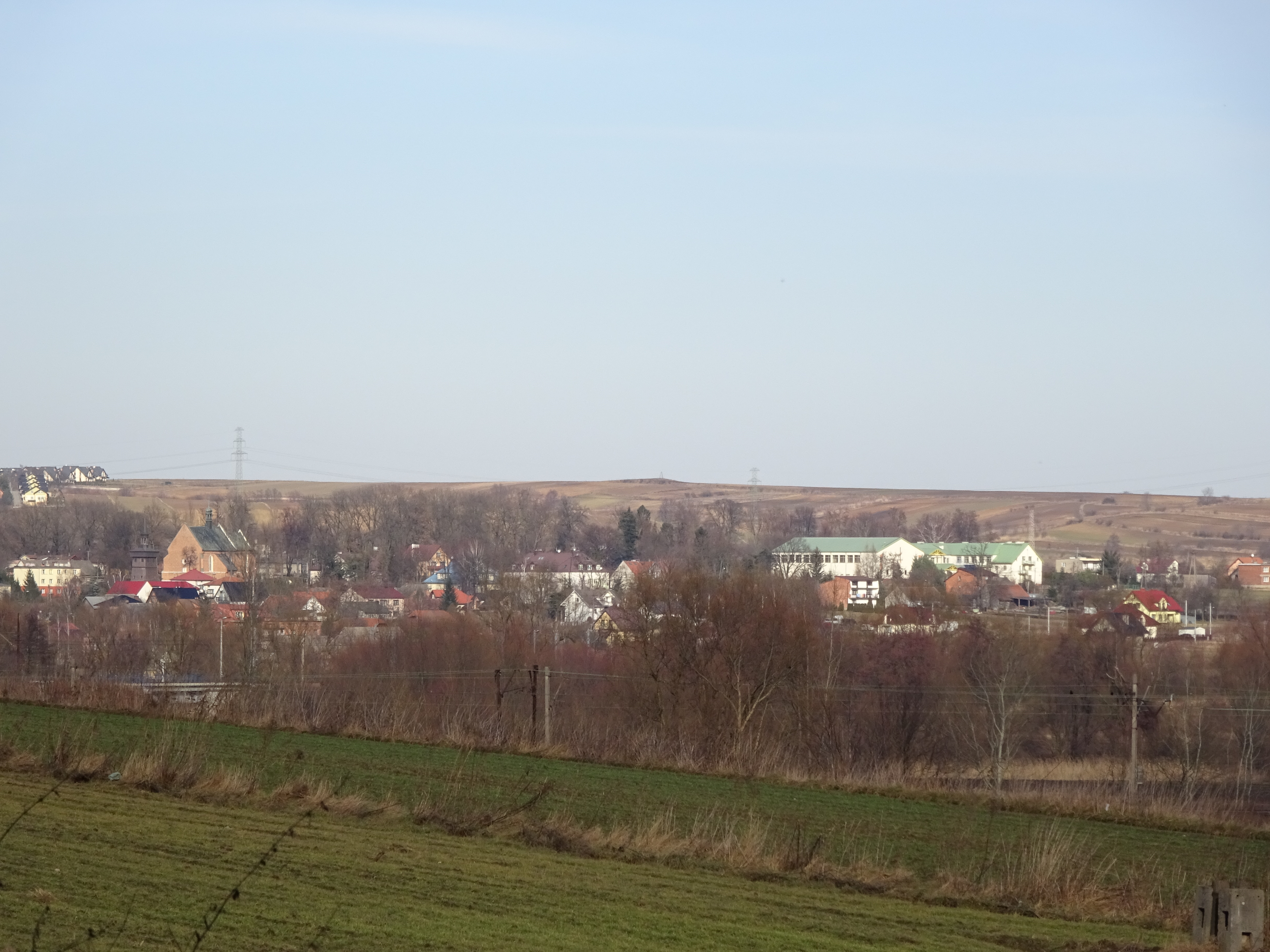

- Location within Poland
- Coordinates: 50°7′0″N 20°1′50″E
- Country: Poland
- Voivodeship: Lesser Poland
- County: Kraków
- Gmina: Michałowice
- Time zone: UTC+1 (CET)
  - Summer (DST): UTC+2 (CEST)
- Vehicle registration: KRA

Raciborowice [rat͡ɕibɔrɔˈvit͡sɛ] is a village in the administrative district of Gmina Michałowice, within Kraków County, Lesser Poland Voivodeship, in southern Poland.
