= De Quervain =

De Quervain may refer to:

== People ==
- Dominique de Quervain, Swiss neuroscientist
- Fritz de Quervain, Swiss surgeon

== Healthcare ==
- De Quervain syndrome a form of tendinosis, named after Fritz de Quervain
- De Quervain's thyroiditis, named after Fritz de Quervain
