= Burkhard =

Burkhard may refer to:

- Burkhard (given name)
- Burkhard (surname)
