= Bristol-Myers Squibb Awards =

Annual awards for scientific research (1977–2006)

Between 1977 and 2006, the Bristol-Myers Squibb Foundation presented annual awards of US$50,000 to scientists for distinguished achievements in fields such as cancer, infectious disease, neuroscience, nutrition, and cardiovascular disease. The recipients of these awards were selected by pre-eminent members of each field and past award recipients. Bristol-Myers Squibb had no role in determining the recipients of the awards.

== Bristol-Myers Squibb Award for Distinguished Achievement in Cancer Research ==
2006	Susan Band Horwitz, Ph.D.
2005	Alfred G. Knudson Jr., M.D., Ph.D.
2004	John Mendelsohn, M.D
2003	Elizabeth H. Blackburn, Ph.D.
2002	Robert C. Young, M.D. and Robert F. Ozols, M.D., Ph.D.
2001	V. Craig Jordan, Ph.D., D.Sc.
2000	David H. Beach, Ph.D., and Charles J. Sherr, M.D., Ph.D.
1999	Isaiah J. Fidler, DVM, Ph.D.
1998	Michael B. Sporn, M.D
1997	Stanley J. Korsmeyer, M.D
1996	Henry T. Lynch, M.D.
1995	Judah Folkman, M.D
1994	Arnold J. Levine, Ph.D.
1993	Gianni Bonadonna, M.D. and Bernard Fisher, M.D.
1992	Thomas A. Waldmann, M.D.
1991	Edward E. Harlow Jr., Ph.D.
1990	Bert Vogelstein, M.D.
1989	Peter K. Vogt, Ph.D.
1988	George W. Santos, M.D.
1987	Donald Metcalf, M.D.
1986	Susumu Tonegawa, Ph.D.,
1985	William S. Hayward, Ph.D., and Philip Leder, M.D.
1984	Robert A. Weinberg, Ph.D.
1983	Leo Sachs, Ph.D.
1982	Denis Parsons Burkitt, M.D and Michael Anthony Epstein, M.D., Ph.D.
1981	Van Rensselaer Potter, Ph.D.
1980	Howard E. Skipper, Ph.D.,
1979	Gertrude Henle, M.D., and Werner Henle, M.D.,
1978	Elizabeth C. Miller, Ph.D., and James A. Miller, Ph.D.

== Bristol-Myers Squibb Award for Distinguished Achievement in Nutrition Research ==
2005	Walter C. Willett, M.D., Dr.P.H.
2004	Jan-Åke Gustafsson, M.D., Ph.D.
2003	Robert J. Cousins, Ph.D.
2002	John W. Suttie, Ph.D.
2001	Alfred Sommer, M.D., M.H.S.
2000	George A. Bray, M.D.
1999	Donald B. McCormick, Ph.D.
1998	George H. Beaton, Ph.D.
1997	Scott M. Grundy, M.D., Ph.D.
1996	Irwin H. Rosenberg, M.D.
1995	Vernon R. Young, Ph.D., D.Sc.
1994	Doris Howes Calloway, Ph.D.
1993	David Mark Hegsted, Ph.D., and Ancel Keys, Ph.D.
1992	Samuel J. Fomon, M.D.
1991	Kurt J. Isselbacher, M.D.
1990	Donald B. Zilversmit, Ph.D.
1989	Richard J. Havel, M.D.
1988	Nevin S. Scrimshaw, M.D., Ph.D., M.P.H.
1987	DeWitt S. Goodman, M.D.
1986	Arvid Wretlind, M.D.
1985	Clement A. Finch, M.D.
1984	John C. Waterlow, M.D., Ph.D.
1983	Hector F. DeLuca, Ph.D.
1982	Elsie M. Widdowson, Ph.D., D.Sc.
1981	Hamish N. Munro, M.D., D.Sc.

== Bristol-Myers Squibb Award for Distinguished Achievement in Neuroscience Research ==
2005	Christine Petit, M.D., Ph.D.
2004	Thomas C. Südhof, M.D.
2003	William A. Catterall, Ph.D.
2002	Pasko Rakic, M.D., Ph.D.
2001	H. Robert Horvitz, Ph.D.
2000	Thomas M. Jessell, Ph.D.
1999	Marcus E. Raichle, M.D.
1998	Richard Axel, M.D.
1997	Eric M. Shooter, M.A., Sc.D., D.Sc., F.R.S., and Hans Thoenen, M.D.
1996	Solomon H. Snyder, M.D.
1995	Stephen F. Heinemann, Ph.D., Shigetada Nakanishi, M.D., Ph.D., and Jeffrey Clifton Watkins, Ph.D., F.R.S.
1994	Stanley B. Prusiner, M.D.,
1993	Sten Grillner M.D.
1992	Seymour Benzer, Ph.D., Sydney Brenner, D. Phil and Mario Capecchi, Ph.D.
1991	Timothy Bliss, Ph.D., and Eric R. Kandel, M.D.
1990	Jean-Pierre Changeux, Ph.D., Bertil Hille, Ph.D., Erwin Neher, Ph.D.
1989	Julius Axelrod, Ph.D., Arvid Carlsson, M.D., Ph.D., and Paul Greengard, Ph.D.
1988	Tomas Hokfelt, M.D., Ph.D., Walle J.H. Nauta, M.D., Ph.D., and T.P.S. Powell, M.D., F.R.S.

== Bristol-Myers Squibb Award for Distinguished Achievement in Infectious Diseases Research ==
2005	Stephen C. Harrison, Ph.D.
2004	Hiroshi Nikaido, M.D.
2003	R. John Collier, Ph.D
2002	Robert G. Webster, Ph.D.,
2001	Jean-Marie Ghuysen, Ph.D.
2000	Bernard Moss, M.D., Ph.D.
1999	Julian Davies, Ph.D., F.R.S., F.R.S.C
1998	Bernard Roizman, Sc.D.
1997	Stanley Falkow, Ph.D.
1996	Louis H. Miller, M.D.
1995	Seymour J. Klebanoff, M.D., Ph.D
1994	Harold Ginsberg, M.D
1993	Robert M. Chanock, M.D
1992	Bernard N. Fields, M.D.
1991	Barry Bloom, Ph.D.

== Bristol-Myers Squibb Award for Distinguished Achievement in Cardiovascular Research ==
2005	Mark Keating, M.D.
2004	Shaun R. Coughlin, M.D., Ph.D.
2003	Masashi Yanagisawa, M.D., Ph.D.
2002	Jonathan G. Seidman, Ph.D. and Christine E. Seidman, M.D.
2001	Michael Anthony Gimbrone, Jr., M.D
2000	Jan L. Breslow, M.D
1999	Earl Davie, Ph.D.
1998	Philip Majerus, M.D
1997	Oliver Smithies, D.Phil.
1996	Tadashi Inagami, Ph.D. and John H. Laragh, M.D
1995	Daniel Steinberg, M.D., Ph.D.
1994	Desire Collen, M.D., Ph.D., Marc Verstraete, M.D., Ph.D., and Aaron Marcus, M.D
1993	Eugene Braunwald, M.D. and William B. Kannel, M.D., M.P.H.
1992	Robert J. Lefkowitz, M.D.
1991	Robert F. Furchgott, Ph.D.

== Bristol-Myers Squibb Award for Distinguished Achievement in Metabolic Diseases Research ==
2006	Joseph Avruch M.D.
2005	Salih J. Wakil, Ph.D.
2004	C. Ronald Kahn, M.D.
2003	Bruce M. Spiegelman, Ph.D.
2002	Philip Cohen, Ph.D., F.R.S.
2001	Jeffrey M. Friedman, M.D., Ph.D.
2000	Ronald M. Evans, Ph.D.

== Bristol-Myers Squibb Award for Distinguished Achievement in Synthetic Organic Synthesis Research ==
2006	Samuel Danishefsky, Ph.D.
2005	Stephen Buchwald, Ph.D.
2004	Robert Grubbs, Ph.D.

== See also ==
- List of chemistry awards
- List of medicine awards
