= Johanna Joyce =

Oncology researcher and academic

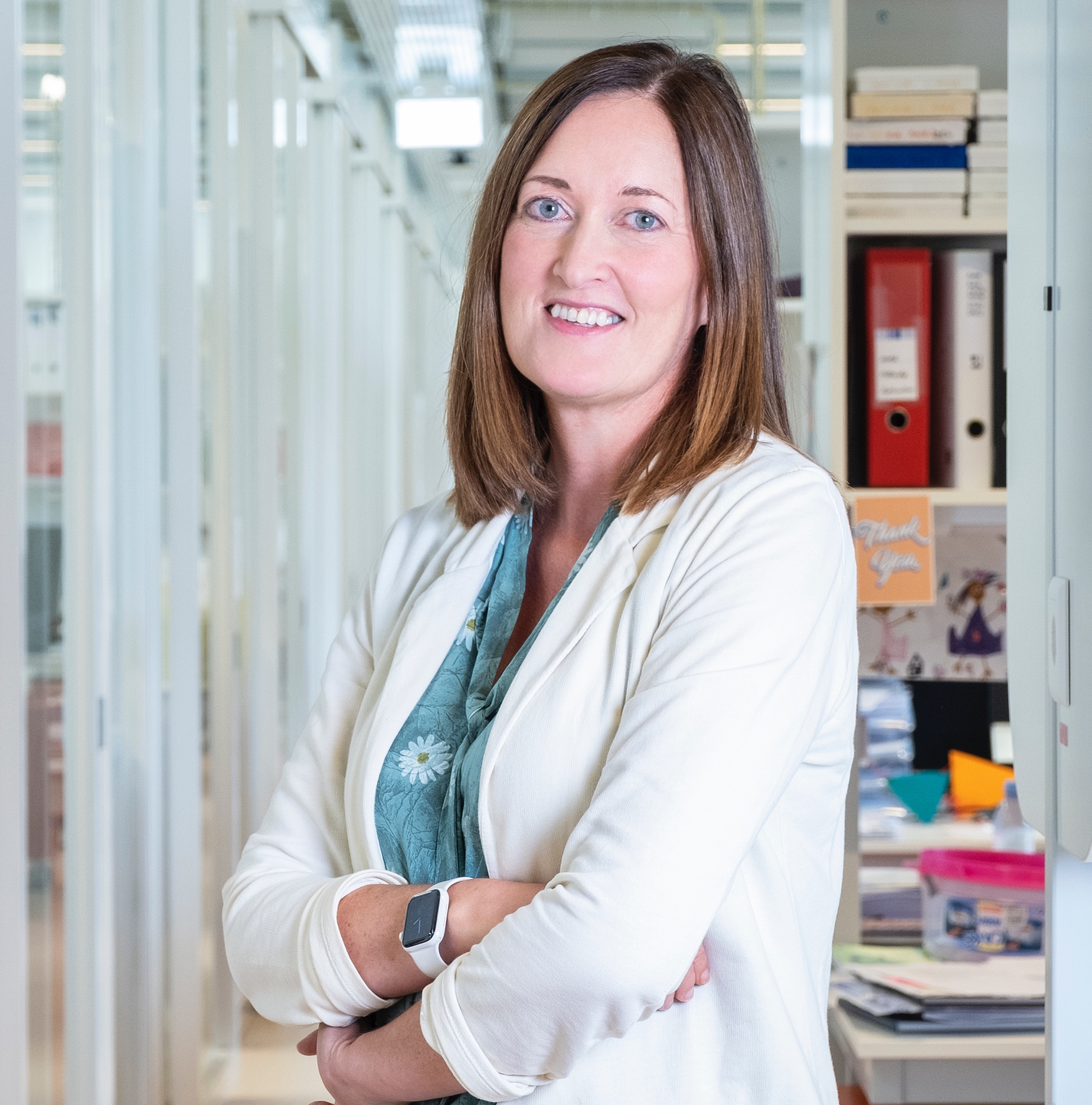
- Education: University of Cambridge; Trinity College Dublin
- Scientific career
- Workplaces: University of Lausanne; Sloan-Kettering Institute; University of California, San Francisco; University of Cambridge
- Thesis: Molecular genetic analysis of Beckwith-Wiedemann syndrome (1999)

Johanna Joyce is a cancer researcher and professor at the University of Lausanne and a full Member of the Ludwig Institute for Cancer Research. Her research explores the mechanisms by which the tumour microenvironment regulates the development of cancer. She is president of the European Association for Cancer Research, an elected fellow of the American Association for Cancer Research and an elected member of the European Molecular Biology Organisation. She has received many awards and honors including the 2020 Swiss Academy of Medical Sciences Robert Bing Prize in Neuroscience and the 2023 Pezcoller-Marina Larcher Fogazzaro-EACR Women in Cancer Research Award.

== Early life and education ==
Joyce was born in London and grew up close to Dublin. She credits her high school teachers for her inspiration to study science. She completed her undergraduate degree at Trinity College Dublin. She pursued her doctoral research at University of Cambridge, where she investigated Beckwith–Wiedemann syndrome. She subsequently went to the University of California, San Francisco for a postdoctoral fellowship with Douglas Hanahan. Joyce opened her independent research lab in 2005 at the Memorial Sloan Kettering Cancer Center as an Assistant Member.

== Research and career ==
Joyce was appointed as an assistant professor at the Weill Cornell Graduate School of Medical Sciences in 2005. At MSKCC she primarily investigated the functions of tumor-associated macrophages. She spent her time outside the lab teaching, including at City University and New York University. She was promoted to associate professor in 2010, and full professor in 2014. She moved to the University of Lausanne in 2016 where she became a professor of oncology, as well as a Member of the Ludwig Institute for Cancer Research. She later served as the inaugural executive director of the Agora Cancer Research Center in Lausanne.

Joyce's research considers the tumor microenvironment and the influence of non-cancerous immune and stromal cells. Joyce combines intravital microscopy with molecular MRI to look inside the brain. She has shown that cancer cells send regulatory signals to normal tissue cells which endows them with tumor-promoting functions, and that this can enhance tumor malignancy. She uses this insight to develop new therapies that are targeted toward the tumor microenvironment. For example, her research showed that targeting macrophages that promoted cancer (tumor-associated macrophages) with an inhibitor of the CSF-1 receptor did not deplete the macrophages, but changed their function, making them cancer fighters. She looked at how tumor-associated macrophages are impacted by radiotherapy, showing this it could drive therapy resistance and trigger glioma growth.

Joyce has studied the complex microenvironment of brain tumors, including functional studies of preclinical models. She has studied the role of extra-intestinal microbiota in brain metastasis, and how bacterial depletion impacts brain metastasis. Her research has revealed the phenotypes of many immune cells in the brain, and other organs, as well as endothelial and mural cells in tumour vasculature.

== Awards and honours ==
- 2007 Geoffrey Beene Junior Faculty Chair
- 2011 Boyer Young Investigator Award
- 2016 Women in Science Switzerland Annual Symposium
- 2017 Elected Fellow of European Academy of Cancer Sciences
- 2017 Elected Member of the European Molecular Biology Organisation
- 2018 Cloëtta Prize
- 2020 Robert Bing Prize in Neuroscience
- 2022 Mark Foundation for Cancer Research ASPIRE Award
- 2022 Metastasis Research Society Fidler Award in Innovation
- 2023 Pezcoller-Marina Larcher Fogazzaro-EACR Women in Cancer Research Award
- 2024 Elected Academy Fellow of American Association for Cancer Research
- 2024 Cell Press 50 Scientists that Inspire
- 2024 President-Elect of European Association for Cancer Research

== Selected publications ==
- Daniela F. Quail; Johanna A. Joyce (2013). "Microenvironmental regulation of tumor progression and metastasis". Nature medicine. 19 (11): 1423–37. doi:10.1038/nm.3394. PMC 3954707. PMID 24202395. Wikidata Q29615504.
- Joyce JA; Pollard JW (2009). "Microenvironmental regulation of metastasis". Nature Reviews Cancer. 9 (4): 239–52. doi:10.1038/nrc2618. PMC 3251309. PMID 19279573. Wikidata Q29547660.
- Stephanie M Pyonteck; Akkari, Leila; Schuhmacher, Alberto; et al. (2013). "CSF-1R inhibition alters macrophage polarization and blocks glioma progression". Nature medicine. 19 (10): 1264–1272. doi:10.1038/nm.3337. PMC 3840724. PMID 24056773. Wikidata Q34993852.
