= Incheol Shin =

South Korean cancer researcher

- Hangul: 신인철
- RR: Sin Incheol
- MR: Sin Inch'ŏl

Incheol Shin is a South Korean cancer researcher and, since 2005, a faculty member at the Department of Life Science, College of Natural Science, Hanyang University, Seoul, South Korea. He was formerly a post-doc and then research faculty at Vanderbilt Ingram Cancer Center in Nashville, Tennessee, U.S.A.

== Publications ==
- I Shin; FM Yakes; F Rojo; NY Shin; AV Bakin; J Baselga; CL Arteaga (16 September 2002). "PKB/Akt mediates cell-cycle progression by phosphorylation of p27^{Kip1} at threonine 157 and modulation of its cellular localization" (PDF). Nature Medicine. 8 (10). Nature Medicine: 1145–52. doi:10.1038/nm759. PMID 12244301. S2CID 19954112.
- Bong Gu Kang; June Ho Shin; Jae Kyu Yi; Ho Chul Kang; Jong Joo Lee; Hyen Seok Heo; Ji Hyung Chae; Incheol Shin; Chul Geun Kim (May 2007). "Corepressor MMTR/DMAP1 is Involved in both Histone Deacetylase 1- and TFIIH-Mediated Transcriptional Repression". Molecular and Cellular Biology. 27 (10). American Society for Microbiology: 3578–3588. doi:10.1128/MCB.01808-06. PMC 1899998. PMID 17371848.
- Incheol Shin; Jeniffer Ed; Swati Biswas; P. Charles Lin; Raymond Mernaugh; Carlos L. Arteaga (April 1, 2005). "Proapoptotic Activity of Cell-Permeable Anti-Akt Single-Chain Antibodies". Cancer Research. 65 (7). Cancer Research: 2815–2824. doi:10.1158/0008-5472.CAN-04-2898. PMID 15805282.
