= Melanie Greter =

Swiss neuroimmunologist

- Education: University of Zurich
- Known for: Distinct ontogeny of microglia and border-associated macrophages
- Awards: 2018 European Research Council Consolidator Grant - "Development and Function of Brain Scavenger Cells", 2013 Swiss National Science Foundation Starting Grant
- Scientific career
- Fields: Neuroimmunology
- Workplaces: Institute of Experimental Immunology at the University of Zurich

Melanie Greter is a Swiss neuroimmunologist and a Swiss National Science Foundation Professor in the Institute of Experimental Immunology at the University of Zurich. Greter explores the ontogeny and function of microglia and border-associated macrophages of the central nervous system to understand how they maintain homeostasis and contribute to brain-related diseases.

== Early life and education ==
After completing her undergraduate degree, Greter pursued a master's degree in biology at the University of Zurich in Switzerland. She completed her Master's thesis at the Institute of Neuropathology at the University Hospital Zurich. After her Master's, Greter decided to stay in academia and pursue a PhD.

=== Graduate work ===
In 2003, Greter entered her graduate studies in the Institute of Neuroimmunology at the University of Zurich in Switzerland. Greter joined the lab of Burkhard Becher who had just recently started his lab at the University of Zurich in the Department of Neurology. In the Burkhard Lab, Greter explored the role of cytokines in driving inflammation in different disease models. One of the first projects that Greter worked on led to a paper in Nature Medicine where the team found that ablating microglia inhibited the development and maintenance of inflammation in the central nervous system in experimental autoimmune encephalomyelitis. Shortly after, Greter published a first author publication in Nature Medicine showing that a unique population of vessel-associated dendritic cells in the brain act as antigen-presenting cells and mediate the activation and entry of reactive T cells into the brain to initiate inflammation and disease development. Towards the end of Greter's PhD, she wrote a review paper with Becher discussing the current knowledge of how autoreactive T cells enter the brain to initiate inflammation and disease progression.

=== Postdoctoral work ===
After finishing her PhD in 2007, Greter moved to the United States to conduct her postdoctoral work in the lab of Miriam Merad at Mount Sinai School of Medicine in New York City. In 2009, Greter published a first author paper from her graduate work showing that T cells can be activated during an immune insult at sites other than lymph nodes. Greter made this discovery using alymphoplastic mice which lack lymph nodes due to a specific genetic mutation. She found that, upon immune insult, B cell activation and antibody generation were strongly affected, but T cell activation was not. She then found that T cells were being activated at the liver, suggesting for the first time that lymph nodes are not necessary for T cell activation and induction of cell-mediated immunity.

In the Merad Lab, Greter first focused her research on exploring the ontogeny of dendritic cells in the intestinal lamina propria. Greter also studied other macrophage-like cells, specifically microglia such that in 2010, Greter became second author on a seminal paper in the field of neuroimmunology and glial biology. Greter and her colleagues in the Merad Lab found that microglia, the brain's resident macrophages, derive from primitive macrophages in the fetal yolk sac. Further, microglia require the CSF-1 receptor for development. Overall, their study showed, for the first time, a subpopulation of macrophage-like cells that are ontogenically distinct in the mononuclear phagocyte system which has since led to helping scientists explore their homeostatic functions and roles in disease. Near the end of her postdoctoral work, Greter published a first author paper in Immunity exploring the role of Csf-2 in controlling the homeostasis of non-lymphoid tissue-resident dendritic cells and further that Csf-2 is not necessary for the differentiation and function of inflammatory dendritic cells.

== Career and research ==
In 2011, Greter moved back to Switzerland to work at her alma mater, the University of Zurich. In 2012, she published a first author paper in Immunity highlighting the striking finding that IL-34, the alternative ligand of colony stimulating factor-1 receptor, is crucial for the repopulation of langerhans cells in the skin and for the maintenance, but not the development of, microglia in the brain.

In 2013, Greter was offered an opportunity to start her own lab at the University of Zurich. Greter now works in the Institute of Experimental Immunology at the University of Zurich where she is a tenure track professor supported by the Swiss National Science Foundation (SNSF). Greter was one of two neuroscientists at the University of Zurich to receive the SNSF Starting Grant in 2013 providing 1.5 million dollars in funding to support her goals of targeting specific cells within the mononuclear phagocyte system despite their immense heterogeneity.

Since becoming a professor, Greter has remained a source of critical knowledge in the microglia community. Her work not helps to elucidate the distinct ontogeny and functions of microglia from other myeloid cells, but she has also written articles discussing microglia versus myeloid nomenclature to keep the community united by common terms. She has also discussed the specificity and efficacy of Cre/loxP systems for use in probing biological systems so that the field can stay up to date with the status of current tools with which to probe cells in the immune and nervous systems.

Greter's first paper as a professor was published in 2016, just three years after starting her lab. The paper, published in Nature Immunology, highlighted their discovery of Sall1 as a transcriptional regulator that defines microglia identity and function and is specific to microglia and not other macrophage or mononuclear cells in the central nervous system. They further used the Sall1 locus for microglia-specific gene targeting and they found that inactivating the Sall1 locus led microglia to transition from a resting state to a pro-inflammatory phagocytic state suggesting the critical role Sall1 plays in maintaining microglial identity and physiology in vivo.

In 2020, Greter and her lab published a paper in Cell highlighting their discovery of the distinct ontogeny of microglia versus border-associated macrophages. Fascinatingly, these two cellular populations have distinct progenitors in the fetal yolk sac suggesting that they are actual distinct in very early stages of development. They further found that TGF-beta was necessary for microglial differentiation and development, but was dispensable for border-associated macrophages. This novel discovery that microglia and border-associated macrophages possess distinct developmental programs will dramatically enhance our ability to probe the biology of these cells, specifically target them in vivo, and understand their distinct roles in disease pathogenesis.

In addition to running her lab and mentoring young scientists, Greter is an Advisory Editorial Board Member for the Life Science Alliance as well as an International Advisory Board Member of the International Society of Neuroimmunology.

== Awards and honors ==
- 2018 European Research Council Consolidator Grant - "Development and Function of Brain Scavenger Cells"
- 2013 Swiss National Science Foundation Starting Grant

== Select publications ==
- Utz, Sebastian G.; See, Peter; Mildenberger, Wiebke; Thion, Morgane Sonia; Silvin, Aymeric; Lutz, Mirjam; Ingelfinger, Florian; Rayan, Nirmala Arul; Lelios, Iva; Buttgereit, Anne; Asano, Kenichi; Prabhakar, Shyam; Garel, Sonia; Becher, Burkhard; Ginhoux, Florent; Greter, Melanie (April 2020). "Early Fate Defines Microglia and Non-parenchymal Brain Macrophage Development". Cell. 181 (3): 557–573.e18. doi:10.1016/j.cell.2020.03.021. PMID 32259484.
- Stifter, Sebastian A.; Greter, Melanie (March 2020). "STOP floxing around: Specificity and leakiness of inducible Cre/loxP systems". European Journal of Immunology. 50 (3): 338–341. doi:10.1002/eji.202048546. PMID 32125704.
- Lelios, Iva; Cansever, Dilay; Utz, Sebastian G.; Mildenberger, Wiebke; Stifter, Sebastian A.; Greter, Melanie (2 March 2020). "Emerging roles of IL-34 in health and disease". Journal of Experimental Medicine. 217 (3). doi:10.1084/jem.20190290. PMC 7062519. PMID 31940023.
- Utz, Sebastian G.; Greter, Melanie (6 May 2019). "Checking macrophages at the border". Nature Neuroscience. 22 (6): 848–850. doi:10.1038/s41593-019-0411-6. PMID 31061495. S2CID 146117779.
- Yu, Xueyang; Buttgereit, Anne; Lelios, Iva; Utz, Sebastian G.; Cansever, Dilay; Becher, Burkhard; Greter, Melanie (November 2017). "The Cytokine TGF-β Promotes the Development and Homeostasis of Alveolar Macrophages". Immunity. 47 (5): 903–912.e4. doi:10.1016/j.immuni.2017.10.007. PMID 29126797.
- Buttgereit, Anne; Lelios, Iva; Yu, Xueyang; Vrohlings, Melissa; Krakoski, Natalie R; Gautier, Emmanuel L; Nishinakamura, Ryuichi; Becher, Burkhard; Greter, Melanie (24 October 2016). "Sall1 is a transcriptional regulator defining microglia identity and function" (PDF). Nature Immunology. 17 (12): 1397–1406. doi:10.1038/ni.3585. PMID 27776109. S2CID 2095471.
- Croxford, Andrew L.; Lanzinger, Margit; Hartmann, Felix J.; Schreiner, Bettina; Mair, Florian; Pelczar, Pawel; Clausen, Björn E.; Jung, Steffen; Greter, Melanie; Becher, Burkhard (September 2015). "The Cytokine GM-CSF Drives the Inflammatory Signature of CCR2+ Monocytes and Licenses Autoimmunity". Immunity. 43 (3): 502–514. doi:10.1016/j.immuni.2015.08.010. PMID 26341401.
- Greter, Melanie; Lelios, Iva; Croxford, Andrew Lewis (26 May 2015). "Microglia Versus Myeloid Cell Nomenclature during Brain Inflammation". Frontiers in Immunology. 6: 249. doi:10.3389/fimmu.2015.00249. PMC 4443742. PMID 26074918.
- Greter, Melanie; Lelios, Iva; Pelczar, Pawel; Hoeffel, Guillaume; Price, Jeremy; Leboeuf, Marylene; Kündig, Thomas M.; Frei, Karl; Ginhoux, Florent; Merad, Miriam; Becher, Burkhard (December 2012). "Stroma-Derived Interleukin-34 Controls the Development and Maintenance of Langerhans Cells and the Maintenance of Microglia". Immunity. 37 (6): 1050–1060. doi:10.1016/j.immuni.2012.11.001. PMC 4291117. PMID 23177320.
- Greter, Melanie; Merad, Miriam (January 2013). "Regulation of microglia development and homeostasis" (PDF). Glia. 61 (1): 121–127. doi:10.1002/glia.22408. PMID 22927325. S2CID 42067989.
- Greter, Melanie; Helft, Julie; Chow, Andrew; Hashimoto, Daigo; Mortha, Arthur; Agudo-Cantero, Judith; Bogunovic, Milena; Gautier, Emmanuel L.; Miller, Jennifer; Leboeuf, Marylene; Lu, Geming; Aloman, Costica; Brown, Brian D.; Pollard, Jeffrey W.; Xiong, Huabao; Randolph, Gwendalyn J.; Chipuk, Jerry E.; Frenette, Paul S.; Merad, Miriam (June 2012). "GM-CSF Controls Nonlymphoid Tissue Dendritic Cell Homeostasis but Is Dispensable for the Differentiation of Inflammatory Dendritic Cells". Immunity. 36 (6): 1031–1046. doi:10.1016/j.immuni.2012.03.027. PMC 3498051. PMID 22749353.
- Ginhoux, F.; Greter, M.; Leboeuf, M.; Nandi, S.; See, P.; Gokhan, S.; Mehler, M. F.; Conway, S. J.; Ng, L. G.; Stanley, E. R.; Samokhvalov, I. M.; Merad, M. (21 October 2010). "Fate Mapping Analysis Reveals That Adult Microglia Derive from Primitive Macrophages". Science. 330 (6005): 841–845. Bibcode:2010Sci...330..841G. doi:10.1126/science.1194637. PMC 3719181. PMID 20966214.
- Greter, Melanie; Hofmann, Janin; Becher, Burkhard (26 May 2009). "Neo-Lymphoid Aggregates in the Adult Liver Can Initiate Potent Cell-Mediated Immunity". PLOS Biology. 7 (5) e1000109. doi:10.1371/journal.pbio.1000109. PMC 2680335. PMID 19468301.
- Greter, Melanie; Heppner, Frank L; Lemos, Maria P; Odermatt, Bernhard M; Goebels, Norbert; Laufer, Terri; Noelle, Randolph J; Becher, Burkhard (27 February 2005). "Dendritic cells permit immune invasion of the CNS in an animal model of multiple sclerosis". Nature Medicine. 11 (3): 328–334. doi:10.1038/nm1197. PMID 15735653. S2CID 35751648.
