= Prince Philipp of Liechtenstein =

Member of the princely family of Liechtenstein

Prince Philipp
- Count of Rietberg
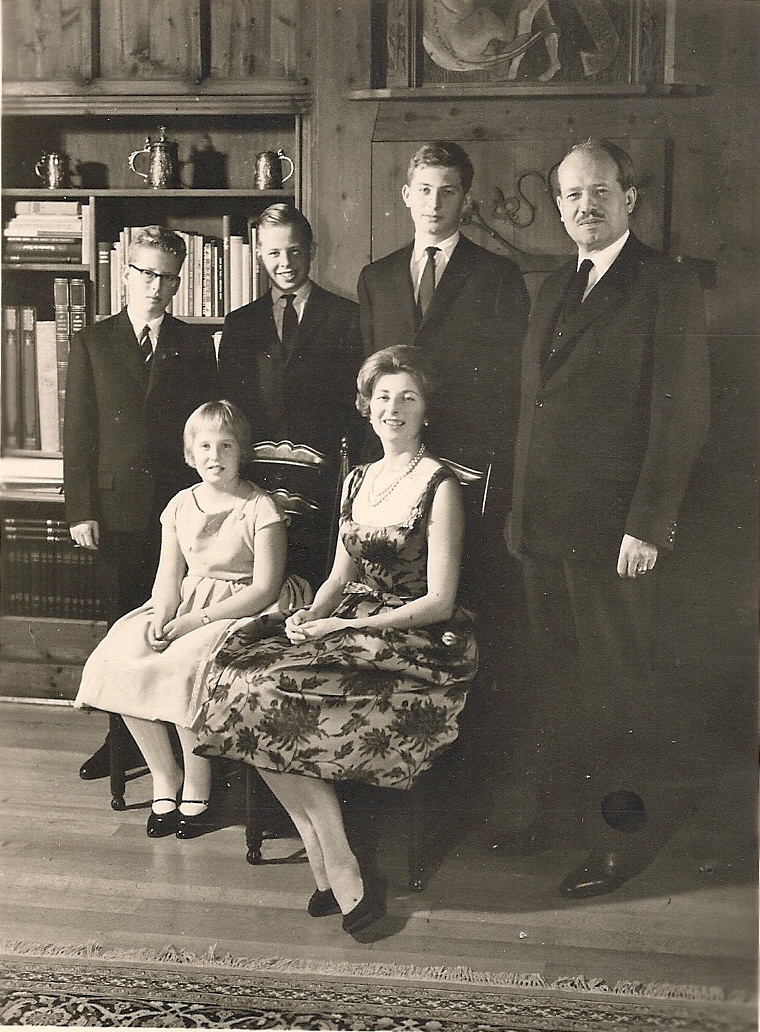
- Prince Philipp with his family in 1955
- Born: 19 August 1946 (age 79); Zürich, Switzerland
- Spouse: Isabelle Fernande Ghislaine Guillemette Elisabeth de l'Arbre de Malander (m. 1971)
- Issue: Prince Alexander; Prince Wenzeslaus; Prince Rudolf Ferdinand
Names
- Philipp Erasmus Alois Ferdinand Maria Sebaldus
- House: Liechtenstein
- Father: Franz Joseph II, Prince of Liechtenstein
- Mother: Countess Georgina von Wilczek

Prince Philipp of Liechtenstein (Philipp Erasmus Alois Ferdinand Maria Sebaldus; born 19 August 1946) is a member of the princely family of Liechtenstein. He is a son of the late Franz Joseph II and the younger brother of current reigning prince Hans-Adam II.

== Biography ==
Prince Philipp was born in Zürich as the second son of Franz Joseph II, Prince of Liechtenstein and his wife, Countess Georgina of Wilczek.

Prince Philipp studied history and sociology at the University of Bonn and the University of Basel. He has been a member of the board of directors of the LGT group since 1981, and the chairman of that organisation since 2001.

== Marriage and family ==
He married Isabelle Fernande Ghislaine Guillemette Elisabeth de l'Arbre de Malander (b. 24 November 1949 in Ronse, Belgium) on 11 September 1971, daughter of Jean-Baptiste André de l'Arbre de Malander and wife Guillemette Marie Grassal.

They have three sons and four grandchildren:

- Prince Alexander Wilhelm Hans Adam of Liechtenstein (born on 19 May 1972 in Basel, Canton of Basel-Stadt, Switzerland). Married civilly in Vaduz on 24 January 2003 and religiously in Salzburg on 8 February 2003 to Astrid Barbara Kohl (born on 13 September 1968 in Regensburg, Germany), daughter of Theodor Kohl and wife Ingrid Schlechta. They have a daughter:
  - Princess Theodora Alexandra Isabella Antonia Nora Marie of Liechtenstein (born on 20 November 2004 in Chêne-Bougeries, Canton of Geneva, Switzerland). Raised in Italy, she read architecture at St John's College, University of Cambridge. She founded in 2014, at only 10, the Green Teen Team Foundation, an environmental foundation. Princess Theodora is an ambassador for Project 0, a charity focuses on protecting the ocean from plastic pollution. She won the first place of both individual and team test at the 2022 Junior Grand Prix Dressage competition. She also visited Romania and Seychelles on behalf of her foundation.
- Prince Wenzeslaus of Liechtenstein (born on 12 May 1974 in Uccle, Brussels, Belgium). From 2003 to 2006, he dated Brazilian model Adriana Lima.
- Prince Rudolf Ferdinand of Liechtenstein (born on 7 September 1975 in Uccle, Brussels, Belgium). Married in Istanbul on 20 April 2012 to İlhan Tılsım Tanberk, a Turkish businesswoman and heiress of the Sinter Metal company. She was born on 20 July 1974 in Istanbul, Turkey as a daughter of Olgun Tanberk, founder of the family-owned engineering group Sinter Metal, and wife Melek Kampulat. They have three children:
  - Princess Alienor Faye of Liechtenstein (Turkish: Alya Nur, 29 September 2014 – 13 December 2015).
  - Princess Laetitia of Liechtenstein (born on 21 July 2016 in Zürich, Switzerland). Twin of Prince Karl Ludwig.
  - Prince Karl Ludwig of Liechtenstein (born on 21 July 2016 in Zürich, Switzerland). Twin of Princess Laetitia.

== Honours ==
=== National honours ===
- Liechtenstein: Grand Star of the Order of Merit of the Principality of Liechtenstein, 1st Class
- Liechtenstein: Recipient of the 70th Birthday Medal of Prince Franz Joseph II

Prince Philipp of Liechtenstein House of Liechtenstein Born: 19 August 1946
Lines of succession
| Preceded by Prince Benedikt | Line of succession to the Liechtensteiner throne 9th position | Succeeded by Prince Alexander |
