= Greter =

Greter is a surname. Notable people with the surname include:

- Johan Greter (1900–1975), Dutch equestrian
- Melanie Greter, Swiss neuroimmunologist
- Otto Greter (born 1910), Swiss fencer
