= João Monteiro =

João Monteiro may refer to:

- João Monteiro (editor), Brazilian editor of Nature Medicine
- João Monteiro (table tennis) (born 1983), Portuguese table tennis player
- João Monteiro (footballer) (born 2001), Portuguese footballer
