= Cloetta (disambiguation) =

Cloetta or Cloëtta may refer to:

- Cloetta, Swedish company
- Cloëtta Prize, Swiss biomedical distinction
- Cloetta Center, former name of the Saab Arena
