= Burkhard (given name) =

Burkhard is a masculine German language given name. Notable people with the name include:

== I ==
- Burkhard (bishop of Passau) (died 915), 14th Bishop of Passau
- Burkhard I, Lord of Zollern (died in 1061)
- Burkhard VII. Münch (died 1444), knight and life peer
- Burkhard, Margrave of Austria, first margrave in the Bavarian marchia orientalis

== B ==
- Burkhard Balz (born 1969), German politician
- Burkhard Becher, German immunologist, biomedical researcher, and academic
- Burkhard Beins (born 1964), German composer/performer
- Burkhard Bilger (born 1964), American journalist and author
- Burkhard Blienert (born 1966), German politician

== C ==
- Burkhard Christoph von Münnich, (1683–1767), German-born army officer
- Burkhard Cordes (born 1939), Brazilian sailor

== D ==
- Burkhard Dallwitz (born 1959), German Australian composer
- Burkhard Dick (born 1963), German ophthalmologist
- Burkhard Driest (1939–2020), German actor, writer, and director

== E ==
- Burkhard Ebert (1942–2025), German cyclist

== G ==
- Burkhard Gantenbein (1912–2007), Swiss handball player
- Burkhard Gladigow (1939–2022), German scholar of religious studies and classical philology
- Burkhard Glaetzner (born 1943), German oboe virtuoso and conductor
- Burkhard Gotthelf Struve (1671–1738), German librarian

== H ==
- Burkhard Heim (1925–2001), German theoretical physicist
- Burkhard Held, German painter
- Burkhard Hirsch (1930–2020), German politician

== J ==
- Burkhard Jung (born 1958), German politician

== L ==
- Burkhard Leuschke (born 1940), East German race walker
- Burkhard Lischka (born 1965), German lawyer and politician

== M ==
- Burkhard Malich (born 1936), German chess Grandmaster
- Burkhard Meier (1943–2001), German music educator and composer

== P ==
- Burkhard Pape (1932–2024), German football player and manager
- Burkhard Wilhelm Pfeiffer (1777–1852), German jurist and liberal politician

== R ==
- Burkhard Reich (born 1964), German footballer
- Burkhard Rost (born 1961), German scientist

== S ==
- Burkhard Segler (born 1951), German footballer
- Burkhard Scherer (born 1971), professor of Buddhist studies
- Burkhard Schittny, German visual artist
- Burkhard Schröder, German journalist
- Burkhard Schwenker (born 1958), German business consultant
- Burkhard Spinnen (born 1956), German author
- Burkhard Stangl (born 1960), composer and musician

== T ==
- Burkhard Tesdorpf (born 1962), German equestrian

== V ==
- Burkhard von Berlichingen (c.1550–1623), imperial councillor
- Burkhard von Hornhausen (died 1260), Landmeister in Livonia
- Burkhard von Weisbriach (1420/23–1466), German Catholic cardinal

== Z ==
- Burkhard Ziese (1944–2010), German football manager

== See also ==
- Burkhard (surname)
- Burchard (name)
