= Olaf Blanke =

Swiss and German physician, neurologist and neuroscientist

Professor Olaf Blanke
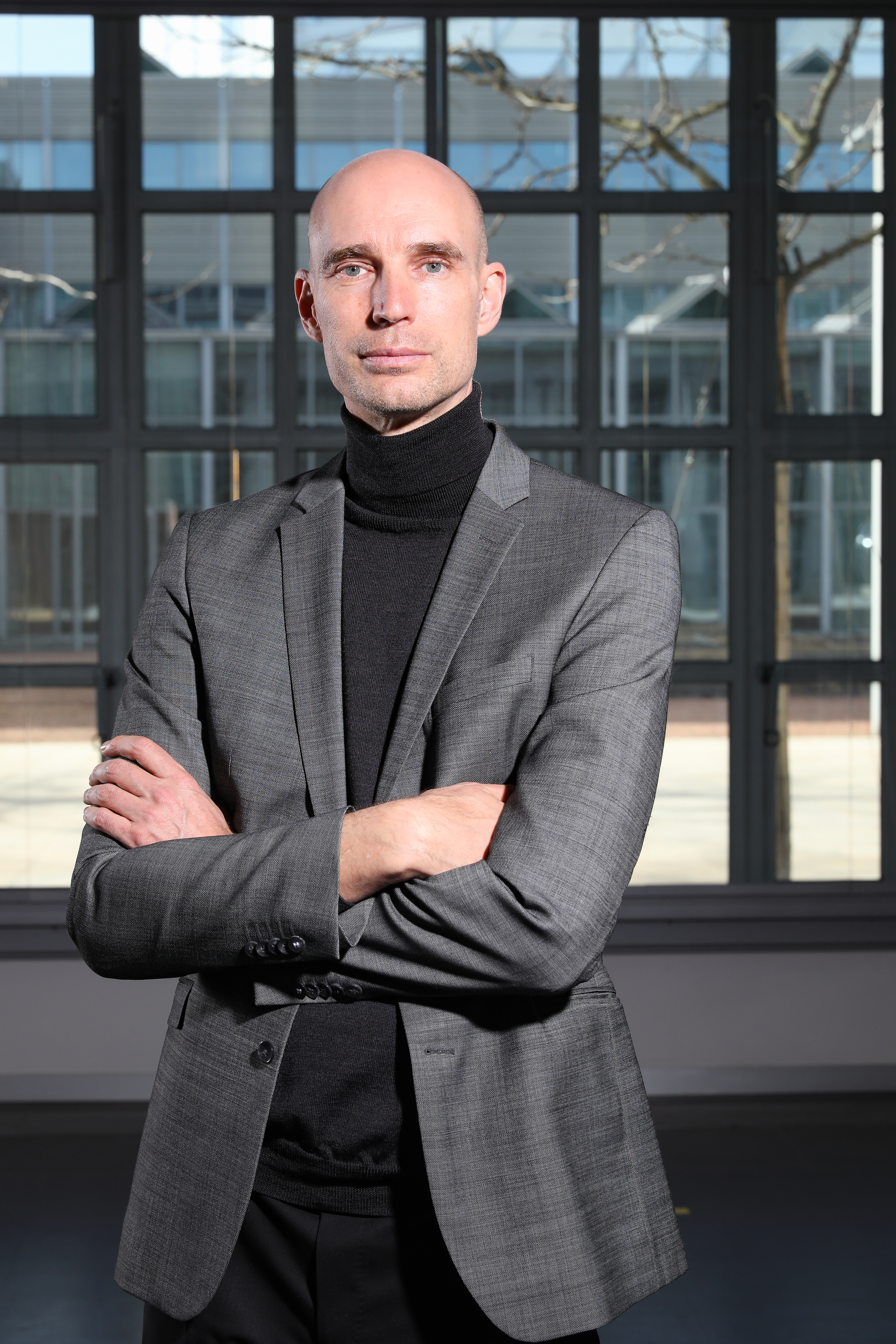
- Olaf Blanke in 2021
- Born: 1969 (age 56–57)
- Occupations: Neuroscientist and Neurologist
- Known for: Consciousness studies
- Title: Prof. Dr.
- Awards: Cloëtta Prize (2012); Robert Bing Prize (2006); Pfizer Prize (2005)

Academic background
- Education: Medicine; Neurology; Neuroscience
- Alma mater: Free University of Berlin; Sorbonne University
- Doctoral advisor: Otto-Joachim Grüsser
- Other advisors: Margitta Seeck; Nicolas de Tribolet; Theodor Landis

Academic work
- Institutions: EPFL (École Polytechnique Fédérale de Lausanne); Geneva University Hospitals
- Website: https://www.epfl.ch/labs/lnco/

Olaf Blanke (born 1969) is a Swiss and German physician, neurologist, and neuroscientist. He holds the Bertarelli Foundation Chair in Cognitive Neuroprosthetics at the École Polytechnique Fédérale de Lausanne (EPFL). He directs the Laboratory of Cognitive Neuroscience at the Brain Mind Institute of EPFL and is professor of Neurology at Geneva University Hospitals. Blanke is known for his research on the neurological bases of self-consciousness and out-of-body experiences.

== Career ==
From 1989 to 1996 Blanke studied in medicine at ((University of Münster)),Free University of Berlin and at Sorbonne University, Paris. He carried out his doctoral work in neuroscience with Otto-Joachim Grüsser at the Institute of Neurophysiology at the Free University of Berlin on multisensory mechanisms of saccadic eye movements. He then joined the presurgical epilepsy program at Geneva University Hospitals as a postdoctoral researcher to work with Margitta Seeck and Nicolas de Tribolet on epileptology, cognitive neuroscience and brain imaging. In 1999, he joined Theodor Landis as a resident doctor at the neurology department by at Geneva University Hospitals.

He joined the EPFL in 2004 first as an assistant professor and has been full professor in neuroscience at EPFL since 2012. Since 2004, he has been the director of the Laboratory of Cognitive Neuroscience at the Brain Mind Institute specialized in robotics and virtual reality.

In 2013, Blanke was appointed as a full professor in the Department of Clinical Neurosciences at the University of Geneva.

Since 2018, Blanke has acted as founding director of EPFL's Center for Neuroprosthetics, dedicated to research in engineering, neuroscience and medicine, with research activities in Geneva, Fribourg, Sion, and Lausanne.

Blanke is a board member of the neuro technology company Mindmaze and co-founded Metaphysiks.

== Research ==
Blanke's research is dedicated to the neuroscientific study of multisensory body perception and self-consciousness. Together with Thomas Metzinger he defined the concept of bodily self-consciousness and showed that bodily self-consciousness is based on the integration of specific bodily signals, including interoceptive and exteroceptive signals.

For his research he adopted different virtual reality (VR), augmented reality (AR), and mixed reality (MR) technologies with human neuroscience methods to investigate and induce controlled altered states of bodily self-consciousness. The group further integrated VR and robotics with magnetic resonance imaging (MRI) to identify the cortical network underlying bodily self-consciousness. The description of this cortical network was extended and supported by electrophysiological and neuroimaging data in different patient populations with altered states of bodily self-consciousness such as out-of-body experiences, the sense of presence or presence hallucinations, or Doppelgänger experiences.

Blanke's medical activities focus on the field of cognitive neuroprosthetics, and are dedicated to the design and clinical application of VR and robotics technology as novel diagnostic and therapeutic procedures. He developed and tested several new VR-based procedures for patients with chronic pain such as complex regional pain syndrome, phantom limb pain in amputation, and spinal cord injury. Recently, he has developed new diagnostic and therapeutic procedures in patients with neurodegeneration such as Parkinson's disease and dementia with Lewy bodies.

He has also an interest in complex conscious experiences and their varied personal, neuroscientific, historical and cultural aspects. He has studied out-of-body experiences and astral travel, doppelgänger experiences, the sense of presence, as well as free will, and thought insertion.

== Awards ==
- Cloëtta Prize by the Prof. Dr. Max Cloëtta Foundation (2012)
- Robert Bing Prize (2006)
- Pfizer Prize (2005)
- Leenaards Prize in (2003)

== Selected publications ==
- Blanke, Olaf; Ortigue, Stphanie; Landis, Theodor; Seeck, Margitta (2002). "Stimulating illusory own-body perceptions". Nature. 419 (6904): 269–270. doi:10.1038/419269a. PMID 12239558. S2CID 4427138.
- Arzy, Shahar; Seeck, Margitta; Ortigue, Stephanie; Spinelli, Laurent; Blanke, Olaf (2006). "Induction of an illusory shadow person". Nature. 443 (7109): 287. Bibcode:2006Natur.443..287A. doi:10.1038/443287a. PMID 16988702. S2CID 4338465.
- Lenggenhager, B.; Tadi, T.; Metzinger, T.; Blanke, O. (2007). "Video Ergo Sum: Manipulating Bodily Self-Consciousness" (PDF). Science. 317 (5841): 1096–1099. Bibcode:2007Sci...317.1096L. doi:10.1126/science.1143439. PMID 17717189. S2CID 22240455.
- Blanke, Olaf; Metzinger, Thomas (2009). "Full-body illusions and minimal phenomenal selfhood". Trends in Cognitive Sciences. 13 (1): 7–13. doi:10.1016/j.tics.2008.10.003. PMID 19058991. S2CID 10158045.
- Ionta, Silvio; Heydrich, Lukas; Lenggenhager, Bigna; Mouthon, Michael; Fornari, Eleonora; Chapuis, Dominique; Gassert, Roger; Blanke, Olaf (2011). "Multisensory Mechanisms in Temporo-Parietal Cortex Support Self-Location and First-Person Perspective" (PDF). Neuron. 70 (2): 363–374. doi:10.1016/j.neuron.2011.03.009. PMID 21521620. S2CID 6391605.
- Blanke, Olaf; Pozeg, Polona; Hara, Masayuki; Heydrich, Lukas; Serino, Andrea; Yamamoto, Akio; Higuchi, Toshiro; Salomon, Roy; Seeck, Margitta; Landis, Theodor; Arzy, Shahar; Herbelin, Bruno; Bleuler, Hannes; Rognini, Giulio (2014). "Neurological and Robot-Controlled Induction of an Apparition". Current Biology. 24 (22): 2681–2686. Bibcode:2014CBio...24.2681B. doi:10.1016/j.cub.2014.09.049. PMID 25447995. S2CID 1976971.
- Blanke, Olaf; Slater, Mel; Serino, Andrea (2015). "Behavioral, Neural, and Computational Principles of Bodily Self-Consciousness". Neuron. 88 (1): 145–166. doi:10.1016/j.neuron.2015.09.029. PMID 26447578. S2CID 16001574.
- Park, Hyeong-Dong; Barnoud, Coline; Trang, Henri; Kannape, Oliver A.; Schaller, Karl; Blanke, Olaf (2020). "Breathing is coupled with voluntary action and the cortical readiness potential". Nature Communications. 11 (1): 289. Bibcode:2020NatCo..11..289P. doi:10.1038/s41467-019-13967-9. PMC 7005287. PMID 32029711.
- Pereira, Michael; Megevand, Pierre; Tan, Mi Xue; Chang, Wenwen; Wang, Shuo; Rezai, Ali; Seeck, Margitta; Corniola, Marco; Momjian, Shahan; Bernasconi, Fosco; Blanke, Olaf; Faivre, Nathan (2020). "Evidence accumulation determines conscious access". bioRxiv 10.1101/2020.07.10.196659.
- Bernasconi, Fosco; Blondiaux, Eva; Potheegadoo, Jevita; Stripeikyte, Giedre; Pagonabarraga, Javier; Bejr-Kasem, Helena; Bassolino, Michela; Akselrod, Michel; Martinez-Horta, Saul; Sampedro, Fred; Hara, Masayuki; Horvath, Judit; Franza, Matteo; Konik, Stéphanie; Bereau, Matthieu; Ghika, Joseph-André; Burkhard, Pierre R.; Van De Ville, Dimitri; Faivre, Nathan; Rognini, Giulio; Krack, Paul; Kulisevsky, Jaime; Blanke, Olaf (2020). "Sensorimotor hallucinations in Parkinson's disease". bioRxiv 10.1101/2020.05.11.054619.
