= Princess Astrid of Liechtenstein =

Liechtensteiner royal

Princess Astrid
- Born: Astrid Barbara Kohl; September 13, 1968 (age 57); Regensburg, Bavaria, Germany
- Spouse: Prince Alexander of Liechtenstein (m. 2003)
- Issue: Princess Theodora of Liechtenstein
Names
- Astrid Barbara
- House: Liechtenstein (by marriage)
- Father: Theodor Kohl
- Mother: Ingrid Schlechta
- Occupation: businesswoman interior designer art collector

Styles of Princess Astrid of Liechtenstein
- Reference style: Her Serene Highness
- Spoken style: Your Serene Highness

Princess Astrid of Liechtenstein (née Astrid Barbara Kohl; born 13 September 1968) is a German businesswoman, art collector, and interior designer. She married Prince Alexander of Liechtenstein, the nephew of Hans-Adam II, in 2003 and became a member of the Princely family of Liechtenstein.

== Biography ==
Astrid Barbara Kohl was born on 13 September 1968 in Regensburg to Theodor Kohl, a German businessman, and Ingrid Schlechta, a German art collector. Her father is an entrepreneur who founded and owned Theodor Kohl KG (gathering Kohlpharma and Th.Kohl companies), a leading German manufacturer of pharmaceutical design and distributor of pharmacy equipment.

She studied economics at the Sorbonne. Upon graduating, she worked at a financial fund in New York City. She moved back to Europe to run her father's company.

In 1993, she met Prince Alexander of Liechtenstein, the son of Prince Philipp of Liechtenstein and grandson of Franz Joseph II, in Gstaad. On 24 January 2003, she and Prince Alexander married in a civil ceremony in Vaduz. Their Catholic wedding, officiated by Archbishop Wolfgang Haas, took place on 8 February 2003 in Salzburg. Astrid wore a wedding dress by Jean Paul Gaultier for the occasion, and 300 guests were present for the three-day celebrations.

She gave birth to a daughter, Theodora Alexandra Isabella Antonia Nora Marie on 20 November 2004.

Astrid and her husband own the Villa Sant'Andrea, an 1,000-year old former Benedictine monastery overlooking Lake Garda near Verona. Their estate includes seventy-five acres of parkland, stables, a swimming pool, a church, a vineyard, and an olive grove, and an orchard. Her parents, who purchased the estate for Astrid, lived with them at the villa for twelve years. Astrid is an art collector and keeps a collection of Meissen porcelain and her home.

She and her husband own Pharmathek, a pharmaceutical company. Astrid is an interior designer and the founder of Crown Designs, which sells luxury interiors for boutiques and hotels. Her design company operates in Argentina, Brazil, Canada, China, Italy, Mexico, Russia, Saudi Arabia, the United Arab Emirates, and the United States.
