= Stephen Heinemann =

Professor of neuroscience

Stephen F. Heinemann
- Born: February 11, 1939; Boston, Massachusetts, US
- Died: August 6, 2014 (aged 75)
- Education: Caltech; Harvard University
- Spouse: Ann Reischauer
- Children: 5
- Scientific career
- Fields: neuroscience
- Workplaces: Salk Institute; MIT; Stanford University

Stephen F. Heinemann (1939–2014) was a professor of neuroscience at the Salk Institute. He was an early researcher in the field of molecular neuroscience, contributing to the current knowledge of how nerves communicate with each other, and the role of neurotransmitters. Stephen Heinemann died August 6, 2014, of kidney failure.

== Early life ==
Stephen Heinemann was born February 11, 1939, in Boston, Massachusetts, to Robert Heinemann and Christel Fuchs. He grew up in Cambridge, Massachusetts and attended Buckingham Browne & Nichols secondary school. Heinemann met his wife, Ann Reischauer Heinemann, in Cambridge. They were married for 54 years and had five children. His uncle, Emil Julius Klaus Fuchs, a physicist and spy who contributed to the development of the atomic bomb, influenced Heinemann's interest in science.

== Education and career ==
Heinemann graduated from Caltech with a bachelor's degree in 1962, and in 1967, he earned a PhD in biochemistry at Harvard University under the mentorship of Matt Meselson, a well known geneticist and molecular biologist. He then did research as a postdoctoral fellow at Massachusetts Institute of Technology and Stanford University. His work at MIT was alongside A. Dale Kaiser. They focused on how transcription is related to the phage lambda repressor synthesis. During his time at Stanford, he worked with Ethan Royal Signer. He joined the Salk Institute in 1970, where he founded the department of molecular neurobiology, which soon became known as one of the world's top research centers in the field. He did pioneering work in the subject of motor neurons and the neuromuscular junction. He remained at Salk until his retirement.

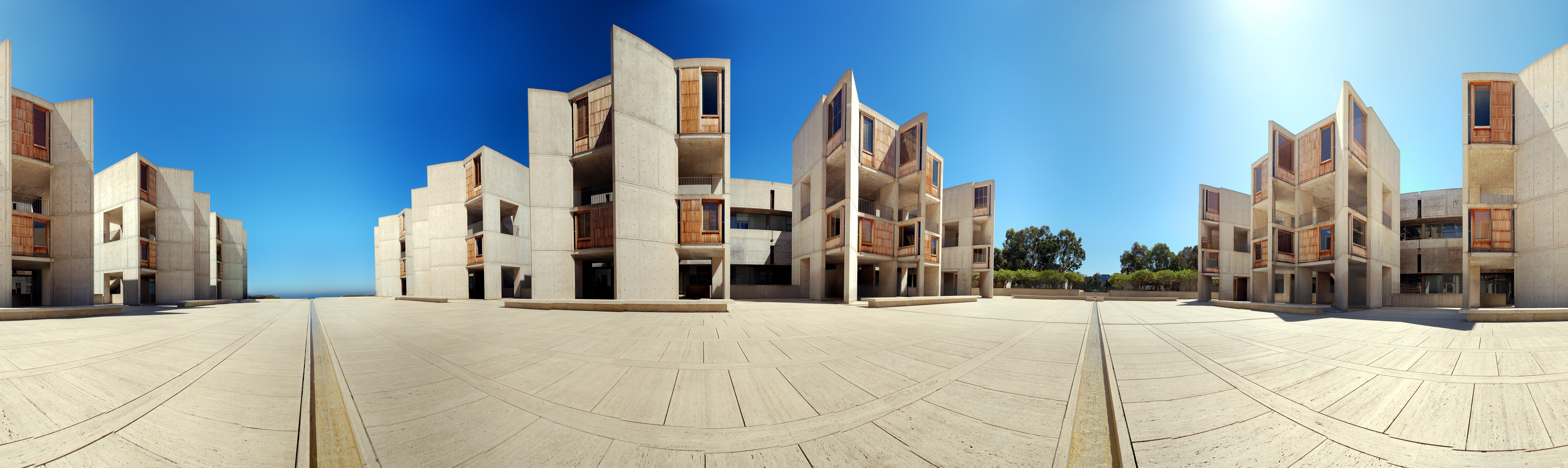
360 degree panorama in the courtyard of the Salk Institute for Biological Studies, La Jolla, California. Heinemann researched at the Salk Institute from 1970 until his retirement. Photographed on an August morning by Gregg M. Erickson.

== Research ==
Stephen F. Heinemann's research focus was acetylcholine and glutamate receptors. A majority of the excitatory neurons in the central nervous system communicate via these two chemical signaling molecules known as neurotransmitters. Heinemann's work included identifying the key structural elements of the receptor proteins that allow them to recognize signal molecules and enact change in the cell. The understanding of their structures has furthered research in cognition and neurological disorders. His research has illuminated the cognitive function of several receptors. Heinemann has also researched the application of dysfunction in these neurotransmitter receptors on human diseases including addiction and Alzheimers.

=== Glutamate receptors ===
Glutamate is an excitatory neurotransmitter. In humans and other vertebrate's brains, glutamate controls over 90% of excitatory connections. Receptors for glutamate are found throughout the brain. One contribution Heinemann made to neuroscience includes discovering and cloning the first DNA sequences of glutamate receptors. There are 3 ionotropic glutamate receptors that Heinemann contributed to differentiating: AMPA receptors, NMDA receptors, and kainate receptors. As shown by Heinemann, NMDA receptors differ in that they allow significant amounts of calcium to enter the cell rather than just sodium. Heinemann's research also illuminated the role of the metabotropic glutamate receptor 5 in learning and unlearning information using a rodent model. Metabotropic receptors differ from ionotropic receptors in that they activate other internal cell signaling pathways. Heinemann and his team also discovered the differences between kainate and AMPA receptors, which were previously thought to make up one family of glutamate receptors. Heinemann's most notable contribution to the study of glutamate as a major excitatory neurotransmitter was to identify and replicate the DNA sequences for each of many of these receptors and their subunits. This allowed for further research of the function and dysfunction of communication between neurons through neurotransmitter receptors.

=== Neurological disorders ===
Stephen Heinemann's research contributed largely to the understanding and treatment of neurological disorders. Much of his research focused on the idea that disorders can occur when connectivity is disrupted between cells. His work with glutamate receptors showed that malfunctions can contribute to disorders such as schizophrenia and bipolar disorder. In addition, he studied acetylcholine and nicotine receptors in the brain, especially their involvement with Alzheimer's and Parkinson's. In doing so, his team discovered the cause of paralysis in the neuromuscular disorder, myasthenia gravis.

== Awards ==
Heinemann received a number of rewards and honors for his achievements in science. He was an elected member of the National Academy of Sciences, the Institute of Medicine, and the American Academy of Arts and Sciences. He also served as president of the Society for Neuroscience in 2005–2006. For his outstanding efforts in research and his dedication to neuroscience, Heinemann was awarded the Bristol-Myers Squibb Distinguished Achievement in Neuroscience Research Award, the McKnight Award for Research. Additionally, he was awarded the Julius Axelrod Prize from the Society for Neuroscience in 2010 because of his research involving neuropharmacology, as well as his commitment to mentoring future scientists.

== Notable publications ==
Bevan S, Kullberg RW, Heinemann SF. Human myasthenic sera reduce acetylcholine sensitivity of human muscle cells in tissue culture. Nature. 267: 263–5. PMID 865619
Hume RI, Dingledine R, Heinemann SF. Identification of a site in glutamate receptor subunits that controls calcium permeability. Science. 253: 1028–31. PMID 1653450
Hollmann M, Heinemann S. Cloned glutamate receptors. Annual Review of Neuroscience. 17: 31–108. PMID 8210177 DOI: 10.1146/annurev.ne.17.030194.000335
Contractor A, Swanson G, Heinemann SF. Kainate receptors are involved in short- and long-term plasticity at mossy fiber synapses in the hippocampus. Neuron. 29: 209–16. PMID 11182092 DOI: 10.1016/S0896-6273(01)00191-X
Kayadjanian N, Lee HS, Piña-Crespo J, Heinemann SF. Localization of glutamate receptors to distal dendrites depends on subunit composition and the kinesin motor protein KIF17. Molecular and Cellular Neurosciences. 34: 219–30. PMID 17174564 DOI: 10.1016/j.mcn.2006.11.001
Talantova M, Sanz-Blasco S, Zhang X, Xia P, Akhtar MW, Okamoto SI, Dziewczapolski G, Nakamura T, Cao G, Pratt AE, Kang YJ, Tu S, Molokanova E, McKercher SR, Hires SA, ... ... Heinemann SF, et al. Correction to supporting information for "Aβ induces astrocytic glutamate release, extrasynaptic NMDA receptor activation, and synaptic loss," Proceedings of the National Academy of Sciences of the United States of America. 112: E3751-E3752. DOI: 10.1073/pnas.1511282112
