= Julian Davies (microbiologist) =

British microbiologist (1932–2025)

Julian Edmund Davies (January 1932 – February 2025) was a British-born microbiologist and Professor Emeritus in the Department of Microbiology and Immunology at the University of British Columbia.

== Education and personal life ==
Davies was born in Wales in January 1932. He earned a B.Sc. in 1953 (Chemistry) and a Ph.D. in 1956 (Organic Chemistry), both from the University of Nottingham. He then did post-doctoral work, first at Columbia University in New York, working on natural products chemistry under Gilbert Stork, and then at the University of Wisconsin under Eugene van Tamelen.

== Death ==
Davies died on 2 February 2025, near Vancouver, B.C.

== Career ==
=== Positions held ===
Davies began his independent professional life in 1959 as a lecturer in the Department of Chemistry at the Manchester College of Science and Technology. This was followed by research associate positions at Harvard Medical School from 1962 to 1965 (with Bernard Davis) and at the Institute Pasteur from 1965 to 1967 (with François Jacob). He then moved to the Biochemistry Department at the University of Wisconsin, first as an associate professor and then as a professor. In 1980 he left academia to become research director of the new biotechnology company Biogen in Geneva, where he became president in 1983. In 1985 he returned to the Institute Pasteur as Chief of Genetic Microbiology. In 1992 he moved to the University of British Columbia as Professor and Head of the Department of Microbiology and Immunology. Although he officially retired in 1997, he served as director of the UBC Life Sciences Centre from 2006 to 2011 and maintained an active research program until 2020.

=== Research achievements ===
Although Davies' initial work at Manchester was on the chemistry of natural products, most of his later research focused on how bacteria interact with antibiotics and other small molecules, with important advances in understanding how aminoglycoside antibiotics work and how bacteria become resistant to them. His subsequent work at Harvard introduced him to bacterial genetics and molecular biology (he credits Walter Gilbert and Luigi Gorini for this education). He demonstrated that the antibiotic streptomycin acts by inhibiting the 30S ribosome's role in protein synthesis, that this inhibition causes misreading of the genetic code, and that the most common mode of resistance reduced the accuracy of protein synthesis. At the Institute Pasteur, he established his molecular biology credentials by mapping the i and o genes of the lac operon.

At the University of Wisconsin, he returned to his original focus on antibiotics and resistance, showing that plasmid-borne streptomycin resistance genes act by inactivating the antibiotic rather than by modifying protein synthesis. These broad-ranging studies led to a deeper understanding of the bacterial ribosome and of how antibiotic resistance genes arise and spread in both bacteria and yeast. Other useful products of the lab's research include the restriction enzymes PstI and KpnI and the npt gene conferring resistance to the antibiotic G418 widely used in research. Davies was one of the early voices warning that the overuse and careless use of antibiotics would select resistant bacteria, making the antibiotics less and less effective.

== Selected publications ==
Davies has authored or co-authored more than 700 scientific papers and several books. His most highly cited publications include:

- J Davies, W Gilbert, L Gorini, 1964. Streptomycin, suppression, and the code. Proceedings of the National Academy of Sciences 51; 883-890. https://doi.org/10.1073/pnas.51.5.883.
- Davies, J. 1994. Inactivation of antibiotics and the dissemination of resistance genes 1994 Science 264:375-382. https://doi.org/10.1126/science.8153624.
- EB Goh, G Yim, W Tsui, JA McClure, MG Surette and J Davies 2002. Transcriptional modulation of bacterial gene expression by subinhibitory concentrations of antibiotics. Proceedings of the National Academy of Sciences 99, 17025-17030 https://doi.org/10.1073/pnas.252607699
- J Davies, 2007. Microbes have the last word: A drastic re‐evaluation of antimicrobial treatment is needed to overcome the threat of antibiotic‐resistant bacteria. EMBO reports 8, 616-621. https://doi.org/10.1038/sj.embor.7401022.
- Davies, J., and Davies, D. 2010. Origins and evolution of antibiotic resistance. Microbiol. Mol. Biol. Rev. 74:417-433. https://doi.org/10.1128/mmbr.00016-10.

== Awards and honours ==
- Fellow of the Royal Society, elected 1994
- Fellow of the Royal Society of Canada
- International Member of the US National Academy of Sciences since 2014
- President of the American Society for Microbiology, 2000
- American Society for Microbiology Gold Medal
- Microbiology Society Prize
- Bristol–Myers Squibb Award for Distinguished Achievement in Infectious Diseases Research in 1999
