= Princess Theodora of Liechtenstein =

Liechtensteiner royal

Princess Theodora
- Born: November 20, 2004 (age 21); Chêne-Bougeries, Geneva, Switzerland
Names
- Theodora Alexandra Isabella Antonia Nora Marie
- House: Liechtenstein
- Father: Prince Alexander of Liechtenstein
- Mother: Astrid Barbara Kohl
- Occupation: environmentalist equestrian non-profit executive

Styles of Princess Theodora of Liechtenstein
- Reference style: Her Serene Highness
- Spoken style: Your Serene Highness

Princess Theodora of Liechtenstein (20 November 2004) is an environmentalist, equestrian, and member of the Princely family of Liechtenstein. She founded the Green Teen Team Foundation, a conservationist non-profit organization, in 2014.

== Early life and education ==
Princess Theodora of Liechtenstein was born on 20 November 2004 in Chêne-Bougeries, Switzerland, to Prince Alexander of Liechtenstein, an entrepreneur, and Astrid Barbara Kohl, a German interior designer. She is the granddaughter of Prince Philipp of Liechtenstein and the great-granddaughter of Sovereign Prince Franz Joseph II and Princess Consort Gina. Theodora is a grandniece of Sovereign Prince Hans-Adam II.

Princess Theodora grew up at the Villa Sant'Andrea, her family's Italian estate near Verona. The castle was formerly a Benedictine monastery. She was educated at the Aleardo Aleardi International School of Verona and St. Louis School of Milan. After completing secondary school, she enrolled at St John's College, Cambridge to study architecture. Subsequently, she pursued a Master of Science in Sustainability, Enterprise and the Environment at the University of Oxford's Smith School of Enterprise and the Environment.

== Environmentalism ==
Theodora became interested in environmentalism and conservationism after volunteering at a zoological park in Verona. In 2014, she founded the environmentalist organization Green Teen Team Foundation to protect endangered wildlife and encourage youth involvement in conservation efforts. That same year, she partnered with the public relations company Tin Man to build awareness of her foundation's efforts in the United Kingdom. The project was officially launched at a ceremony in Verona by Dame Jane Goodall. The organization has international branches including in the United Kingdom, Italy, Australia, and Zimbabwe.

In 2015, she went on an official visit to Romania to launch a student program in Armeniș in partnership with the World Wide Fund for Nature and Rewilding Europe. She set a challenge for students in the Southern Carpathians to initiate small conservation projects for the area's bison population.

In 2016, her organization began a tortoise census. In 2017, Theodora signed an agreement with the Seychelles National Parks Authority to assist in the authority's research efforts.

She attended the World Association of Zoos and Aquariums Conference in Bangkok in 2018.

In 2020, she and her parents went on an official visit to Antarctica.

In May 2022, Theodora made an official visit to Seychelles to meet with President Wavel Ramkalawan at the State House and discuss biodiversity protection efforts and conservation projects of the Green Teen Team Foundation. During her visit, she planted a coco de mer nut in the National Botanical Garden of Seychelles. She also met with the Seychelles Sustainable Tourism Label team and with the nation's representatives of The Duke of Edinburgh's Award. Theodora announced that her foundation donated 5,000 microchips to trace Seychelles tortoises. Her official visited concluded with a trip to Curieuse Marine National Park.

Theodora is an ambassador for Project 0, a charity focused on preventing maritime plastic pollution.

== Equestrian ==
Theodora is an equestrian and competes in dressage. In 2022, she won first place in individuals and teams at the Junior Grand Prix Dressage Competition.
