= William A. Catterall =

American pharmacologist and neurobiologist (1946–2024)

William A. Catterall ForMemRS
- Born: October 12, 1946; Providence, Rhode Island, U.S.
- Died: February 28, 2024 (aged 77)
- Education: Brown University (BA), Johns Hopkins University (PhD)
- Known for: Voltage-gated ion channels
- Scientific career
- Fields: Pharmacology; neurobiology
- Workplaces: University of Washington School of Medicine
- Thesis: Structural and catalytic properties of mitochondrial ATPase (1972)
- Website: pharmacology.uw.edu/team-member/william-catterall/

William Albert Catterall (October 12, 1946 – February 28, 2024) was an American pharmacologist and neurobiologist, who researched ion channels. He was a professor of pharmacology at the University of Washington School of Medicine in Seattle, Washington and is known for his work on sodium and calcium voltage-gated ion channels.

== Life and career ==
Catterall received his B.A. in chemistry from Brown University in 1968 and his Ph.D. in physiological chemistry from Johns Hopkins University School of Medicine in 1972. He did his postdoctoral training in neurobiology and molecular pharmacology as a Muscular Dystrophy Association Fellow with Marshall Nirenberg at the NIH from 1972 to 1974. After three years as a staff scientist at the NIH, Catterall joined the University of Washington in 1977 as an associate professor of pharmacology. He earned full professorship in 1981 and served as chair of the University of Washington's pharmacology department from 1984 to 2016. Over the course of his career he published over 500 papers, and trained over 150 junior scientists in his lab.

Catterall died suddenly on February 28, 2024, at the age of 77, of a cardiac arrest.

== Honors and awards ==
Catterall was a fellow of the American Association for the Advancement of Science from 2010.

In 2003, he received the 16th annual Bristol-Myers Squibb Award for Distinguished Achievement in Neuroscience Research, in recognition of his pioneering research into sodium and calcium channel proteins.

In 2008, he was elected a Foreign Member of the Royal Society. Catterall was awarded the Canada International Gairdner Award in 2010.

- I. & H. Wachter Award, I. & H. Wachter Foundation (2010)
- Bard Lecture, Johns Hopkins University (2010)
