= Nouria Hernandez =

Swiss biologist and university rector

- Born: 13 May 1957; Chêne-Bougeries
- Education: University of Geneva (diploma, 1980); University of Heidelberg (doctorate, 1983)
- Known for: Rector of the University of Lausanne (since 2016)
- Spouse: Winship Herr
- Children: Two
- Awards: Cloëtta Prize (2007)
- Scientific career
- Fields: Molecular biology
- Workplaces: Yale University (1983–1986); Cold Spring Harbor Laboratory (1987–2004); University of Lausanne (since 2004)

Nouria Hernandez is a Swiss biologist and former rector of the University of Lausanne. She was professor of molecular biology at the University of Lausanne from 2004 to 2016. She served as rector from 2016 to 2021.

== Life and career ==
Nouria Hernandez studied at the University of Geneva (diploma in 1980) and received a doctorate from the University of Heidelberg (in 1983). From 1983 to 1986, she then worked at the Yale University. In 1987, she was nominated group leader at the Cold Spring Harbor Laboratory and, in 1988, became professor at the Watson School of Biological Sciences. In 2004, she moved to Europe and became professor at the University of Lausanne where, between 2005 and 2014, she was also director of the Centre for Integrative Genomics. In 2007, she received the Cloëtta Prize. Between 2008 and 2014, Nouria Hernandez was also a member of the central committee of the Swiss Academy of Natural Sciences.

Her research work has focused on the regulation of gene expression in mammals. During her PhD, she used an in vitro system to show that the Precursor mRNA splicing reaction could be separated from transcription. Afterwards, she worked on the transcription of the U small nuclear RNAs, which are involved in several cellular processes including Precursor mRNA splicing. This work showed that RNA polymerase II and RNA polymerase III transcription depends on several common transcription factors. She later worked on the enzyme RNA polymerase III and its effect on transcription in mice when it is deregulated. This led to the discovery of links between RNA polymerase III transcription and the regulation of growth and metabolism, in particular lipid metabolism.

In August 2015, after being selected by a vote of the University Council (by 26 votes out of 39) in June, the Council of State of Vaud nominated Nouria Hernandez as rector of the University of Lausanne from 1 August 2016. She was the first woman to lead the University of Lausanne. As rector, one of her priorities was to promote the theme of "viable development" (with the idea of survival in the long term of the next generations). She sees viable development as an interdisciplinary subject of reflection involving not only technology but also biology, ecology, philosophy, economy and politics.

In 2023, she received a honorary Doctor of Science degree from the Cold Spring Harbor School of Biological Sciences, and in 2025, she was elected to the American Academy of Arts and Sciences.
