= Fritz de Quervain =

Swiss surgeon (1868–1940)

Fritz de Quervain (4 May 1868 – 24 January 1940) was a Swiss surgeon born in Sion. He was a leading authority on thyroid disease.

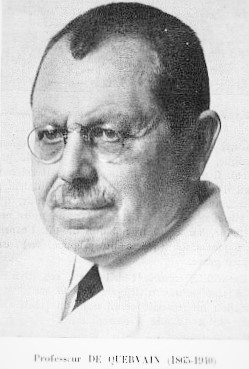
Dr. Fritz de Quervain

In 1892 he received his doctorate from the University of Bern, and several years later became director of the surgical department at a hospital in La Chaux-de-Fonds in the canton of Neuchâtel. In 1910 he was appointed to the chair of surgery at the University of Basel, and from 1918 was a professor of surgery at Bern and director of the Inselspital.

Quervain published many papers devoted to thyroid disease, ranging from the epidemiology of the disease to technical procedures on thyroidectomy. His book Spezielle chirurgische Diagnostik (Special Surgical Diagnosis) was a leading textbook on surgery in its day.

He co-developed an operating table which won the Grand Prix at the World Exhibition in Paris in 1914. Two eponymous diseases are named after Quervain:

- De Quervain's thyroiditis: Subacute, non-bacterial inflammation of the thyroid gland, often after viral infection of respiratory tract.
- De Quervain's disease: inflammation of the sheath or tunnel that surrounds two tendons that control movement of the thumb. Sometimes called "washer woman's sprain".

== See also ==
- Repetitive strain injury
- Dominique de Quervain
