= Werner and Gertrude Henle =

German husband and wife team of virologists

Werner Henle (August 27, 1910 – July 6, 1987) and Gertrude Henle (April 3, 1912 – September 1, 2006) were a husband and wife team of German-American virologists. The National Library of Medicine called them "a prodigious force in virology, immunology and viral oncology during the second half of the 20th century".

== Gertrude Henle ==
Gertrude Henle was born in 1912 in Mannheim, Germany, the daughter of Theophil Szpingier and Leonore Baumgart. Her family were Protestants and civil servants. She studied medicine at Heidelberg University, completing her degree in 1936 with a dissertation on fat tissue titled "Der Stoffwechsel der isolierten Fettgewebe".

She met Werner Henle while performing research for her doctorate at the Kaiser Wilhelm Institute for Medical Research in Heidelberg, now the Max Planck Institute, became engaged to him, and in 1937 followed him to Philadelphia, where they married on the day after her arrival. Her father died in 1938, and her mother was murdered by the Nazis in 1943.

She was appointed an instructor in microbiology at the University of Pennsylvania Medical School, now the Perelman School of Medicine. She became an associate professor in 1941, when she also joined the department of virological research at Children's Hospital of Philadelphia, and later a full professor. With her husband, she became an American citizen in 1942.

She and Werner Henle both retired in 1942. She died in 2006 in Newtown Square, Pennsylvania.

== Werner Henle ==
Werner Henle was born in 1910 in Dortmund, Germany. He was the grandson of the pathologist and anatomist Jakob Henle; his father, Adolf Henle, was a surgeon. His older sister Annemarie Henle Pope became an art historian and his older brother Fritz Henle a photographer.

Henle studied medicine at the Ludwig-Maximilians-Universität München for one year and then transferred to Heidelberg University, where he completed his degree in 1934 with a dissertation titled "Zur Frage der Ausscheidung von gruppen- und speichelspezifischen Substanzen". His dissertation was overseen by Ludolf von Krehl, the director of the Kaiser Wilhelm Institute for Medical Research. Henle had been baptized Protestant, but Jakob Henle had been Jewish, which meant that under the Nazi racial laws, he was classified as non-Aryan. He was therefore precluded by the Law for the Restoration of the Professional Civil Service from working at a university or practicing medicine in any public hospital. Krehl hired him as his assistant and in January 1935 petitioned for him to be declared an Aryan, but in 1936 Henle accepted the offer of a position as an instructor in microbiology at the University of Pennsylvania Medical School. His brother and sister also emigrated to the United States.

He and Gertrude Szpingier met at the Kaiser Wilhelm Institute, became engaged, and were married after she joined him in the United States in 1937. They both became American citizens in 1942. Together with her, he spent the remainder of his career at the University of Pennsylvania, where he was initially an instructor in the Department of Public Health and Preventive Medicine, in 1939 became Professor of Virology in Pediatrics, in 1947 became Professor of Virology, and retired in 1982. He also headed the department of virological research at Children's Hospital of Philadelphia from 1939, and was the director of the Virus Diagnostic Laboratory in the reference laboratory of the Pennsylvania Department of Health from 1947 to 1963. The Henles were both advisors to the Virus Cancer Program at the National Cancer Institute. Werner Henle also served on the Advisory Panel on Virus Diseases at the World Health Organization from 1951 to 1987, as an advisor to the Surgeon General of the United States from 1952 to 1955, as an advisor to the Surgeon General of the United States Armed Forces from 1958 to 1972, as an advisor to the National Cancer Advisory Board, on the Medical and Scientific Advisory Board of the Leukemia Society of America, and as president of the American Association of Immunologists in 1962–63.

The couple continued their joint research at Children's Hospital until shortly before his death from cancer in 1987 in Bryn Mawr, Pennsylvania.

== Research and publications ==
The Henles developed the first effective flu vaccine in 1943 and then developed a rapid diagnostic test for mumps and evaluated a mumps vaccine. With Joseph Stokes, they demonstrated the efficacy of gamma globulin against hepatitis. They are best known for their work on the Epstein-Barr virus; in 1968, they developed a vaccine for it and confirmed a link between it and infectious mononucleosis, and they also established the association between the virus and cancer, subsequently pursuing further research into oncogenic viruses that laid the groundwork for the discovery of interferon. In the 1980s they researched HIV and AIDS.

With Joseph Zellat, Werner Henle co-wrote Protection against Influenza Virus by Passive Means and by an Aerosol (1941). With Susanna Harris, Gertrude Henle co-wrote Studies on the Complement-Fixing Antigens of Mumps Virus (1948). The Henles were among the authors of the reference work The Viruses of Human Epidemic Influenza and Related Problems (1944) and jointly published more than 385 papers.

== Honors ==
Werner Henle was awarded an honorary doctorate by the University of Basel in 1971; Gertrude Henle was awarded an honorary doctorate by the Pennsylvania College of Medicine in 1975. He was elected to the National Academy of Sciences in 1975, she in 1979, one of the first women to receive the distinction. They were joint recipients of awards including:

- E. Mead Johnson Award (1950)
- Robert Koch Prize (1971)
- National Cancer Institute Virus Cancer Program Award (1975)
- William B. Coley Award (1975)
- Bristol-Myers Squibb Award for Distinguished Achievement in Cancer Research (1979; for work on the Epstein-Barr virus)
- Gold Medal of the Children's Hospital of Philadelphia (1983; for the development of flu and mumps vaccines)
