= Cloëtta Prize =

The Cloëtta Prize (German: Cloëtta-Preis; French: Prix Cloëtta) is a Swiss distinction to honour personalities who have distinguished themselves in biomedical research.

Worth 50,000 Swiss francs, it has been awarded annually by the Max Cloëtta Foundation (based in Zurich), since 1974.

== Laureates ==
Source: Cloetta

- 2025: Nicola Aceto, Virginie Hamel, and Paul Guichard
- 2024: Andrea Ablasser and Andrea Alimonti
- 2023: Christoph Hess and Sebastian Jessberger
- 2022: Doron Merkler and Annette Oxenius
- 2021: Bart Deplancke and Anne Müller
- 2020: Mohamed Bentires-Alj and Nadia Mercader Huber
- 2019: Botond Roska and Oliver Distler
- 2018: Tim Schroeder (Swiss Federal Institute of Technology (ETH)) and Johanna Joyce (Lausanne University)
- 2017: Denis Jabaudon (University of Geneva)) and Markus G. Manz (University Hospital of Zürich)
- 2016: Michel Gilliet (University Hospital of Lausanne) and Andreas Lüthi (Friedrich Miescher Institute)
- 2015: Dominique Soldati-Favre (University of Geneva) and Fritjof Helmchen (University of Zurich).
- 2014: Henrik Kaessmann (University of Lausanne) and Marc Donath (University Hospital of Basel).
- 2013: Andreas Papassotiropoulos and Dominique J.-F. de Quervain
- 2012: Olaf Blanke (École polytechnique fédérale de Lausanne)
- 2011: Petra S. Hüppi
- 2010: Christian Lüscher and Burkhard Becher
- 2009: Margot Thome Miazza (University of Lausanne) and Walter Reith
- 2008: Darius Moradpour (University Hospital of Lausanne) and Sabine Werner
- 2007: Nouria Hernandez (University of Lausanne) and François Mach
- 2006: Adrian Merlo and Michael Hengartner
- 2005: Urs Albrecht and Dominique Muller
- 2004: Amalio Telenti and Radek Skoda
- 2003: Michael N. Hall and Bernhard Moser
- 2002: Bernard Thorens and Andrea Superti-Furga
- 2001: Isabel Roditi and Thierry Calandra
- 2000: Giuseppe Pantaleo and Brian Hemmings
- 1999: Clemens A. Dahinden and Antonio Lanzavecchia
- 1998: Adriano Aguzzi and Primus E. Mullis
- 1997: Gerard Waeber and Denis Duboule
- 1996: Lukas C. Kühn and Peter Sonderegger
- 1995: Jürg Reichen and George Thomas jr.
- 1994: Hans Rudolf Brenner and Daniel Pablo Lew
- 1993: Paolo Meda and Adriano Fontana
- 1992: Michel Aguet (University of Zurich)
- 1991: Peter J. Meier-Abt and Jacques Philippe
- 1990: Martin E. Schwab and Denis Monard
- 1989: Heini Murer and Hugh Robson MacDonald
- 1988: Jean-Dominique Vassalli and Hans Hengartner
- 1987: Jacques Louis and Joachim Seelig
- 1986: Ueli Schibler and Walter Schaffner
- 1985: Hans Thoenen and Roberto Montesano
- 1984: Heidi Diggelmann and Jean-François Borel
- 1983: Peter Böhlen and Claes B. Wollheim
- 1982: Jürgen Zapf and Jean-Michel Dayer
- 1981: Rolf Zinkernagel and Peter A. Cerutti
- 1980: Edward W. Flückiger and Albert Burger
- 1979: Theodor Koller and Jean-Pierre Kraehenbuehl
- 1978: Susumu Tonegawa
- 1977: Franz Oesch
- 1976: Rui C. de Sousa
- 1975: Hans Bürgi
- 1974: Urs A. Meyer

== See also ==
- List of biomedical science awards
