= Brian Hemmings =

British biochemist

- Born: Brian Arthur Hemmings
- Education: University of Nottingham (BSc); University of East Anglia (PhD)
- Awards: Cloëtta Prize (2000); FRS (2009)
- Scientific career
- Thesis: The Regulation of Glutamate Metabolism in Yeast (1975)
- Website: Brian A. Hemmings

Brian Arthur Hemmings FRS is a British biochemist, and Senior Group Leader, at the Friedrich Miescher Institute for Biomedical Research. He is a member of the Faculty of 1000.

== Education ==
He was educated at the University of Nottingham (BSc, 1972) and the University of East Anglia (PhD, 1975).
