= Eric Manvers Shooter =

British neuroscientist

Eric Manvers Shooter FRS
- Born: 18 April 1924; Nottinghamshire, England
- Died: 21 March 2018 (aged 93)
- Citizenship: United Kingdom
- Education: Cambridge University (PhD 1949)
- Known for: Nerve growth factor (NGF)
- Awards: Ralph W. Gerard Prize (1995); Bristol-Myers Squibb Award (1997)
- Scientific career
- Fields: Neurobiology
- Academic advisors: Paley Johnson
- Doctoral students: Ronald Vale

Eric Manvers Shooter (born 18 April 1924 in Nottinghamshire, England; died 21 March 2018) was an English scientist known for investigating the biochemistry of nerve growth factor (NGF). From 1961 onwards he was affiliated with Stanford University School of Medicine, where he was founding chairman of the Department of Neurobiology (1975–1987).

== Biography ==
Shooter attended the University of Cambridge, earning bachelor's (1945) and doctoral (1949) degrees in chemistry. After a brief postdoctoral fellowship at the University of Wisconsin, and having made some notable discoveries about the genetics of haemoglobin while a lecturer at University College London, he moved to the Department of Biochemistry at Stanford as a research fellow in 1961. He was subsequently appointed associate professor of genetics (1963) and professor of biochemistry (1968), and chaired the school's doctoral program in neurosciences from 1972 until 1982. He chaired the Department of Neurobiology from its inception in 1975 until 1987. In 1988 he co-founded the New York-based biotechnology company Regeneron Pharmaceuticals. His research group continued to be productive until his retirement in 2004.

== Research ==
Shooter was acknowledged for his work on neurotrophins — proteins that induce the differentiation and survival of nerve cells. At the suggestion of Joshua Lederberg he spent three years intensively studying the structure and mechanisms of the canonical neurotrophin NGF. He also characterized the PMP22 gene in mice, defects in which cause the myelin sheath that protects nerve cells to break down in a way that resembles human neurological diseases called demyelinating peripheral neuropathies. These discoveries provided part of the foundation for understanding how nerves repair themselves. His group remained productive into the early 2000s with the discovery that the neurotrophin BDNF enhances myelin formation.

== Awards and honours ==
Shooter was awarded two international prizes jointly with the Swiss neuroscientist Hans Thoenen: the Ralph W. Gerard Prize in Neuroscience of the Society for Neuroscience (1995) and the Bristol-Myers Squibb Award for Distinguished Achievement in Neuroscience Research (1997). He was elected to the Royal Society in 1988, and was a member of the National Academy of Sciences, the American Academy of Arts and Sciences, and the American Philosophical Society. Notwithstanding these personal achievements, he took the greatest satisfaction from the success of his students and postdoctoral trainees.

== Philanthropy ==
In 2014 he endowed the Shooter Family Professorship at Stanford, currently held by the chair of neurobiology Thomas Clandinin.
