= Hans Thoenen =

Swiss psychiatrist

- Born: 5 May 1928; Zweisimmen, Switzerland
- Died: 23 June 2012 (aged 84); Munich, Germany
- Citizenship: Switzerland
- Education: University of Bern (MD 1957)
- Awards: Ernst Jung Gold Medal (2007); Bristol-Myers Squibb Award (1997); Ralph W. Gerard Prize (1995); Neuronal Plasticity Prize (1994); Charles A. Dana Award (1994); Cloëtta Prize (1985); Feldberg Award (1980)
- Scientific career
- Fields: neurobiology
- Institutions: Max Planck Institute for Neurobiology; Max Planck Institute for Psychiatry; Biozentrum University of Basel; Hoffman-LaRoche

Hans Thoenen (5 May 1928 in Zweisimmen, Switzerland – 23 June 2012 in Munich, Germany) was a Swiss neurobiologist best known for his work on neurotrophins.

== Biography ==
Thoenen studied medicine at the Universities of Bern and Innsbruck, graduating in 1953 and receiving his doctorate from Bern in 1957. In 1961 he joined the research laboratories of the Swiss pharmaceutical company Hoffmann LaRoche, leaving in 1968 to spend a year working with the Axelrod group at NIMH. In 1971 he joined the newly-formed Biocentre at the University of Basel as research group leader in Neurobiology. In 1977 he relocated to Munich where the Max Planck Institute for Psychiatry had offered him the directorship of a new institute – what is now the Max Planck Institute for Neurobiology – which he led until his retirement in 1996.

== Research ==
While testing dopamine analogues at Hoffman-LaRoche, he was surprised by the toxicity of 6-hydroxydopamine on sympathetic nerves and investigated its mechanisms of action. Its selective effect on dopaminergic neurons has made it a useful tool in animal models of Parkinson's disease.

This line of research had an unexpected payoff. While working with Axelrod at NIMH, Thoenen discovered that repeated stimulation of the adrenal medulla led to increased levels of the monoamine synthesis enzyme tyrosine hydroxylase. Trans-synaptic enzyme induction had never previously been detected: it transpired that it was a general phenomenon.

At Basel, his attention turned to nerve growth factor and other neurotrophins. His laboratory made a series of groundbreaking contributions to the field, including the cloning of brain derived neurotrophic factor and ciliary neurotrophic factor. Almost all his subsequent research focused on this class of proteins, the elucidation of their physiological functions, and the factors that influenced their expression and release – including other growth factors, the presynaptic release of neurotransmitters, glucocorticosteroids, and stress. His work has been instrumental in demonstrating the importance of neurotrophins for brain plasticity (the formation and pruning of synaptic connections in, for example, learning and memory), and has pursued their relevance for remediating nerve damage and dementia.

== Awards ==
Thoenen won the Feldberg Award (1980), the Cloëtta Prize (1985), the Charles A. Dana Award for Pioneering Achievement in Health (1994) and the Neuronal Plasticity Prize (1994). He received the Ralph W. Gerard Prize in Neuroscience of the Society for Neuroscience (1995), the ECNP Neuropsychopharmacology Award (1996), and the Bristol-Myers Squibb Award for Distinguished Achievement in Neuroscience Research (1997) jointly with Eric M. Shooter. He was awarded the Ernst Jung Gold Medal in 2007. He was a member of the German Academy of Sciences Leopoldina and a foreign member of the National Academy of Sciences. He received honorary doctorates from the Universities of Würzburg and Zurich.
