= Tyrique Bartlett =

South African footballer (born 1999)

Personal information
- Date of birth: 14 April 1999 (age 27)
- Place of birth: Chêne-Bougeries, Switzerland
- Position: Forward

Youth career
- –2017: University of Pretoria
- 2017–2019: Newcastle United

Senior career*
Years	Team	Apps	(Gls)
2020	Cape Umoya United	4	(1)
2021	FC Windisch		
2021–2022	Cape Town Spurs	17	(2)
- * Club domestic league appearances and goals as of 11:34, 16 March 2023 (UTC)

Tyrique Bartlett (born 14 April 1999) is a South African professional soccer player who plays as a forward.

== Club career ==
In June 2017, Bartlett joined Newcastle United on a three-year deal after a successful trial. In June 2019, he was released by Newcastle United. In February 2020, he joined National First Division side Cape Umoya United on a free transfer. On 28 February 2020, he made his professional league debut as a substitute in a 2–0 loss to Marumo Gallants. In September 2021, he signed for Swiss side FC Windisch. In December 2021, Bartlett joined Cape Town Spurs.

== International career ==
In August 2017, Bartlett was called up to the South Africa U20 squad for the first time.

== Personal life ==
Bartlett was born in Switzerland. He is the son of former South Africa international footballer Shaun Bartlett.
