= Sabine Werner =

German biochemist

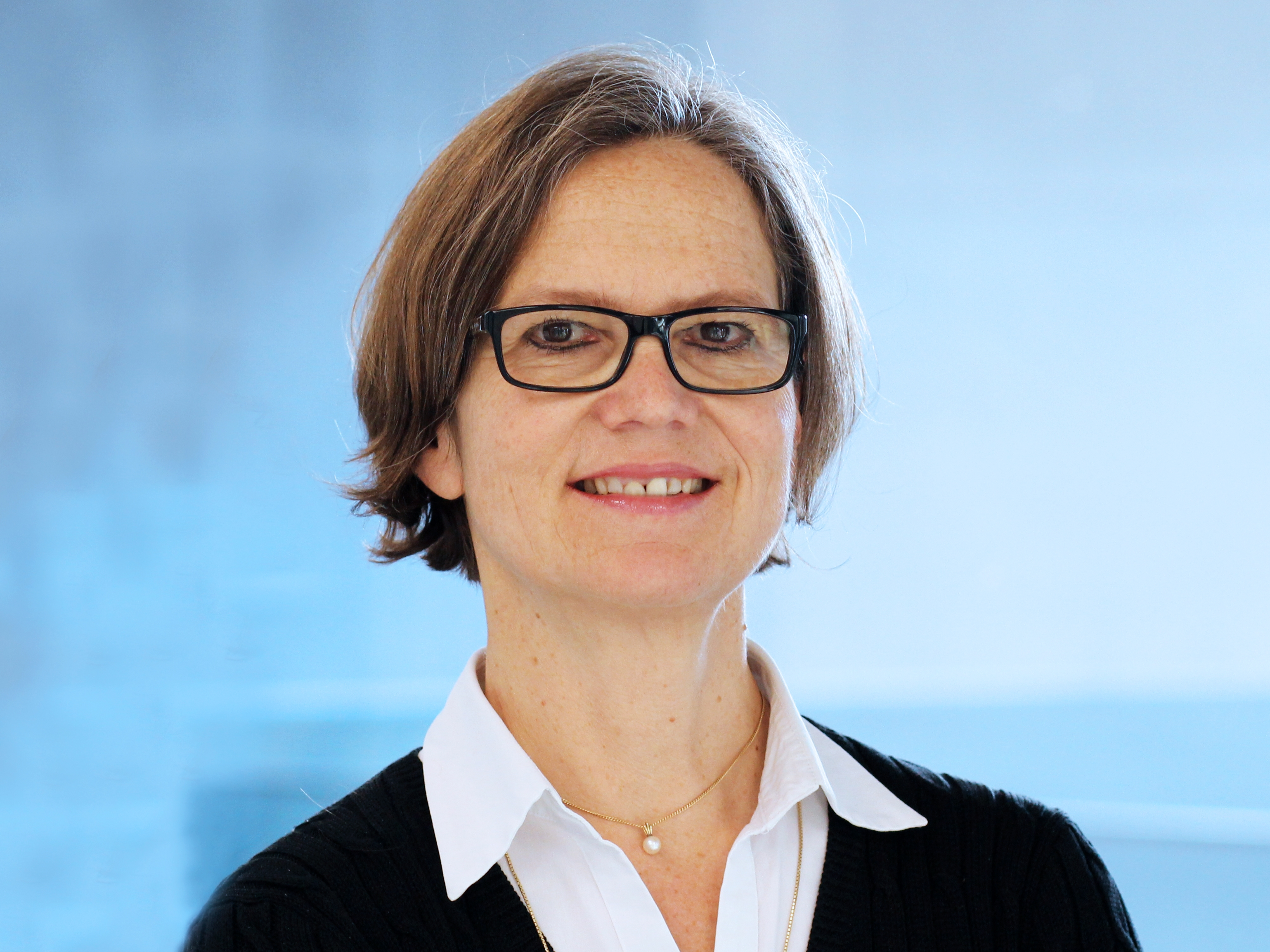
- Werner in 2017
- Born: 5 September 1960; Tübingen

Sabine Werner (born 5 September 1960) is a German biochemist and professor.

== Biography ==
Sabine Werner was born on 5 September 1960 in Tübingen, Germany. She attended Universities of Tübingen and Munich (LMU) where she studied Biochemistry. Her PhD was in cancer research at the Max Planck Institute of Biochemistry, completed in 1989. Werner then went to the University of California San Francisco working on growth factor action and tissue repair. Werner took a position as group leader at the Max-Planck-Institute from 1993 to 1999 while also working as an Associate Professor at LMU Munich. In 1999, Werner became the Professor of Cell Biology at ETH Zürich. Werner was awarded the Pfizer Academic Award in 1998.

== Research ==
Werner is known for her research on tissue regeneration, especially focusing on growth factors and reactive oxygen species. Her research has potential applications to the study of cancer.

== Selected publications ==
- Gurtner, Geoffrey C.; Werner, Sabine; Barrandon, Yann; Longaker, Michael T. (May 2008). "Wound repair and regeneration" (PDF). Nature. 453 (7193): 314–321. Bibcode:2008Natur.453..314G. doi:10.1038/nature07039. PMID 18480812. S2CID 205213660.
- Werner, Sabine; Grose, Richard (July 2003). "Regulation of Wound Healing by Growth Factors and Cytokines". Physiological Reviews. 83 (3): 835–870. doi:10.1152/physrev.2003.83.3.835. PMID 12843410.
- Werner, S.; Peters, K. G.; Longaker, M. T.; Fuller-Pace, F.; Banda, M. J.; Williams, L. T. (1 August 1992). "Large induction of keratinocyte growth factor expression in the dermis during wound healing". Proceedings of the National Academy of Sciences. 89 (15): 6896–6900. Bibcode:1992PNAS...89.6896W. doi:10.1073/pnas.89.15.6896. ISSN 0027-8424. PMC 49611. PMID 1379725.

== Awards ==
- Elected member, European Academy of Sciences (2020)
- Elected member, European Molecular Biology Organization (2012)
- Elected member, German National Academy of Sciences Leopoldina (2011)
