= Burkhard (surname) =

Burkhard is a German language surname. Notable people with the surname include:

- Amy Burkhard Evans, American actress and musical director
- André Burkhard (born 1950), French former professional footballer
- Balthasar Burkhard (1944–2010), Swiss photographer
- Christoph Burkhard (born 1984), German former professional footballer
- Emil Walter Burkhard (1900–1952), Spanish footballer
- Franz Burkhard (born 1931), Swiss former wrestler
- Gedeon Burkhard (born 1969), German film and television actor
- Georg Franz Burkhard Kloss (1787–1854), German historian of freemasonry
- Hans Burkhard (born 1973), Liechtensteiner cyclist
- Marcel Burkhard (born 1951), Swiss judoka
- Oliver Burkhard, chairman and CEO of ThyssenKrupp Marine Systems
- Paul Burkhard (1911–1977), Swiss composer
- Thierry Burkhard (born 1964), French Army general
- Tom Burkhard (born 1963), American television producer and writer
- Verona Burkhard (1910–2004), American artist
- Willy Burkhard (1900–1955), Swiss composer
- Yolanda Burkhard (1930–1998), Canadian politician

== See also ==
- Frank-Burkhard Habel, German scholar of the film and television industries
- Burkhard (given name)
- Burkhardt (surname)
- Burghardt
- Burchard (name)
