= João Monteiro (editor) =

Brazilian doctor and academic

João P. Monteiro is a Brazilian doctor, academic and the chief editor of Nature Medicine.

== Early life and education ==
Monteiro was born in Brazil. He obtained his medical degree from the Federal University of Rio de Janeiro where he also obtained his PhD studying the mechanisms of tolerance to self-antigens in autoimmune diseases.

== Career ==
After his PhD, Monteiro moved to the US having been awarded a postdoctoral fellowship from The Pew Charitable Trust to study T cell antigen recognition and in vivo dynamics of the immune responses at the National Institutes of Health.

In 2013, Monteiro joined Cell where he worked as the senior editor for immunology and translational medicine until 2017. In 2017 be was appointed as the chief editor of Nature Medicine. In 2021, he joined the International Committee of Medical Journal Editors.

== Personal life ==
Monteiro is based in New York City, USA.
