= Chêne-Bougeries =

- Municipality
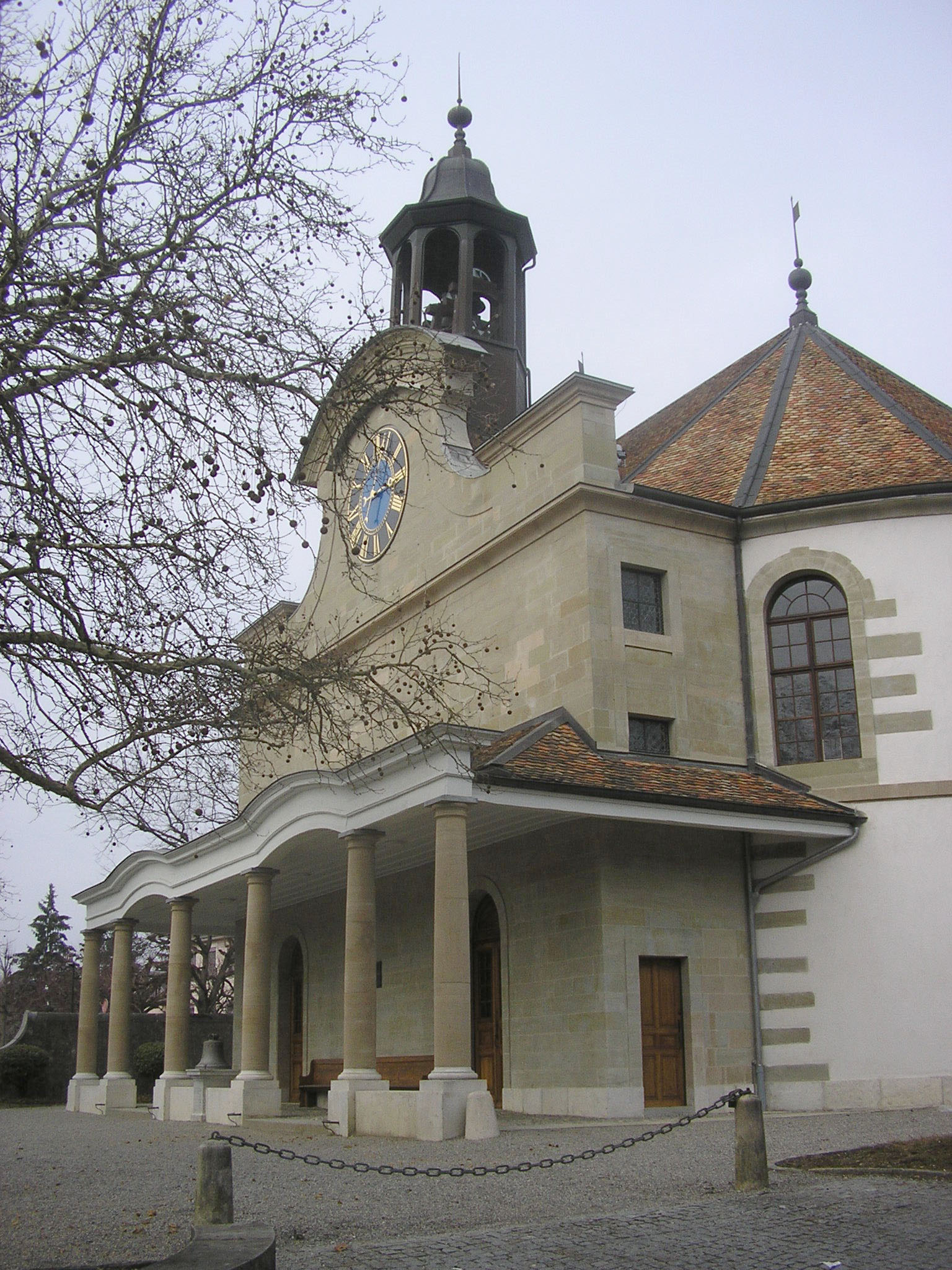

- Flag Coat of arms
- Location of Chêne-Bougeries
- Location within Switzerland Location within Canton of Geneva
- Coordinates: 46°11′N 6°11′E
- Country: Switzerland
- Canton: Geneva
- District: n.a.

Government
  - Mayor: Maire; Florian Gross

Area
  - Total: 4.13 km^{2} (1.59 sq mi)
- Elevation: 420 m (1,380 ft)

Population (December 2020)
  - Total: 12,621
  - Density: 3,060/km^{2} (7,910/sq mi)
- Time zone: UTC+01:00 (CET)
  - Summer (DST): UTC+02:00 (CEST)
- Postal code: 1224
- SFOS number: 6612
- ISO 3166 code: CH-GE
- Surrounded by: Cologny, Chêne-Bourg, Geneva, Thônex, Vandoeuvres, Veyrier
- Website: chene-bougeries.ch

Chêne-Bougeries is a municipality in the Canton of Geneva, Switzerland.

== History ==
Chêne-Bougeries is first mentioned in 1270 as Quercus. In 1801 it was mentioned as Chêne-les-Bougeries.

Chêne-Bougeries was inhabited for most of its history, and neither the Romans nor the Genevans settled there. An important concern for the Genevans was the leprosy hospital that occupied part of the commune; it is only when this illness was defeated around the 16th century that Chêne-Bougeries really started to develop.

During the French Revolution the territory was occupied by the French. In 1798 the commune was forced to merge with the neighbouring communes of Chêne-Thônex and Chêne-Bourg to create a new entity, the Trois-Chêne. In 1801, however, it was able to regain the autonomous commune status, while Chêne-Thônex and Chêne-Bourg remained unified. In 1816, Chêne-Bougeries, as many of other neighboring communes, became part of a newly Swiss Geneva. Incidentally, Chêne-Thônex was subsequently called Thônex when dissensions led to a new separation with Chêne-Bourg in 1869.

The three communes are still referred today as Trois-Chêne and close ties are still in place. Work on social security, medical assistance, cultural offerings and sport infrastructure, to name a few, are operated in close cooperation between the three.

While it used to be an agricultural commune for most of its history, Chêne-Bougeries, due to its close position to the city of Geneva, became essentially residential, attracting middle to very high revenue families.

== Geography ==
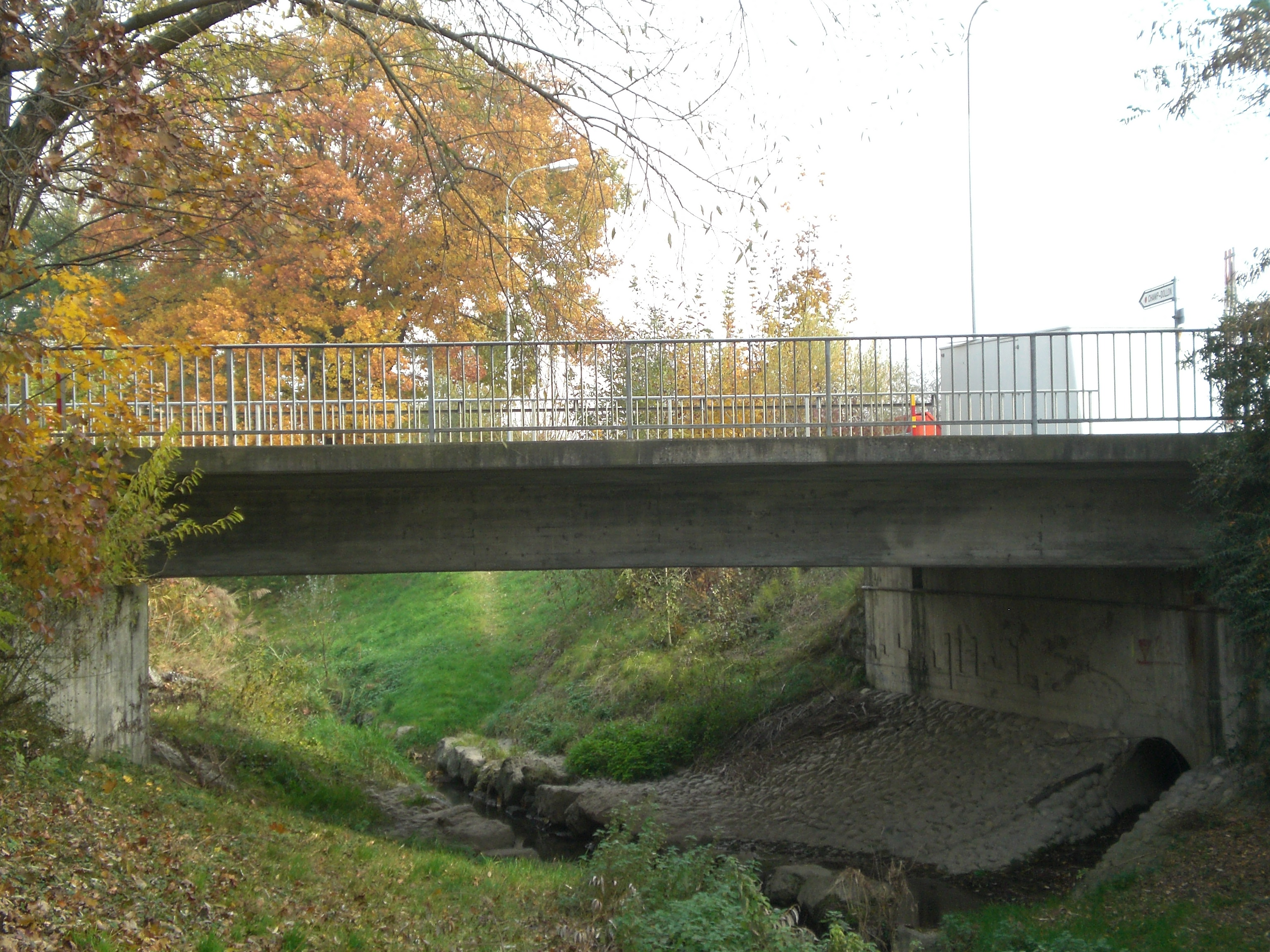
Bochet Bridge over the Seymaz

Chêne-Bougeries has an area, as of 2009, of 4.13 square kilometers (1.59 sq mi). Of this area, 0.42 km^{2} (0.16 sq mi) or 10.2% is used for agricultural purposes, while 0.24 km^{2} (0.093 sq mi) or 5.8% is forested. Of the rest of the land, 3.44 km^{2} (1.33 sq mi) or 83.3% is settled (buildings or roads), 0.04 km^{2} (9.9 acres) or 1.0% is either rivers or lakes.

Of the built up area, housing and buildings made up 66.8% and transportation infrastructure made up 11.6%. while parks, green belts and sports fields made up 3.9%. Out of the forested land, 3.4% of the total land area is heavily forested and 2.4% is covered with orchards or small clusters of trees. Of the agricultural land, 5.1% is used for growing crops and 2.9% is pastures, while 2.2% is used for orchards or vine crops. All the water in the municipality is flowing water.

The municipality is located to the left of Lake Geneva and to the right of the Seymaz. It borders the city of Geneva which is connected by three major roads as well as tram and bus lines. It consists of the town center and the neighborhoods of Grange-Canal, Malagnou, Le Vallon, La Pommière and Conches as well as the new high-rise developments of La Gradelle and La Montagne.

The municipality of Chêne-Bougeries consists of the sub-sections or villages of Boucle-de-Conches, Conches - La-Petite-Paumière, Conches - Vert-Pré, Bougeries - Clos-du-Velours, Bougeries - Chapeau, Chevillarde - Ermitage, Grange-Canal, Gradelle, Grange-Falquet, Rigaud - Montagne, Chêne-Bougeries - village.

== Name ==
The name of Chêne-Bougeries derives from a massive oak that used to limit the build land with the forestry camps, called the Bougeries.

== Demographics ==
Largest groups of foreign residents 2013
Nationality	Amount	% total (population)
France	817	7.7
Portugal	455	4.3
Italy	387	3.7
UK	239	2.3
Spain	186	1.8
USA	143	1.3
Germany	119	1.1
Russia	111	1.0
Belgium	88	0.8
Netherlands	78	0.7
Brazil	47	0.4
Kosovo	45	0.4
Poland	44	0.4
Canada	44	0.4
Turkey	36	0.3
Greece	33	0.3
Serbia	33	0.3
Iran	33	0.3
Japan	31	0.3
Austria	29	0.3

Chêne-Bougeries has a population (as of December 2020) of 12,621. As of 2008, 31.2% of the population are resident foreign nationals. Over the last 10 years (1999–2009 ) the population has changed at a rate of 7.6%. It has changed at a rate of 13.1% due to migration and at a rate of -5.6% due to births and deaths.

Most of the population (as of 2000) speaks French (7,631 or 78.2%), with English being second most common (584 or 6.0%) and German being third (481 or 4.9%). There are 7 people who speak Romansh.

As of 2008, the gender distribution of the population was 46.9% male and 53.1% female. The population was made up of 3,199 Swiss men (30.7% of the population) and 1,682 (16.2%) non-Swiss men. There were 3,842 Swiss women (36.9%) and 1,691 (16.2%) non-Swiss women. Of the population in the municipality 1,515 or about 15.5% were born in Chêne-Bougeries and lived there in 2000. There were 2,508 or 25.7% who were born in the same canton, while 1,559 or 16.0% were born somewhere else in Switzerland, and 3,571 or 36.6% were born outside of Switzerland.

In 2008 there were 66 live births to Swiss citizens and 25 births to non-Swiss citizens, and in same time span there were 116 deaths of Swiss citizens and 20 non-Swiss citizen deaths. Ignoring immigration and emigration, the population of Swiss citizens decreased by 50 while the foreign population increased by 5. There were 12 Swiss men and 23 Swiss women who emigrated from Switzerland. At the same time, there were 98 non-Swiss men and 109 non-Swiss women who immigrated from another country to Switzerland. Alain Delon, the famous French actor has a villa in Chêne-Bourgerie and had lived there for some time with his two youngest children Anoushka, and Alain Delon Jr. Delon was naturalised on September 23, 1999, as a Swiss citizen and was a citizen of the town. The total Swiss population change in 2008 (from all sources, including moves across municipal borders) was an increase of 78 and the non-Swiss population increased by 100 people. This represents a population growth rate of 1.8%.

The age distribution of the population (as of 2000) is children and teenagers (0–19 years old) make up 22.6% of the population, while adults (20–64 years old) make up 57.8% and seniors (over 64 years old) make up 19.6%.

As of 2000, there were 3,841 people who were single and never married in the municipality. There were 4,534 married individuals, 657 widows or widowers and 727 individuals who are divorced.

As of 2000, there were 4,025 private households in the municipality, and an average of 2.2 persons per household. There were 1,532 households that consist of only one person and 264 households with five or more people. Out of a total of 4,159 households that answered this question, 36.8% were households made up of just one person and there were 29 adults who lived with their parents. Of the rest of the households, there are 989 married couples without children, 1,162 married couples with children There were 259 single parents with a child or children. There were 54 households that were made up of unrelated people and 134 households that were made up of some sort of institution or another collective housing.

In 2000 there were 1,074 single family homes (or 70.6% of the total) out of a total of 1,522 inhabited buildings. There were 282 multi-family buildings (18.5%), along with 106 multi-purpose buildings that were mostly used for housing (7.0%) and 60 other use buildings (commercial or industrial) that also had some housing (3.9%). Of the single family homes 235 were built before 1919, while 132 were built between 1990 and 2000.

In 2000 there were 4,426 apartments in the municipality. The most common apartment size was 3 rooms of which there were 831. There were 441 single room apartments and 1,630 apartments with five or more rooms. Of these apartments, a total of 3,897 apartments (88.0% of the total) were permanently occupied, while 429 apartments (9.7%) were seasonally occupied and 100 apartments (2.3%) were empty. As of 2009, the construction rate of new housing units was 1.5 new units per 1000 residents. The vacancy rate for the municipality, in 2010, was 0.22%.

The historical population is given in the following chart:

== Notable people ==
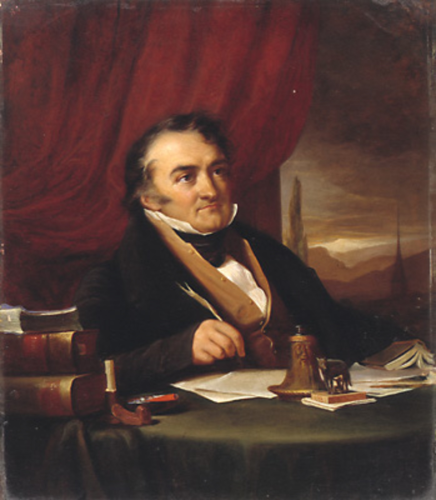
Jean Charles de Sismondi

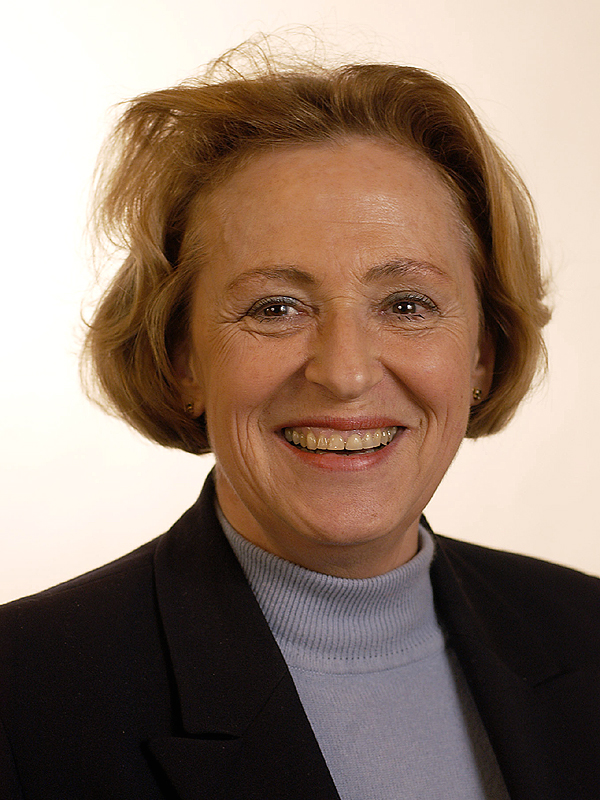
Françoise Saudan

- Horace Bénédict de Saussure (1740 in Conches – 1799) a geologist, meteorologist, physicist and mountaineer.
- Jean Charles Léonard de Sismondi (1773 – 1842 in Chêne-Bougeries) an historian and political economist.
- Napoléon Aubin (1812 in Chêne-Bougeries – 1890) a journalist, writer, publisher, scientist, musician and lithographer
- Casimir de Candolle (1836 – 1918 in Chêne-Bougeries) a Swiss botanist
- Maria Yakunchikova (1870–1902 in Chêne-Bougeries) a Russian painter, graphic artist and embroiderer
- Alain Delon (1935-2024) French actor, naturalised 1999 after having lived there since 1985. He is a citizen of Chêne-Bourgeries
- Françoise Saudan (born 1939) a Swiss politician, elected to the Grand Council of Geneva in 1985, lives in Chêne-Bougeries
- Nouria Hernandez (born 1957 in Chêne-Bougeries) biologist and rector of the University of Lausanne
- Erik Truffaz (born 1960 in Chêne-Bougeries) a French jazz trumpeter
- Princess Theodora of Liechtenstein (born 2004), environmentalist

Sport

- Joël Retornaz (born 1983 in Chêne-Bougeries) an Italian curler
- Kevin Mbabu (born 1995 in Chêne-Bougeries) a Swiss football defender
- Kilian Pagliuca (born 1996 in Chêne-Bougeries) a Swiss footballer
- Tyrique Bartlett

== Heritage sites of national significance ==
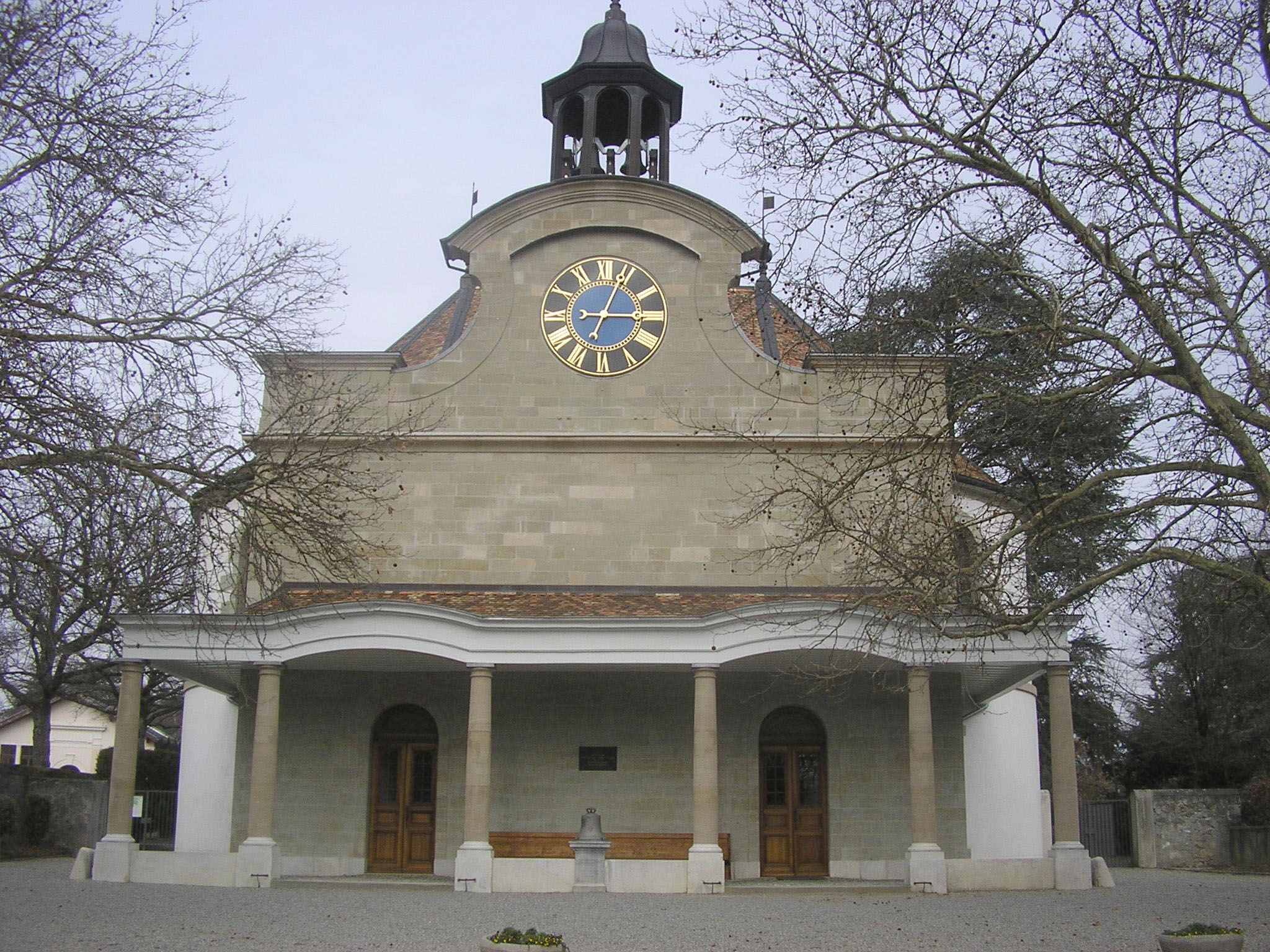
The Temple of Chêne Bougeries was built in 1758

The Grange Falquet and the Temple are listed as Swiss heritage sites of national significance.

== Sights ==
Chêne-Bougeries hosts an annex (Annexe de Conches) of the Musée d'ethnographie de Genève, Geneva's ethnographic museum.

== Politics ==
The parliament, composed of 23 people, is dominated by the Parti Libéral Genevois, the main right-wing political party of the Canton. The mayor's office, called the Conseil Administratif, is composed by 3 people: the rotating president becomes the mayor. Currently, it is Mr Emile Biedermann.

In the 2007 federal election the most popular party was the LPS Party which received 27.61% of the vote. The next three most popular parties were the SVP (20.1%), the SP (14.54%) and the Green Party (14.07%). In the federal election, a total of 3,026 votes were cast, and the voter turnout was 53.0%.

In the 2009 Grand Conseil election, there were a total of 5,745 registered voters of which 2,673 (46.5%) voted. The most popular party in the municipality for this election was the Libéral with 31.5% of the ballots. In the canton-wide election they received the highest proportion of votes. The second most popular party was the Les Verts (with 13.9%), they were also second in the canton-wide election, while the third most popular party was the Les Radicaux (with 10.4%), they were sixth in the canton-wide election.

For the 2009 Conseil d'Etat election, there were a total of 5,740 registered voters of which 3,024 (52.7%) voted.

In 2011, all the municipalities held local elections, and in Chêne-Bougeries there were 25 spots open on the municipal council. There were a total of 7,207 registered voters of which 3,131 (43.4%) voted. Out of the 3,131 votes, there were 18 blank votes, 11 null or unreadable votes and 147 votes with a name that was not on the list.

== Economy ==
As of 2010, Chêne-Bougeries had an unemployment rate of 4%. As of 2008, there were 5 people employed in the primary economic sector and about 2 businesses involved in this sector. 297 people were employed in the secondary sector and there were 51 businesses in this sector. 2,835 people were employed in the tertiary sector, with 283 businesses in this sector. There were 4,361 residents of the municipality who were employed in some capacity, of which females made up 45.2% of the workforce.

In 2008 the total number of full-time equivalent jobs was 2,536. The number of jobs in the primary sector was 4, all of which were in agriculture. The number of jobs in the secondary sector was 287 of which 62 or (21.6%) were in manufacturing and 225 (78.4%) were in construction. The number of jobs in the tertiary sector was 2,245. In the tertiary sector; 197 or 8.8% were in wholesale or retail sales or the repair of motor vehicles, 29 or 1.3% were in the movement and storage of goods, 76 or 3.4% were in a hotel or restaurant, 53 or 2.4% were in the information industry, 20 or 0.9% were the insurance or financial industry, 154 or 6.9% were technical professionals or scientists, 558 or 24.9% were in education and 959 or 42.7% were in health care.

In 2000, there were 2,635 workers who commuted into the municipality and 3,681 workers who commuted away. The municipality is a net exporter of workers, with about 1.4 workers leaving the municipality for every one entering. About 14.7% of the workforce coming into Chêne-Bougeries are coming from outside Switzerland, while 0.2% of the locals commute out of Switzerland for work. Of the working population, 31.2% used public transportation to get to work, and 48.2% used a private car.

== Religion ==
From the 2000 census, 3,441 or 35.3% were Roman Catholic, while 2,178 or 22.3% belonged to the Swiss Reformed Church. Of the rest of the population, there were 239 members of an Orthodox church (or about 2.45% of the population), there were 8 individuals (or about 0.08% of the population) who belonged to the Christian Catholic Church, and there were 180 individuals (or about 1.84% of the population) who belonged to another Christian church. There were 284 individuals (or about 2.91% of the population) who were Jewish, and 236 (or about 2.42% of the population) who were Islamic. There were 23 individuals who were Buddhist, 18 individuals who were Hindu and 29 individuals who belonged to another church. 2,155 (or about 22.08% of the population) belonged to no church, are agnostic or atheist, and 968 individuals (or about 9.92% of the population) did not answer the question.

== Education ==
In Chêne-Bougeries about 2,580 or (26.4%) of the population have completed non-mandatory upper secondary education, and 2,800 or (28.7%) have completed additional higher education (either university or a Fachhochschule). Of the 2,800 who completed tertiary schooling, 38.4% were Swiss men, 33.6% were Swiss women, 16.3% were non-Swiss men and 11.8% were non-Swiss women.

During the 2009–2010 school year there were a total of 1,868 students in the Chêne-Bougeries school system. The education system in the Canton of Geneva allows young children to attend two years of non-obligatory kindergarten. During that school year, there were 135 children who were in a pre-kindergarten class. The canton's school system provides two years of non-mandatory kindergarten and requires students to attend six years of primary school, with some of the children attending smaller, specialized classes. In Chêne-Bougeries there were 214 students in kindergarten or primary school and 37 students were in the special, smaller classes. The secondary school program consists of three lower, obligatory years of schooling, followed by three to five years of optional, advanced schools. There were 214 lower secondary students who attended school in Chêne-Bougeries. There were 376 upper secondary students from the municipality along with 73 students who were in a professional, non-university track program. An additional 519 students attended a private school.

As of 2000, there were 2,350 students in Chêne-Bougeries who came from another municipality, while 921 residents attended schools outside the municipality.
