= Philip Majerus =

American biochemist (1936–2016)

Philip Warren Majerus
- Born: July 10, 1936; Chicago
- Died: June 8, 2016 (aged 79); University City, Missouri
- Education: University of Notre Dame; Washington University in St. Louis; Massachusetts General Hospital
- Known for: confirmed that low-dose aspirin potentially lowers deaths from stroke and heart attacks
- Scientific career
- Fields: Medicine, biochemistry
- Workplaces: National Heart Institute; Washington University School of Medicine

Philip Warren Majerus (July 10, 1936 – June 8, 2016) was an American biochemist who confirmed the cardiovascular benefits of aspirin. After graduating from medical school and completing a residency at Massachusetts General Hospital, Majerus conducted research at the National Heart Institute before becoming a faculty member at the Washington University School of Medicine.

== Early life ==
A native of Chicago and the son of a five-and-dime store owner, Majerus grew up in Quincy, Illinois. As a child, he had no interest in any school subject other than science, and he seemed to thrive once one of his schoolteachers set up a chemistry laboratory where Majerus could perform hands-on experiments.

Majerus was a talented tennis player, which earned him an athletic scholarship to the University of Notre Dame, where he completed an undergraduate degree in 1958. Majerus graduated from medical school at the Washington University School of Medicine.

== Career ==
After completing a residency at Massachusetts General Hospital, Majerus worked for the National Heart Institute, conducting research on fatty acid biosynthesis in E. coli in the laboratory of P. Roy Vagelos. Then he joined the Washington University School of Medicine faculty, shifting his research focus to hematology. Majerus said that the Vietnam War had pushed him toward a career in research; after his residency, he had the choice between going to war as a physician or working for the government in his research position.

Majerus studied the role of platelets in the clotting process, and he proved that low-dose aspirin therapy could reduce the incidence of heart attack and stroke. His work with clotting led to discoveries related to inositol, a substance that has importance in several bodily functions.

In 1987, he was elected a fellow of the American Association for the Advancement of Science. He was also awarded the Dameshek Prize from the American Society of Hematology.

== Later life ==
Majerus retired in 2014 and he died of prostate cancer in 2016. He had four children with his first wife, the former Janet Brakensiek. He was survived by his second wife, Dr. Elaine Flansburg Majerus.
