= Jeff Watkins =

Australian chemist and neuroscientist

Jeffrey Clifton Watkins
- Born: Perth, Australia
- Education: University of Western Australia (MSc); Cambridge University (PhD); Australian National University (Research fellowship)
- Known for: Discovery of the NMDA receptor
- Spouse: Beatrice
- Children: 2
- Scientific career
- Workplaces: University of Bristol

Jeffrey Clifton Watkins (1929–2023) was an Australian chemist and neuroscientist known for foundational research on excitatory amino acid (EAA) neurotransmission. He originally studied organic chemistry, and later became a professor at the University of Bristol where he combined synthetic chemistry with neuropharmacology. His work distinguished different glutamate-activated receptors and helped establish glutamate as a principal neurotransmitter in the central nervous system.

== Career ==
In the 1950s, Watkins worked with David Curtis, and others, to establish l-glutamate as the major excitatory neurotransmitter in the brain.

Watkins subsequently synthesised N-methyl-D-aspartate (NMDA) and related glutamate analogues and researched their interactions with nerve cell membranes, helping define that certain excitatory effects were mediated by discrete receptor sites. This work laid the foundation for later characterizing NMDA-selective receptors.

In 1973 he joined the School of Physiology, Pharmacology and Neuroscience at the University of Bristol, UK. Here he began collaboration with physiologist Richard H. Evans, combining chemistry with neurophysiology to investigate excitatory amino acid receptors and refine pharmacological tools.

Watkins was primarily responsible for the discovery of the NMDA receptor. He also identified Mg2+ as a potent and selective NMDA receptor antagonist.

In 1982, Watkins founded a chemical synthesis company, Tocris Neuramin. This company later grew into Tocris Bioscience, which won the Queen's Awards to Industry and became one of the largest distributors of fine chemicals to neuroscientists.
