= Burkhard Becher =

German immunologist, biomedical researcher

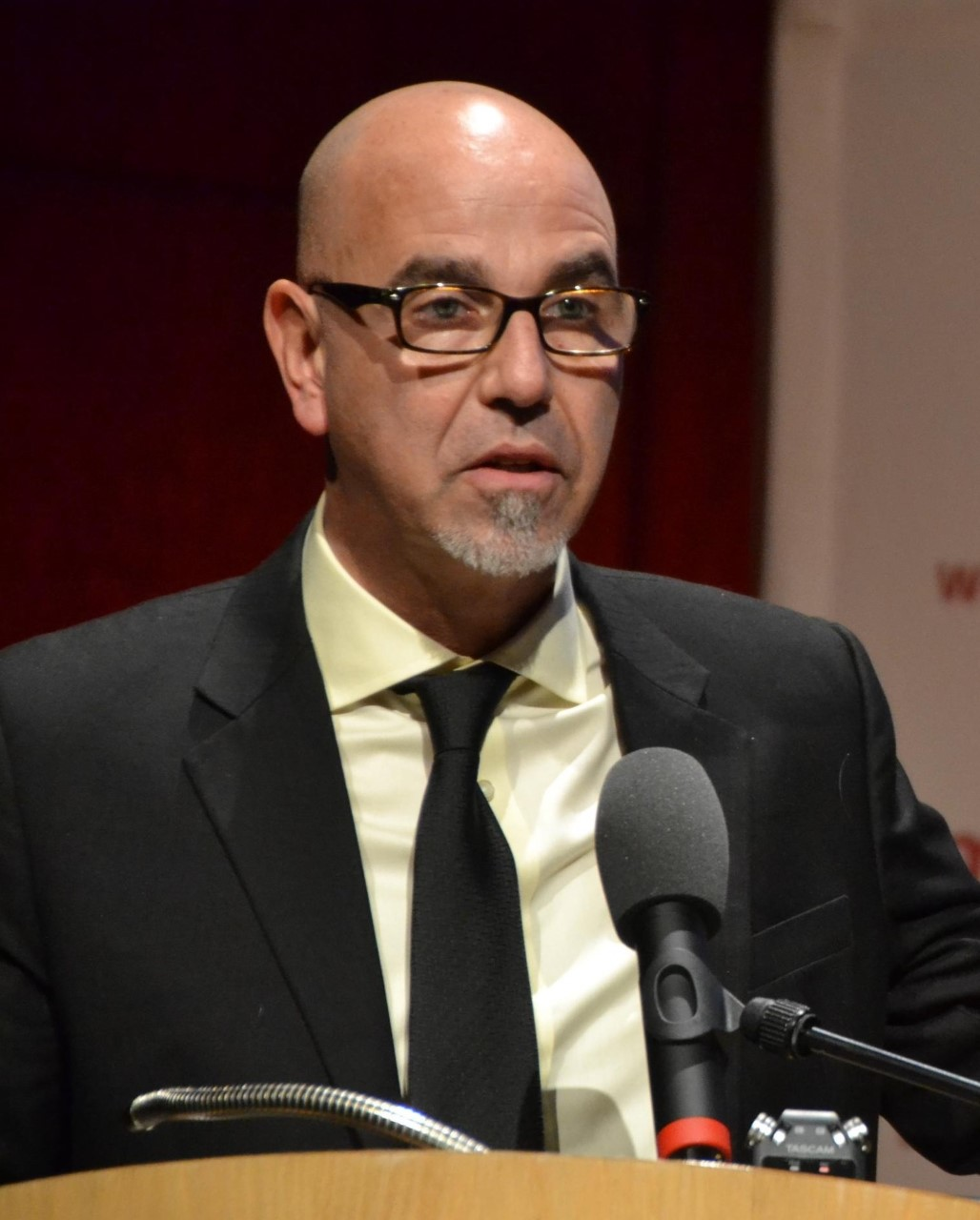
- Born: Cologne, Germany
- Occupations: Immunologist, biomedical researcher, and academic
- Awards: Théodore Ott Prize; Sobek Prize; Robert Bing Prize; Prof. Max Cloëtta Award; Harry Weaver Neuroscience Scholar, National Multiple Sclerosis Society

Academic background
- Education: Undergraduate in Biology; M.Sc., Biochemistry; Ph.D. (Dr.rer.nat.)
- Alma mater: University of Cologne, Germany; McGill University, Canada

Academic work
- Institutions: Dartmouth Medical School, Hanover, NH, USA; University of Zurich, Switzerland

Burkhard Becher is a German-Swiss immunologist and professor at the University of Zurich, where he serves as Chair of the Institute of Experimental Immunology. His research focuses on cytokine signalling networks that regulate communication between immune cells in inflammation, autoimmunity and cancer. He is known for work on IL-23 and GM-CSF in autoimmune inflammation and for applying high-dimensional single-cell immune profiling to human disease.

Becher's early work focused his research on the role of microglia cells as brain-resident myeloid cells capable of instructing self-reactive T cells in the context of autoimmune neuro-inflammation. His contributions for over the past 25 years to the field of Neuroinflammation have had implications toward understanding Neurodegeneration and tissue loss in Multiple Sclerosis, Alzheimer disease and brain cancer. He has received recognition for his research in the field, and has been awarded Théodore Ott Prize for Neuroscience (2022), The Sobek Price (2019), the Prof. Max Cloëtta Award, and Johann Anton Merck Award.

== Education ==
Becher attended the University of Cologne, from which he received his Bachelor's degree in Biology in 1992 and a Master's degree in Biochemistry in 1995. He then moved to Canada for his graduate studies in Neuroimmunology at the Montreal Neurological Institute at McGill University. From 1999 till 2002, he was a postdoctoral fellow at Dartmouth Medical School, Hanover.

== Career ==
Following his postdoctoral fellowship, Becher held a brief appointment as an assistant professor at Dartmouth Medical School. In 2003, he joined the University of Zurich (UZH) as assistant professor of neuroimmunology. In 2008 he was promoted to associate professor and chair of the Institute of Experimental Immunology. As of 2012, he serves as professor and chair of the Institute of Experimental Immunology at UZH, Switzerland.

He has served in international research evaluations, including as chair of the LS7 panel (“Prevention, Diagnosis and Treatment of Human Diseases”) for the 2025 European Research Council Consolidator Grant peer review process.

== Research ==
Becher trained with Jack Antel at the Montreal Neurological Institute where he developed numerous tools to manipulate microglial cells during inflammation. In 1999, he joined the lab of Randy Noelle at the Dartmouth Medical School to extend his work to in vivo models and transgenic mice. Later, he pioneered the high-dimensional analyses of the immune landscape in MS and cancer (humans and animal models), leading to the discovery of biomarkers that predict responses to immunotherapy. His main research focus in later work is to determine the implications of cytokines and how these molecules permit cell-cell communication between immune cells.

=== Immunology ===
Becher's early research is primarily focused on the role of antigen presenting cells in target recognition in the central nervous system in neuroinflammatory, and autoimmune disease. While using preclinical models of neuroinflammation as well as liquid biopsies of Multiple Sclerosis (MS) Patients, he has explored the implications of cytokines as initiators of disease development and immunopathology in MS and other chronic inflammatory diseases. He is also the one to discover the CNS harbours professional antigenpresenting cells that activate neuroantigen-specific T cells. In a series of papers published in 2019, he further solidified his discovery using novel tools for single cell analysis and conditional mutagenesis.

=== Cytokines ===
In 2002, Becher published an article in which he demonstrated for the first time that the formation of neuro-inflammation does not require the cytokine Interleukin 12. Instead the newly discovered cytokine Interleukin 23, as part of the IL-12 superfamily is required to initiate neuro-inflammation in preclinical models of MS. Interleukin 23 initiates a pathogenic program and the production of a unique cytokine profile in helper T cells. In 2011, Becher's team discovered that Interleukin 23 can initiate the production of GM-CSF in autoimmune T cells. This was one of several studies which solidified the role of cytokine GM-CSF as a fundamental communication conduit between neurotropic T lymphocytes and disease-causing phagocytes in preclinical models of Neuroinflammation. In his research, he also highlighted the significance of pathogenic T cells to produce GM-CSF, as a vital step for the initiation and maintenance of the inflammatory cascade, which leads to progressive immunopathology and irreversible tissue destruction in neuroinflammation as well as in graft-versus-host disease. He further found out that the dysregulation of GM-CSF in T cells of transgenic mice leads to fulminant and tissue specific neuroinflammation. In 2019, he explored the role of fate-mapping of GM-CSF expression in terms of identifying a discrete subset of inflammation-driving T helper cells regulated by cytokines IL-23 and IL-1β.

=== Technologies to study the immune landscape in neuroinflammation, ageing and brain cancer ===
Becher is among the pioneers to develop technology that can interrogate several hundred parameters on even small subpopulations of cells with exceedingly high-throughput at a reasonable cost. He is the first to analyze mononuclear and polymorphonucleated phagocytes using these technologies. In 2014, he conducted high-dimensional analysis of the murine myeloid cell system. This early single-cell immunophenotyping study of phagocytes across tissues revealed the complexity of myeloid cells and paved the way for ever more fine-grained interrogations of immune cells in health and disease.

Later on, with the help of single cell spectral analysis, Becher' research team demonstrated the practical applications of their technology in preclinical work, as well as to uncover biomarkers for clinical use in both neuroinflammation and brain cancer, and in the stratification of cancer patients undergoing immunotherapy. His team is also involved in the early adaptation of machine-learning techniques for data mining with a goal to understand the role of cytokine-dysregulation vs. TcR self-reactivity in chronic inflammatory disease in patients.

== Personal life ==
Becher is married to Marie Francoeur, and has two children, Belana and Benedict.

== Awards and honors ==
- 1999 - Fellowship Award National Multiple Sclerosis Society
- 2002 - Harry Weaver Neuroscience Scholar, National Multiple Sclerosis Society
- 2004 - Sobek Junior Research Award
- 2008 - Robert Bing Prize
- 2008 - Biogen Dompè MS-Research Prize
- 2010 - Prof. Max Cloëtta Award
- 2019 - Sobek Award for MS Research
- 2021 - Johann Anton Merck Award
- 2020 - ERC Advanced Grant
- 2022 - Théodore Ott Prize
- 2025 - ICIS–Pfizer Award for Excellence in Interferon and Cytokine Research

== Bibliography ==
- Codarri, L., Gyülvészi, G., Tosevski, V., Hesske, L., Fontana, A., Magnenat, L., ... & Becher, B. (2011). RORγt drives production of the cytokine GM-CSF in helper T cells, which is essential for the effector phase of autoimmune neuroinflammation. Nature immunology, 12(6), 560-567.
- Heppner, F. L., Ransohoff, R. M., & Becher, B. (2015). Immune attack: the role of inflammation in Alzheimer disease. Nature Reviews Neuroscience, 16(6), 358-372.
- Mrdjen, D., Pavlovic, A., Hartmann, F. J., Schreiner, B., Utz, S. G., Leung, B. P., ... & Becher, B. (2018). High-dimensional single-cell mapping of central nervous system immune cells reveals distinct myeloid subsets in health, aging, and disease. Immunity, 48(2), 380-395.
- Mundt, S., Mrdjen, D., Utz, S. G., Greter, M., Schreiner, B., & Becher, B. (2019). Conventional DCs sample and present myelin antigens in the healthy CNS and allow parenchymal T cell entry to initiate neuroinflammation. Science immunology, 4(31), eaau8380.
- Komuczki, J., Tuzlak, S., Friebel, E., Hartwig, T., Spath, S., Rosenstiel, P., ... & Becher, B. (2019). Fate-mapping of GM-CSF expression identifies a discrete subset of inflammation-driving T helper cells regulated by cytokines IL-23 and IL-1β. Immunity, 50(5), 1289-1304.
- Galli, E., Hartmann, F. J., Schreiner, B., Ingelfinger, F., Arvaniti, E., Diebold, M., ... & Becher, B. (2019). GM-CSF and CXCR4 define a T helper cell signature in multiple sclerosis. Nature medicine, 25(8), 1290-1300.
- Friebel, E., Kapolou, K., Unger, S., Núñez, N. G., Utz, S., Rushing, E. J., ... & Becher, B. (2020). Single-cell mapping of human brain cancer reveals tumor-specific instruction of tissue-invading leukocytes. Cell, 181(7), 1626-1642.
- Ingelfinger, F., Gerdes, L. A., Kavaka, V., Krishnarajah, S., Friebel, E., Galli, E., ... & Becher, B. (2022). Twin study reveals non-heritable immune perturbations in multiple sclerosis. Nature, 603(7899), 152-158.
