= Dominique de Quervain =

Swiss neuroscientist

- Born: December 8, 1968 (age 57); Bern, Switzerland

Dominique de Quervain (born December 8, 1968) is a Swiss neuroscientist. He is professor of neuroscience and director of the Division of Cognitive Neuroscience at the University of Basel, Switzerland. He is known for his pioneering research into the use of glucocorticoids (cortisol) in the treatment of PTSD and phobias. He is understood to have found a link between cortisol and forgetting, specifically that cortisol can inhibit memory retrieval. Furthermore, he is known for his contributions to the field of genetics of human memory.

== Career ==
After receiving his MD from University of Bern in 1998, de Quervain has worked at University of California Irvine, University Psychiatric Clinic Basel, and University of Zürich. Since 2009, he has worked at the University of Basel where he currently serves as director of the division of cognitive neuroscience.

== Glucocorticoids and memory ==
de Quervain's work with glucocorticoids, mainly cortisol, and memory dates back to 1998 after he found that glucocorticoids cause an impairment in memory retrieval in animals. He has since applied his findings about glucocorticoids to fear memory related to phobias, PTSD, and addiction memory. Memory retrieval, especially retrieval of emotional memories, is impaired when healthy subjects are given doses of cortisol. Whereas cortisol impairs memory retrieval, cortisol enhances memory consolidation when moving emotional memories to long term memory. In phobia patients, cortisol can be administered before a fearful stimuli is presented, halting the retrieval of fear memories. Memory consolidation of the corrective experience is enhanced, facilitating fear extinction. If this procedure is repeated over time, the fear memory eventually gets weaker.

=== Phobias ===
Glucocorticoids decrease fear in patients with phobias. When given a dosage of cortisol, patients with social phobia showed reduced fear when given a social stress test. Patients with spider phobia showed less aversion to spider photographs when given cortisol. This fear-reducing effect of cortisol was also observed when combined with psychotherapy: In a study exposing people with fear of heights to a virtual simulation of heights, de Quervain found a 60% drop in fear if people were given cortisol beforehand as compared to a 40% drop after placebo. By reducing the retrieval of fearful memories, glucocorticoids can eventually cause these fearful memories to become extinct. Glucocorticoids, however, have not been found to reduce general fear or anxiety in otherwise healthy people.

=== PTSD ===
When cortisol was given to PTSD patients, they reported fewer recollections of traumatic memories and symptoms related to PTSD such as flashbacks or nightmares. Even after the cortisol doses ended, occurrence of recollections and nightmares remained low showing that cortisol seemingly ceased the reconsolidation process that keeps traumatic memories vivid. When combined with behavioral therapy, cortisol shows great promise in treating PTSD.

=== Addiction ===
Memory plays an important role in addiction as it stores the powerful incentives associated with drug taking that produce a strong feeling of craving. Therefore, administration of cortisol could result in reduced retrieval of addiction memory and, thereby, reduce feelings of craving. In 2015, a study by de Quervain has shown that, when given cortisol, heroin addicts reported reduced heroin cravings.

== Genetics of memory ==
Memory-enhancement of emotional events depend on noradrenergic transmission. In 2007, de Quervain has shown that a deletion variant of the alpha2b-adrenoceptor is related to enhanced emotional memory in Europeans and Africans. Furthermore, using genome mapping, de Quervain has found that the receptor HRH1 can be targeted with drugs to hamper memory. When HRH1 was targeted with drugs, a single administration of the drug decreased recall of aversive memories but had no effect on neutral or positive memories. This approach can be used to develop medications to enhance memory recall or reduce the retrieval traumatic memories in PTSD patients. de Quervain has also found a genetic link between HSD11B1 and the risk for developing Alzheimer's.

== Awards ==
In 2006, de Quervain received the Pfizer-Prize in Neuroscience, in 2007 the Robert-Bing Prize of the Swiss Academy of Medical Sciences, and in 2010 he has been elected a Fellow of the Association for Psychological Science. He, along with Andreas Papassotiropoulos, was awarded the Cloëtta Prize in 2013.
