= Nature Medicine =

- Discipline: Medicine
- Language: English
- Edited by: João Monteiro

Publication details
- History: 1995–present
- Publisher: Nature Publishing Group
- Frequency: Monthly
- Impact factor: 52.5 (2025)

Standard abbreviations
- ISO 4: Nat. Med.

Indexing
- CODEN: NAMEFI
- ISSN: 1078-8956 (print); 1546-170X (web)
- LCCN: 95660642
- OCLC no.: 471508019

Links
- Journal homepage; Online archive

Nature Medicine is a monthly peer-reviewed medical journal published by Nature Portfolio covering all aspects of medicine. It was established in 1995. The journal seeks to publish research papers that "demonstrate novel insight into disease processes, with direct evidence of the physiological relevance of the results". Nature Medicine also publishes reviews, perspectives and other content commissioned from leading scientists in their fields. As with other Nature journals, there is no external editorial board, with editorial decisions being made by an in-house team, although peer review by external expert referees forms a part of the review process. The editor-in-chief is João Monteiro.

According to the Journal Citation Reports, the journal has a 2025 impact factor of 52.5, ranking it 1st out of 259 journals in the category "Biochemistry & Molecular Biology". The table below provides a detailed overview of recent bibliometric indicators for Nature Medicine:

Bibliometric rankings for Nature Medicine (2023)
Source	Category	Rank	Percentile	Quartile
Scopus	General medicine (Medicine)	3/636	99.53	Q1
Scopus	General biochemistry, genetics and molecular biology (Biochemistry, genetics and molecular biology)	2/221	99.10	Q1
IF (Web of Science)	Biochemistry & molecular biology	1/313	99.80	Q1
IF (Web of Science)	Cell biology	2/205	99.30	Q1
IF (Web of Science)	Medicine, research & experimental	1/189	99.70	Q1
JCI (Web of Science)	Biochemistry & molecular biology	1/313	99.68	Q1
JCI (Web of Science)	Cell biology	1/205	99.51	Q1
JCI (Web of Science)	Medicine, research & experimental	1/189	99.47	Q1

== Abstracting and indexing ==
Nature Medicine is abstracted and indexed in:

- Science Citation Index Expanded
- Web of Science
- Scopus
- UGC

== List of current editors ==
The current team of editors working on Nature Medicine are:

- João Monteiro (Chief Editor)
- Saheli Sadanand (Deputy Editor)
- Liam Messin (Deputy Editor)
- Sarah Tomlin (Senior Editor)
- Karen O'Leary (Senior Editor, Research Analysis)
- Michael Basson (Senior Editor, Research)
- Ashley Castellanos-Jankiewicz (Senior Editor, Research)
- Jerome Staal (Senior Editor, Research)
- Ulrike Harjes (Senior Editor, Research)
- Anna Ranzoni (Senior Editor, Research)
- Lorenzo Righetto (Senior Editor, Research)
- Ming Yang (Senior Editor, Research)
- Lia Parkin (Associate Editor, Research)
- Mattia Andreoletti (Associate Editor, Research)
