= Burkhart =

Burkhart is a German language surname. Notable people with the surname include:

- Blakesley Burkhart, astrophysicist
- Byron Burkhart, Osage man murdered in the Osage Indian murders
- Charles Burkhart (born 1928), American musicologist, theorist, composer, and pianist
- Donald Burkhart (born 1948), American politician
- Ernest Burkhart (1892–1986), American murderer
- Emerson Burkhart (1905–1969), American artist
- Harry Burkhart, criminal
- Imogene Audette Burkhart (1925–2006), American film, television, and stage actress
- Jeff Burkhart, American politician
- Jessica Burkhart (born 1987), American author
- Julie Burkhart, American operator
- Karl Burkhart (1908–1976), Swiss cyclist
- Katie Burkhart (born 1986), American, former collegiate All-American
- Kathe Burkhart (born 1958), American interdisciplinary artist, painter, writer, and art critic
- Ken Burkhart (1916–2004), American right-handed pitcher
- Kyle Burkhart (born 1986), American former football tackle
- Lillian Burkhart Goldsmith (1871–1958), American vaudeville performer, clubwoman, and businesswoman
- Louise Burkhart (born 1958), American academic ethnohistorian and anthropologist
- Lukas Burkhart (born 1991), Swiss professional squash player
- Melvin Burkhart (1907–2001), sideshow performer
- Mollie Burkhart (1886–1937), Osage woman known for surviving the Osage Indian murders
- Morgan Burkhart (born 1972), American baseball player
- Stella May McCutcheon Burkhart Alexander (1881–1960), American politician
- Summers Burkhart (1859–1932), American lawyer
- Taylor Burkhart (born 2002), American artistic gymnast
- Timothy Burkhart (1966–2001), American serial killer

== Fictional ==
- Jackie Burkhart, fictional That '70s Show character

== See also ==
- Burkhart Waldecker (1902–1964), German explorer
- Burkhart-Dibrell House, a historic house at 500 Main Street in Ketchikan, Alaska
- Birkerts, Borchert, Borgert, Borgerth, Burchard, Burgard, Burgert, Burghardt, Burkard, Burkardt, Burkart, Burkert, Burkhard (given name), Burkhard (surname), Burkhardt, Burghardt, Burkhead
