= Burckhardt (surname) =

Burckhardt is a German-language surname. Notable people with the surname include:

== Members of the Swiss patrician family from Basel ==
- Johann Bernhard Burckhardt (1645–1740), Swiss politician and military officer
- Christoph Burckhardt (1740–1812), a Swiss merchant involved in international trade and slave trade
- Jacob Burckhardt (1818–1897), Swiss historian of art and culture, author of "The Culture of the Renaissance"
- Johann Ludwig Burckhardt (1784–1817), Swiss traveler and orientalist who re-discovered the ancient city of Petra
- Carl Jacob Burckhardt, diplomat and President of the Red Cross
- Karl Burckhardt (1830–1893), Swiss politician
- Johann Gottlieb Burckhardt (1836–1907), Swiss psychiatrist and founder of modern psychosurgery
- Charlotte Louise Burckhardt (1862–1892), daughter of a Swiss merchant from Basel
- Titus Burckhardt (1908–1984), Swiss author and member of the Traditionalist School
- Rudy Burckhardt (1914–1999), Swiss-American filmmaker and photographer
- Martin Burckhardt (1921–2007), Swiss architect, politician, and patron of the arts
- Tom Burckhardt (born 1964), American artist

== Others ==
- Carl Nathanael Burckhardt (1878–1923), Swiss painter and sculptor
- Elsa Burckhardt-Blum (1900–1974), Swiss architect and painter
- Fabian Burckhardt, Swiss curler
- Friedrich-Karl Burckhardt, World War I flying ace
- Heinrich Christian Burckhardt (1811–1879), German forester and entomologist
- Hubertus Meyer-Burckhardt (born 1956), German author, television presenter, and talkshow host
- Jenny Burckhardt (1849–1935), Swiss painter
- Johann Karl Burckhardt (1773–1825), German-born astronomer and mathematician
- Johann Jakob Burckhardt (1903–2006), Swiss mathematician and crystallographer
- Johannes Burckhardt (1853–1914), German Protestant minister
- Louise Bachofen-Burckhardt (1845–1920), Swiss philanthropist
- Lucius Burckhardt (1925–2003), Swiss sociologist and economist
- Lutz-Wilhelm Burckhardt (1919–1993), German Luftwaffe military aviator during World War II
- Marc Burckhardt, American fine artist and illustrator
- Martin Burckhardt (born 1957), German author and cultural theorist
- Ute Trekel-Burckhardt (born 1939), German operatic mezzo-soprano
- Walter Burckhardt (1905–1971), Swiss dermatologist
- William Burckhardt Barker (1810?–1856), English orientalist

== See also ==
- Burckhardt Helferich (1887–1982), German chemist
- Burckhardt Hoppe (born 1946), German former sports shooter
- Burchard (name)
- Burkhardt
- Burghardt
