= Burkart =

Burkart is a German language surname. Notable people with the surname include:

- Aaron Burkart (born 1982), German rally driver
- Céline Burkart (born 1995), Swiss badminton player
- Claudia Burkart (born 1980), Argentine field hockey player
- Elmer Burkart (1917–1995), American baseball player
- Erika Burkart (1922–2010), Swiss writer, teacher, and poet
- Helen Barnett-Burkart (born 1958), British sprinter
- Jeanette Arocho-Burkart, American army sergeant
- Nishan Burkart (born 2000), Swiss footballer
- Stefan Burkart (1957–2020), Swiss sprinter
- Thierry Burkart (born 1975), Swiss politician
- Urs Burkart (born 1963), Swiss ice hockey player
- Will Burkart, American comedian

== See also ==
- Burchard (name)
- Burkhart
- Burkhardt (surname)
- Burghardt
