= Burkard (surname) =

Burkard is a German language surname. Notable people with the surname include:

- Alfredo Cristiani Burkard (born 1947), Salvadoran politician
- August Burkard (1894–?), German flying ace
- Bob Burkard (1922–1992), American soccer goalkeeper
- Chris Burkard (born 1986), American photographer
- Christoph Burkard (born 1983), German retired Paralympic swimmer
- Elena Burkard (born 1992), German long-distance runner
- Franz Burkard, several people
- Guido Burkard, Swiss physicist
- Katja Burkard (born 1965), German television presenter
- Jerome Burkard (born 2002), Dominican footballer
- Marianne Carbonnier-Burkard (born 1949), French historian
- Michael Burkard (1947–2024), American poet and educator
- Oscar Burkard (1877–1950), German-American soldier
- Rainer Burkard (born 1943), Austrian mathematician
- Roman Burkard (born 1940), Swiss sports shooter
- Stephen F. Burkard (born 1897), New York state senator

== See also ==
- Burkard (given name)
- Burchard (name)
- Burkhardt
- Burghardt
