= Burchardt =

Burchardt is a German language surname. Notable people with the surname include:

- Brigitte Burchardt (born 1954), German chess player
- Hans Burchardt (1904–1992), American woodcarver
- Hans-Jürgen Burchardt, German economist and social scientist
- Hermann Burchardt (1857–1909), German explorer and photographer
- Regina Burchardt (born 1983), German volleyball player
- Ulla Burchardt (born 1954), German politician

== See also ==
- Burghardt
- Burkhardt (surname)
- Burchard (name)
