= Burgard =

Burgard is a German language surname. Notable people with the surname include:

- Raymond Burgard (1892–1944), French Resistance worker
- Willi Burgard (1927–2000), German athlete
- Wolfram Burgard (born 1961), German roboticist

== See also ==
- Burgard Vocational High School, a vocational high school located in Buffalo, New York, USA
- Burchard (name)
- Burkhart
- Burkhardt (surname)
- Burghardt
