= Burgert =

Burgert is a German language surname. Notable people with the surname include:

- Burgert Brothers, early photographers
- Edward Burgert (1887–1968), Benedictine monk
- Hans-Joachim Burgert (1928–2009), German calligrapher, sculptor, and educator
- Ingo Burgert (born 1968), German-Swiss wood scientist and professor
- Jonas Burgert, German artist

== See also ==
- Burchard (name)
- Burkhart
- Burkhardt (surname)
- Burghardt
