= Purkert =

Purkert is a surname. It may be a Czech variant of Burkhart.

- Ben Purkert, American poet and novelist
- Walter Purkert, German mathematician and math historian
