= Bouchard =

Bouchard, a Norman name with German elements, means "fort" (bourgh) and "brave," "strong" (heard), see Burkhardt. It is also a French nickname for someone with a big mouth, "bouche" being French for mouth. Notable people with the name include:

- Several princes of Vendôme; see List of counts and dukes of Vendôme
- Alain Bouchard (born 1949), Canadian businessman
- Albert Bouchard (born 1947), American musician, a member of the band Blue Öyster Cult
- Anthony Bouchard, American politician
- Benoît Bouchard (born 1940), Canadian politician
- Cal Bouchard (born 1977), Canadian former basketball player
- Camil Bouchard (born 1945), Canadian politician
- Candace Bouchard, American politician
- Charles Bouchard (born 1956), Royal Canadian Air Force general
- Charles Jacques Bouchard (1837–1915), French pathologist
- Claude Bouchard (born 1939), Canadian physiologist
- Dan Bouchard (born 1950), Canadian hockey player
- David Bouchard, Canadian author
- Eli Bouchard (born 2007), Canadian snowboarder
- Elias Bouchard, fictional character in the horror fiction podcast The Magnus Archives
- Émile Bouchard (1919–2012), Canadian hockey player
- Eugenie Bouchard (born 1994), Canadian tennis and pickleball player
- Evan Bouchard (born 1999), Canadian hockey player
- Gérard Bouchard (born 1943), Canadian historian, sociologist and writer
- Gilles Bouchard (born 1971), Canadian ice hockey coach
- Gwendolyn Bouchard, fictional character in the horror fiction podcast The Magnus Protocol
- Henri Bouchard (1875–1960), French sculptor
- Hippolyte Bouchard (1780–1843), French and Argentine sailor and corsair
- Jacinthe Bouchard, Canadian animal behaviorist and trainer
- Jeanne-d'Arc Bouchard (born 1929), Canadian nun and nurse
- Joe Bouchard (born 1948), American musician, a member of the band Blue Öyster Cult
- Joel Bouchard (born 1974), Canadian ice hockey player
- Ken Bouchard (born 1955), American NASCAR driver
- Loren Bouchard (born 1969), American cartoonist, animator, voice actor, screenwriter, producer, director, and composer
- Lucien Bouchard (born 1938), Canadian politician
- Marie Rosalie Bouchard (1862–1936), French journalist, editor and activist
- Michel Marc Bouchard (born 1958), Canadian playwright
- Mike Bouchard (born 1956), American politician
- Pierre-François Bouchard (1772–1832), French captain
- Pierre-Marc Bouchard (born 1984), Canadian hockey player
- Raymond Bouchard (1945–2026), Canadian actor
- Robert Bouchard (born 1943), Canadian politician
- Sean Bouchard (born 1996), American baseball player
- Simone Mary Bouchard (1912–1945), Canadian painter and textile artist
- Télesphore-Damien Bouchard (1881–1962), Canadian politician
- Thomas J. Bouchard (born 1937), American psychologist

== See also ==
- Bouchard Père et Fils, a Burgundy wine producer
- Bouchard River, a tributary of the Franquelin River in Franquelin, Quebec, Canada
- Bouchard Tower, a 30-story high skyscraper in Buenos Aires, Argentina
- Burchard (name)
- Burgheard (disambiguation)
