= Burkard (given name) =

Burkard is a German language given surname. Notable people with the surname include:

- Burkard Eble (1799–1839), Austrian physician, ophthalmologist, librarian, medical historian, and writer
- Burkard Freiherr von Müllenheim-Rechberg (1910—2003), German diplomat
- Burkard Hillebrands (born 1957), German physicist
- Burkard Huwiler (1868–1954), Swiss Roman Catholic bishop
- Burkard Polster (born 1965), German mathematician
- Burkard Schliessmann, German classical pianist and concert artist
- Burkard Wilhelm Leist (1819–1906), German jurist

== See also ==
- Burkards Dzenis (1879–1966), Latvian artist
- Burkard (surname)
- Burkhard (given name)
- Burchard (name)
