= Franz Burkard =

Franz Burkard may refer to:

- Franz Burkard (died 1539), Canon lawyer
- Franz Burkard (died 1584), Canon lawyer
