= Birkerts =

Birkerts is a surname. It may be a Latvianized form of the German surname Birkert, a phonetic variant of Bürkert/Burkert. Notable people with the surname include:

- Gunnar Birkerts, American architect
- Sven Birkerts, American academic and writer
