= Borchert =

Borchert is a German language surname. It stems from the male given name Burchard – and may refer to:

- Bernhard Borchert (1863–1945), Baltic-German painter
- Jochen Borchert (1940), German politician
- Jürgen Borchert (1940–2000), German judge
- Karl Borchert (1884), German gymnast
- Katharina Borchert (1972), German journalist
- Reinhard Borchert (1948), German sprinter
- Rudolph Borchert (1928–2003), American screenwriter
- Scott Borchert, American writer
- William G. Borchert (1933–2022), American screenwriter and author
- Wolfgang Borchert (1921–1947), German author and playwright
