= BIS Tower =

High-rise in Basel, Switzerland

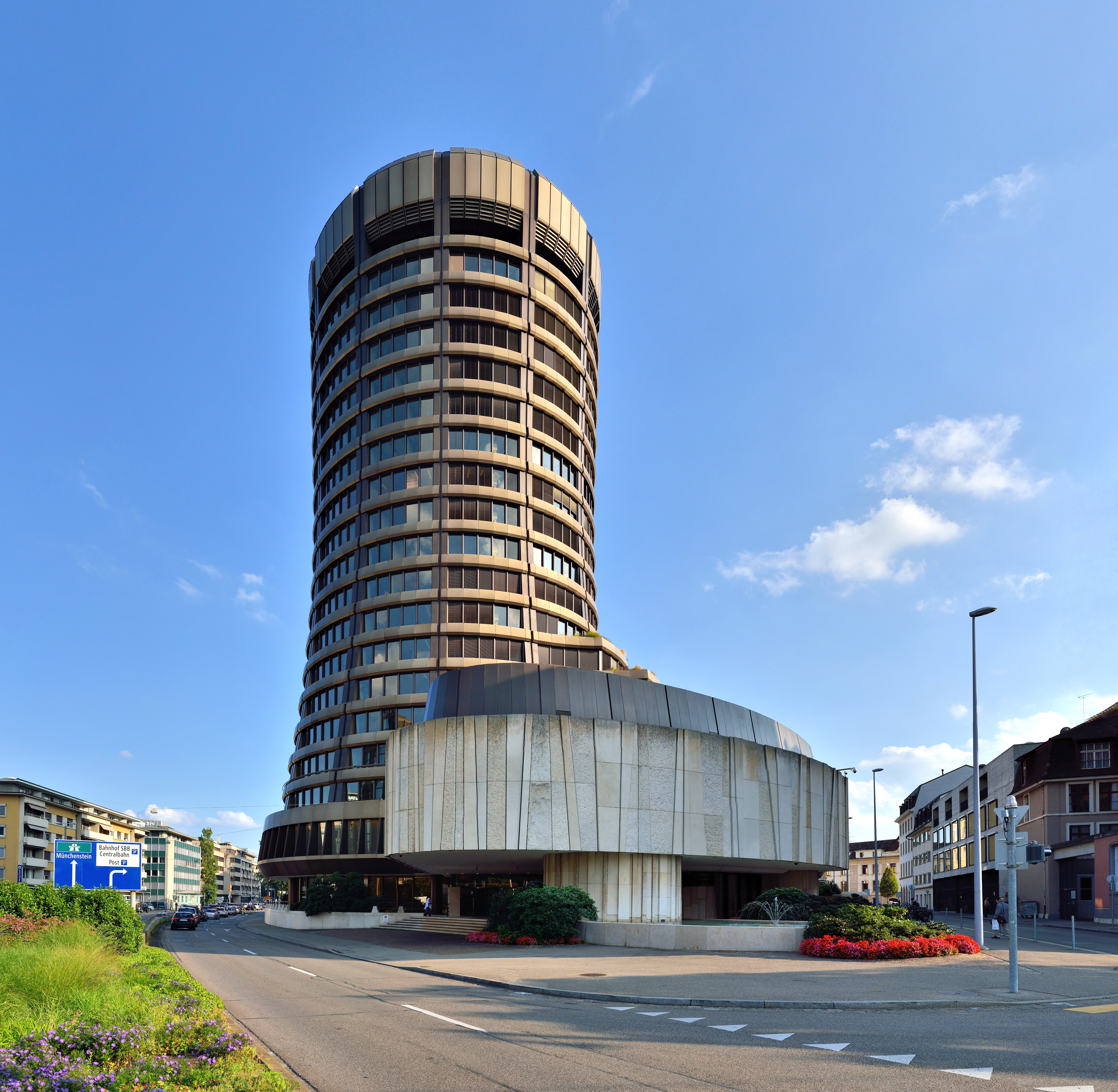
- BIS Tower from the northwest with the base building housing the auditorium in the foreground
- Interactive map of the BIS Tower area

General information
- Status: Completed
- Type: Administrative building
- Architectural style: Modernism
- Location: Central Railway Station 2, Basel, Basel, Switzerland
- Coordinates: 47°32′53.05″N 7°35′30.37″E
- Construction started: 1972
- Construction stopped: 1977
- Opened: May 9, 1977
- Owner: BIS

Height
- Height: 69,5

Technical details
- Material: Steel, Reinforced concrete
- Floor count: 20
- Grounds: 30'000 m²

Design and construction
- Architect: Martin Burckhardt (Architekt)
- Architecture firm: Burckhardt and Partner Ltd.

Other information
- Number of rooms: around 600

The BIS Tower, also known as the BIS high-rise (German: BIZ-Hochhaus), is a 69.5-meter-high administrative tower and headquarters of the Bank for International Settlements (BIS) in Basel, Switzerland. Designed by architect Martin Burckhardt and built between 1972 and 1977, the tower is a landmark of the Central Railway Station and the city of Basel. From the year of its construction until 2003, it was the third tallest building in the city. The BIS Tower dominates the Basel skyline with its striking silhouette, and its color scheme and aesthetics set the style for several commercial and administrative buildings in the 1970s.

By a special agreement and international conventions, the building has a special legal status (Art. 3 Agreement of February 10, 1987). In addition to its function as administrative headquarters, the building is regularly used by the BIS for international meetings and conferences.

== Function and special status ==
The BIS Tower is primarily used by BIS as its administration and headquarters. Together with the Botta building on Aeschenplatz, it houses around 600 workplaces. The BIS archive in the basement is listed as a cultural asset of national importance by the Canton of Basel City.

In addition, the BIS Tower is a regular venue for bi-monthly meetings of policymakers from the IMF and national central banks. This informal exchange - known as the Basel Process - is designed to foster cooperation among central banks and other bodies and is considered a key pillar of the international financial stability debate. Within this framework, more than 5,000 participants meet annually at events organized by the BIS. These include international committees and standard-setting bodies such as the Basel Committee on Banking Supervision, known for its Basel III regulations.

Similar to the United Nations, the IRCRCM, or the IMF, the BIS has a special status. Employees in the financial sector are granted immunity and may not be searched. The building and all its parts also play a special role. The building and grounds are treated similarly to an embassy and are invulnerable (Swiss usage) or inviolable (German usage). It is part of Swiss territory, but national sovereignty can only be enforced to a limited extent.

Swiss authorities have access only if the President or CEO of the BIS grants permission and waives the principle of territorial inviolability. This circumstance is often colloquially referred to in the press as extraterritorial status, which is somewhat simplified but not entirely legally correct. This special status is governed by an agreement, which entered into force on January 1, 1987, between the BIS and the Swiss Federal Council. The agreement has its origins in an agreement concluded at the Hague Conference on January 20, 1930. Access by Swiss authorities, including the police, requires the authorization of the President or General Manager of the BIS.

== History ==
=== Previous history ===
When the BIS was founded in January 1930, Basel was chosen as its headquarters. For two years, the organization rented the Grand Hôtel et Savoy Hôtel Univers on Basel's Central Railway Station Square for its events and meetings. This temporary location, first rented and then purchased in 1949, remained in use until the 1970s.

Between 1954 and 1966, the increasing need for space led the architect Martin Burckhardt to draw up a series of building projects that could be realized on the 3300-square-meter site owned by the bank. It turned out that the project could not meet the requirements on this basis. For this reason, between 1966 and 1972, BIS gradually acquired the 7500-square-meter site near the train station where its current headquarters are located. In 1969, Martin Burckhardt submitted three designs for this new site. Initially, the BIS Board of Directors opted for an 82-meter-high cylindrical tower with 24 floors. Following objections from the Basel Heritage Society that the height of the building would interfere with the historic silhouette of the city, the original design - the so-called vegetative design - was reduced to 69.5 meters and 20 floors. In contrast to the original proposal, the model showed a "waisted" cylinder with a capacity for 300 employees.

=== Construction ===
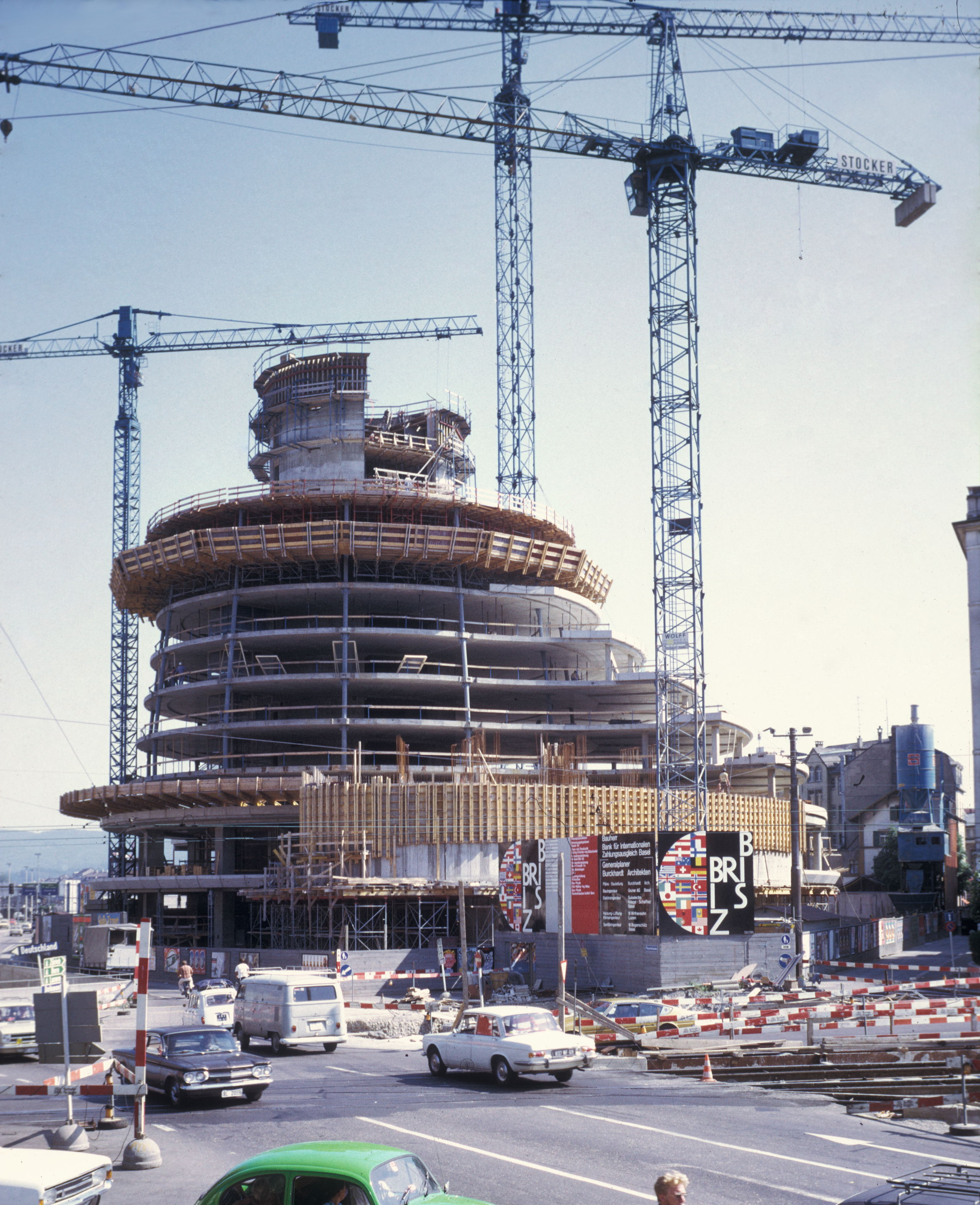
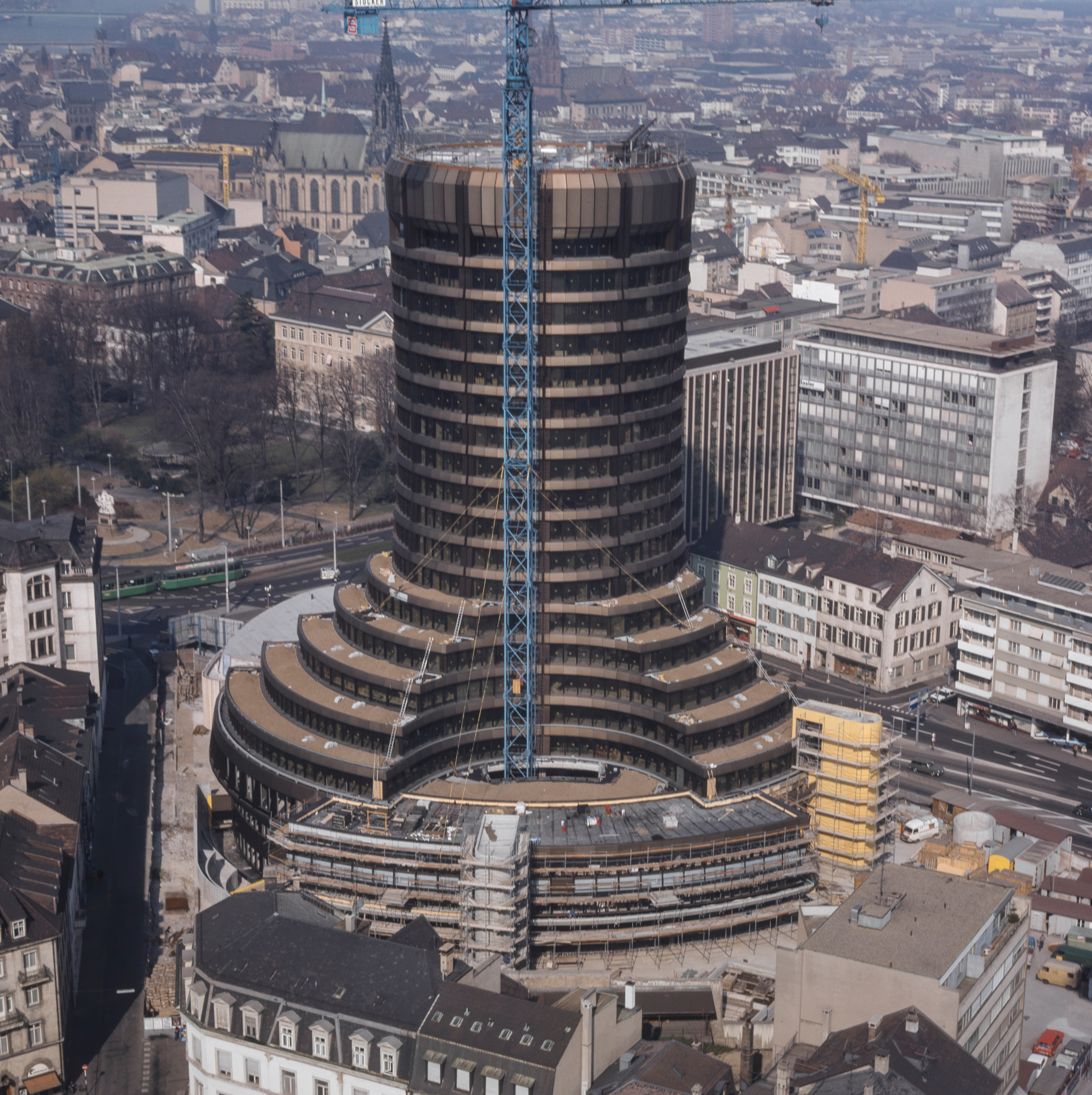
BIS tower during the construction phase, left: around 1975, right: March 1976

The design was approved by 69% of the population in a referendum, and construction began in 1972. An excavation up to 15 meters deep was dug for the skyscraper's foundation. The foundation stone was laid on May 14, 1973.

The subsoil in the Rhine gravel consisted of gravel-sand material. The excavation pit was closed vertically with underpinning elements and reinforced with alluvial anchors. The water table was 2 to 3 meters below the bottom of the excavation; 4 to 9 meters below was the surface of the Cyrenian marl. The surveying work, divided into four phases, was used to stake out the first-floor level, the building structure, and the work inside the building. The measurements were made with precision theodolites and the forward section method. Up to the fourth floor, high targets were attached to the roof parapets of the surrounding buildings; from the fifth floor onwards, fixed points were set inside the circular building. When the core was completed at a height of 69 meters on the top floor, the control measurement showed a deviation within the tolerance limit of ± 2 millimeters. The topping-out ceremony for the BIS Tower was held on April 25, 1975.

After completion of the interior work, business began on March 21, 1977, and the first meeting of the board of directors was held on April 19. The official inauguration took place on May 9 of that year. At the time of its construction, the BIS Tower was the third-tallest building in the city and the tallest in the downtown area.

=== Since construction ===
In 1997, in response to the expansion of its activities and the associated increase in staffing requirements, BIS launched an international architectural competition for the redesign of its administration tower. The competition was won by the Japanese architect Toyo Ito and his office, whose design called for two towers. However, the redesign was never realized. Instead, in May 1998, BIS acquired a building designed by Mario Botta on Basel's Aeschenplatz, which was originally occupied by UBS. This modern building, with six floors above ground and six below, and the adjoining neo-baroque villa were extensively renovated by BIS for its use. Since 1999, it has been used as a second building, housing the banking, risk control, and IT departments.

Since the opening of the BIS Tower, the number of meetings has increased to 300 and the number of participants to 9,000 per year, as needs staff, so that since 2014 the BIS has been evaluating additional expansion options. To this end, the BIS has applied to the canton for a zoning change for the area immediately south of the current tower for further expansion. The plan is to add a multi-story building to the base of the BIS Tower. In 2014, Herzog & de Meuron accompanied the construction plans. However, construction was not to begin until 2020, and the actual design was to be decided by an architectural competition. The current gross floor area of 30,000 square meters was to be increased to 68,000 square meters.

In mid-December 2022, it was announced that BIS was planning a new 107-metre-high building next to the BIS Tower to complement the existing BIS Tower for reasons of space. The designs for this high rise were drawn up by the architects Elemental from Santiago de Chile in collaboration with Nissen Wentzlaff from Basel. Their design was the unanimous winner of the architectural competition held in June 2021, in which eleven companies took part.

== Description ==
=== Location and surrounding area ===
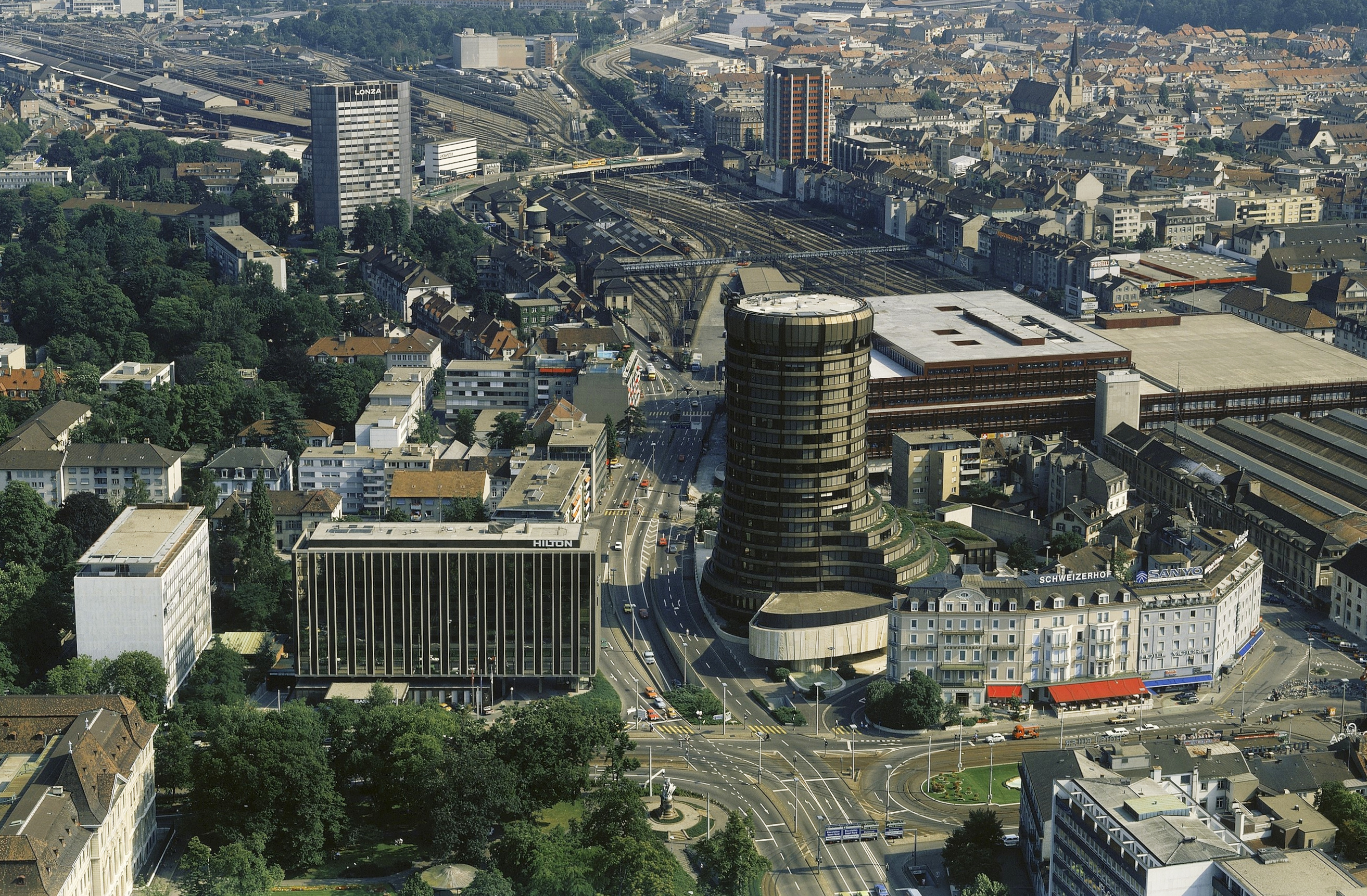
Aerial view from the north-west (1978) with the BIS tower, Nauenstrasse, and the Lonza high-rise building in the background on the left

The BIS Tower is located on the northeastern edge of Central Railway Square, a central transportation hub in Basel; the Basel SBB railway station is on its south side. The building stands on a square plot of land bordered by Heumattenstrasse to the west, Centralbahnstrasse to the south, and Gartenstrasse to the east. The entire site is owned by the BIS. The multi-lane Nauenstrasse to the north is a busy west–east axis within the city. The ramp of the eastern portal to the Nauen tunnel is located at the level of the BIS tower, which allows the central section of Nauenstrasse to run underground. With five trams in Basel, the BIS is also located at a public transportation hub.

Near the BIS Tower are the Post 2, Hotel Schweizerhof, the administrative building of Basel Insurance, and, opposite the crossroads, the Strassburger Memorial and the Elisabeth Park. In 2020, Baloise Park with the 89-metre-high Baloise Tower was built to the north of the BIS Tower on the site of the Hotel Hilton, which was demolished in 2016.

=== Architecture and construction technology ===
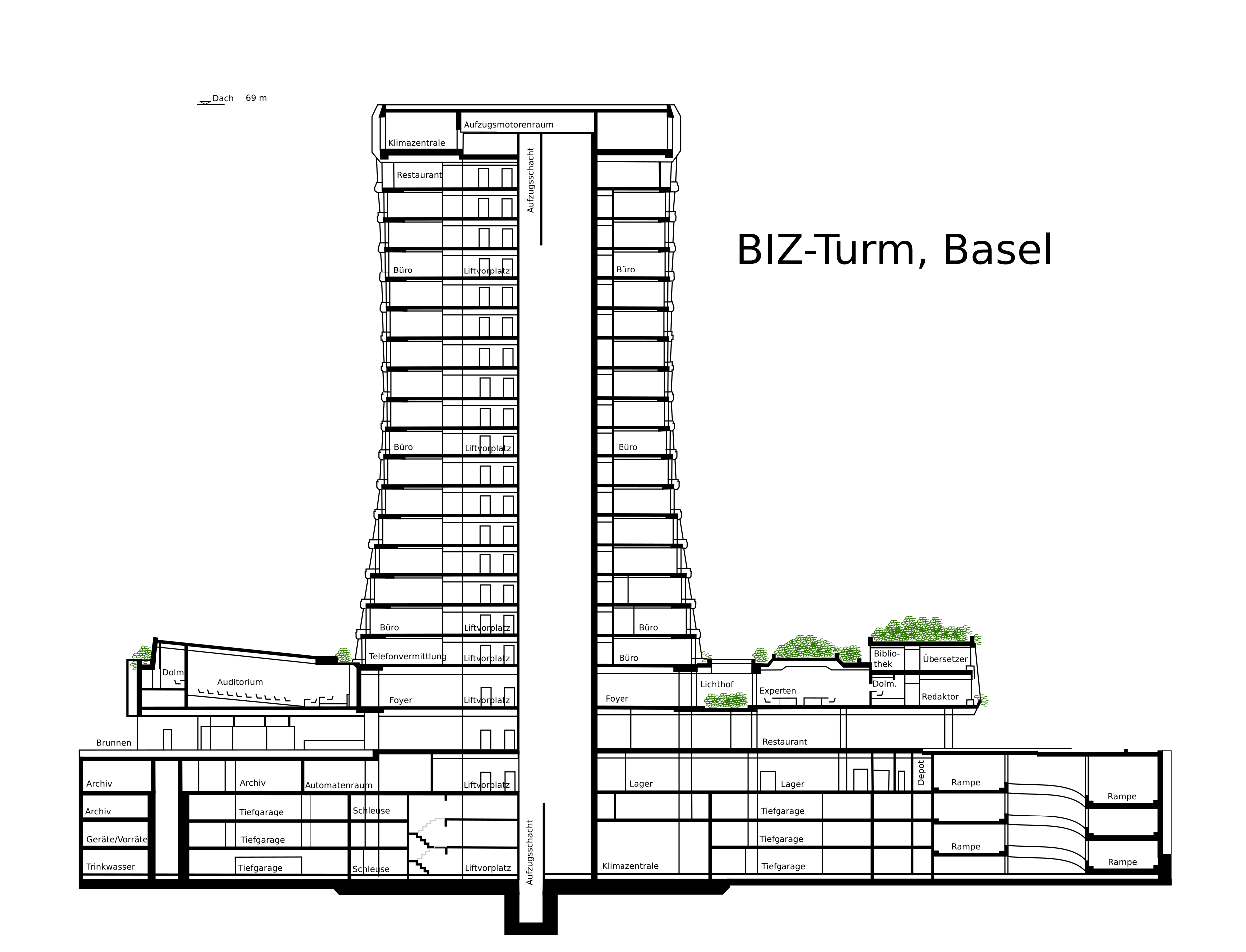
Sectional view (northwest–southeast direction) through the cylindrical core of the BIS tower

The 69.5-meter-high rotunda-shaped administration and conference building has its main entrance at the corner of Nauenstrasse and Heumattstrasse. The building, with its concave lines, has a ground floor and 19 upper floors, as well as four basement floors, which contain an underground garage for around 300 cars, workshops, archive rooms, rooms for technical equipment, an air-raid shelter, and an infirmary. On the lower floors, the circular floor plan of the building has a diameter of about 30 meters.

The circular floors have a cylindrical core as a service shaft, which houses, among other things, the elevator systems. The copper-colored façade consists of a hyperboloid shell of twelve load-bearing steel columns and uniformly inserted glazed metal elements. Each floor consists of 72 facade elements made of polished and anodized aluminum using the Colinal process. Of these, 60 elements are permanently glazed and twelve are designed as solid elements behind which the main load-bearing columns are concealed. The steel parts are hot-dip and spray-painted and the glazing is solar control glass. Two external systems are available for façade maintenance.

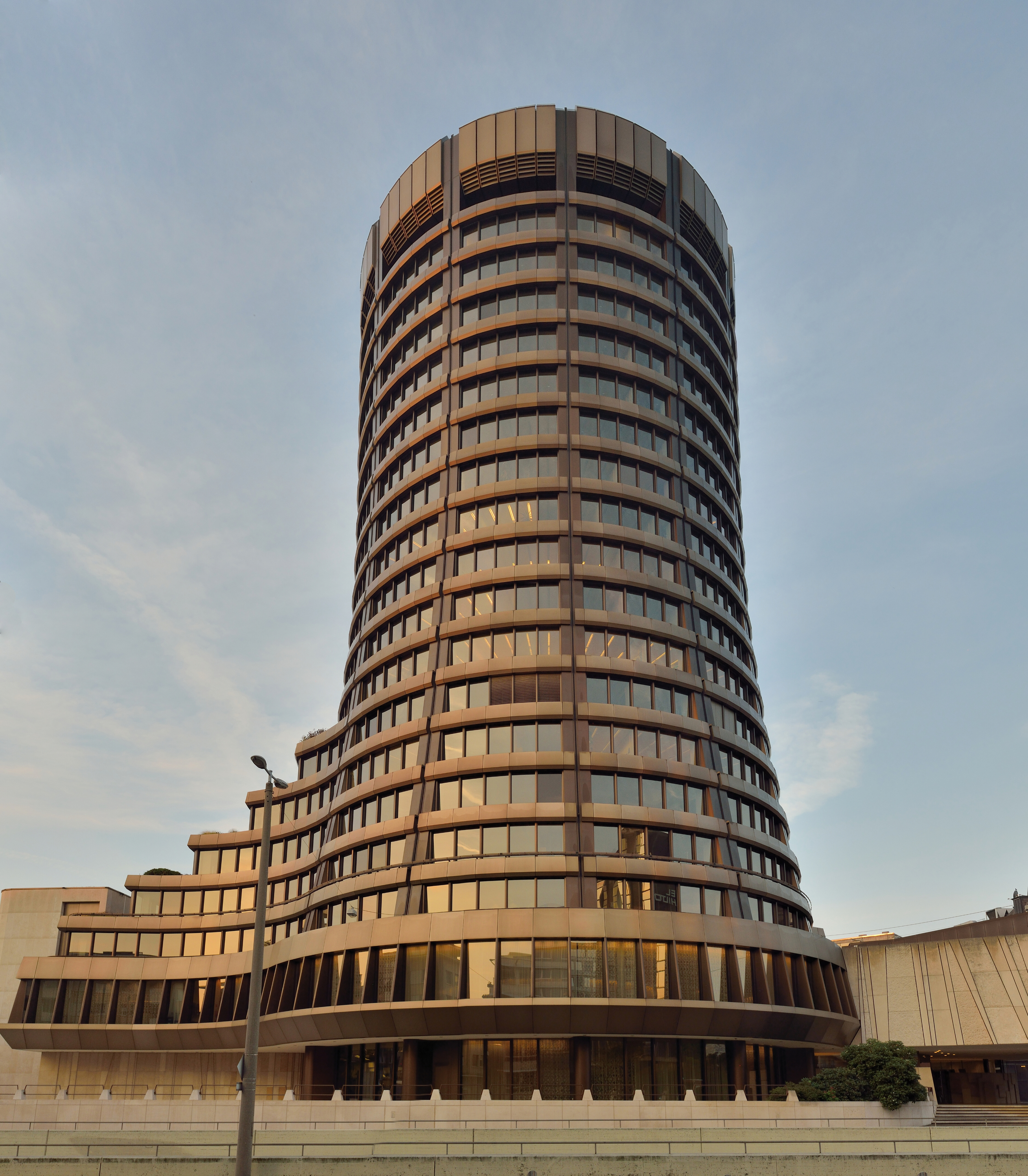
View from the northeast, the busy Nauenstrasse

The building has a volume of 174,000 cubic meters, almost half of which is underground. Because the high-rise is founded on Rhine gravel, the foundation slab under the tower is 150 centimeters thick, and another 60 centimeters thick at the edge of the basement. On the lower floors, columns, and walls are used as internal load-bearing elements, arranged radially at 15 and 30 degrees. In addition to the dead load, the reinforced concrete slabs also carry the live load and wind load, transferring these forces to the core. In addition to the elevators, the supply core also houses the exhaust ducts. Half of them run down and half run up to the two control centers. The plumbing and some of the electrical ducts are also located in the core. The external support areas bring air and cooling water to the parapet units. The floors close to the ground also have external staircases, which in turn transfer the stiffening load to the foundations.

The large 280-seat auditorium with a granite facade is located near the main entrance. The shed roof slopes toward the tower. This cantilevered building has a flag attachment point on the roof, which is used for flags at official events. On the forecourt in front of the base building, there is a water basin with a small fountain. The edge of the water basin matches the granite used for the base building.

=== Landscaping and planting ===
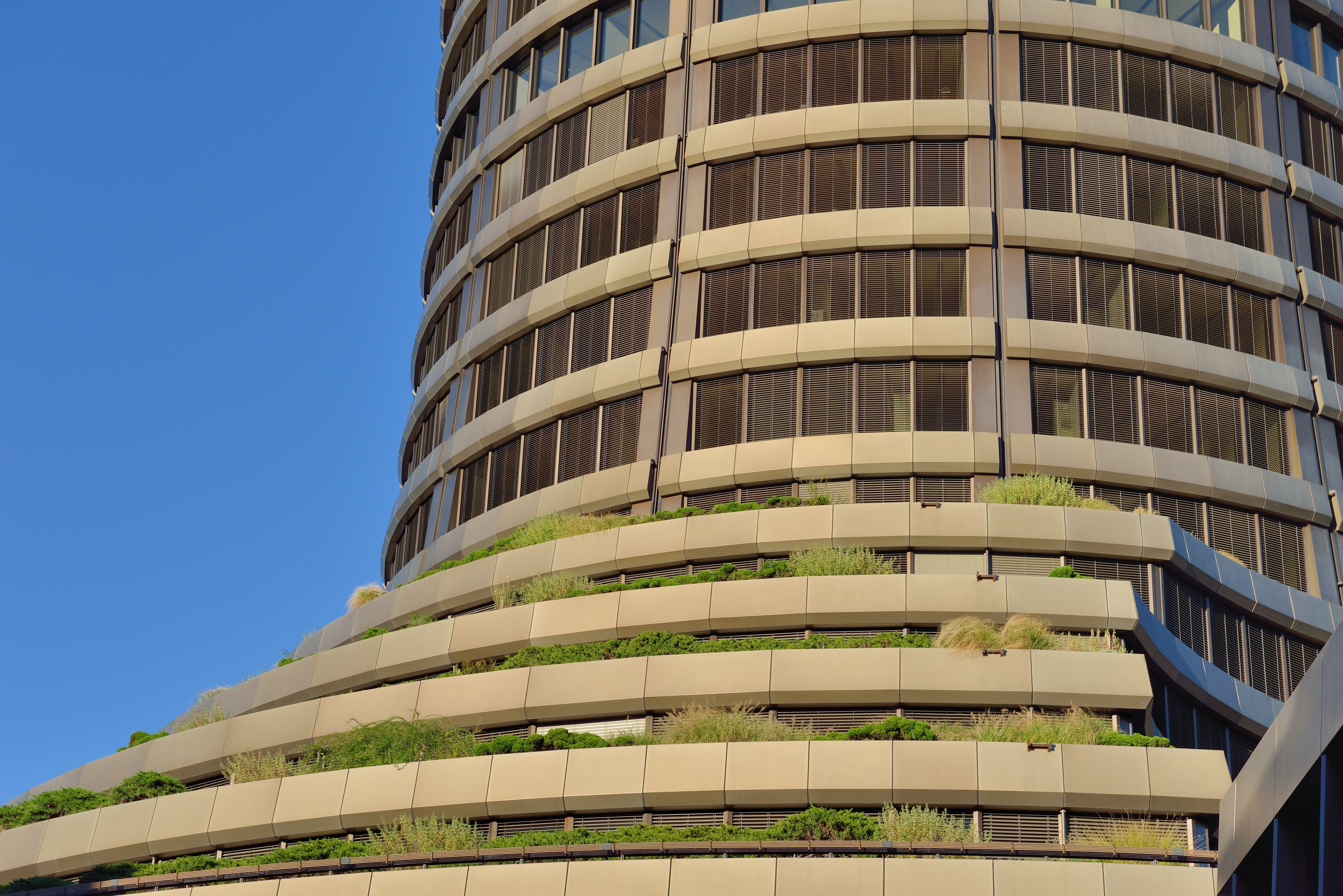
Terrace planting, view from Heumattstrasse

The BIS Tower is surrounded by this extensive base structure, the roof of which is also partially greened with richly planted terraced gardens and extends up to the seventh floor. This "flowing" base of stepped terraces to the southeast and southwest represents a design compromise. The freestanding tower is designed to integrate with its surroundings and, unlike conventional towers, has its front and back. Towards Nauenstrasse, the BIS tower appears representative and creates a counterpoint to the busy street. Towards Heumattstrasse and Gartenstrasse there is a heterogeneous mixture of traditional houses, parking garages, and post offices. The landscaped rear of the building is intended to create a connection to this side of the street. The gardens on the terraces and in the courtyards are landscaped with hardy groundcovers and perennials, including rhododendrons. The planting is intended to provide a necessary contrast to the massive tower architecture, creating a calm, restrained atmosphere.

=== Interior design ===
Since even members of the press are rarely granted access due to strict security regulations, only historical pictures and descriptions of the interior are known. Looking at the circular floor plan of the building, you can see the service shaft in the center, which houses the toilets and elevators. A corridor runs concentrically around this core, leading to the circular office spaces. The geometrically designed rooms are carpeted and the furnishings reflect an exclusive lounge atmosphere from the days when the BIS was based at the Grand Hotel. The arrangement of the lavishly upholstered leather armchairs allows for discretion and tranquility. According to J. M. Andreoli, who was head of the department at the BIS in the late 1970s, the BIS attached particular importance to this design.

Furthermore, due to the special character of the BIS Tower, no open-plan offices were implemented inside. Most of the workspaces are designed as individual offices. Semi-mobile plasterboard walls also provide good sound insulation.

The main entrance and staff restaurant are located on the first floor. The first floor contains a large foyer with the auditorium and four other meeting and conference rooms, as well as simultaneous interpretation facilities for several languages. The 16th floor is dedicated to office space, while the 18th floor has an integrated dining room, which is used for meetings of the board of directors and for receiving central bank governors. The 19th-floor houses part of the building services, including the central air conditioning system and the elevator engine room.

== Reception ==
As a typical 1970s building, the BIS Tower dominates the city skyline. Except for the Messe Tower and the Roche Tower, Basel has no other high-rise buildings over 100 meters tall, so the striking shape of the BIS Tower stands out from many parts of the city. The local press in Basel gave the tower a consistently positive reception. Even at the time of its construction, the building was described as a new landmark. An article in a special supplement of the Basler Zeitung spoke of an "undoubtedly impressive new creation" and a subtle design language thanks to the concave lines. The design also stood up to international comparison. The basic idea of "vegetative architecture" has been harmoniously implemented in the choice of materials, their texture, and color. The building creates a calm, reserved atmosphere. In a 2003 retrospective, the magazine Architektur & Technik praised the building's location near the SBB railway station as a well-chosen choice because of the important impulses it provides. Several buildings of urban significance, such as the Peter Merian Haus, have been built around the railway tracks, significantly enhancing the district.

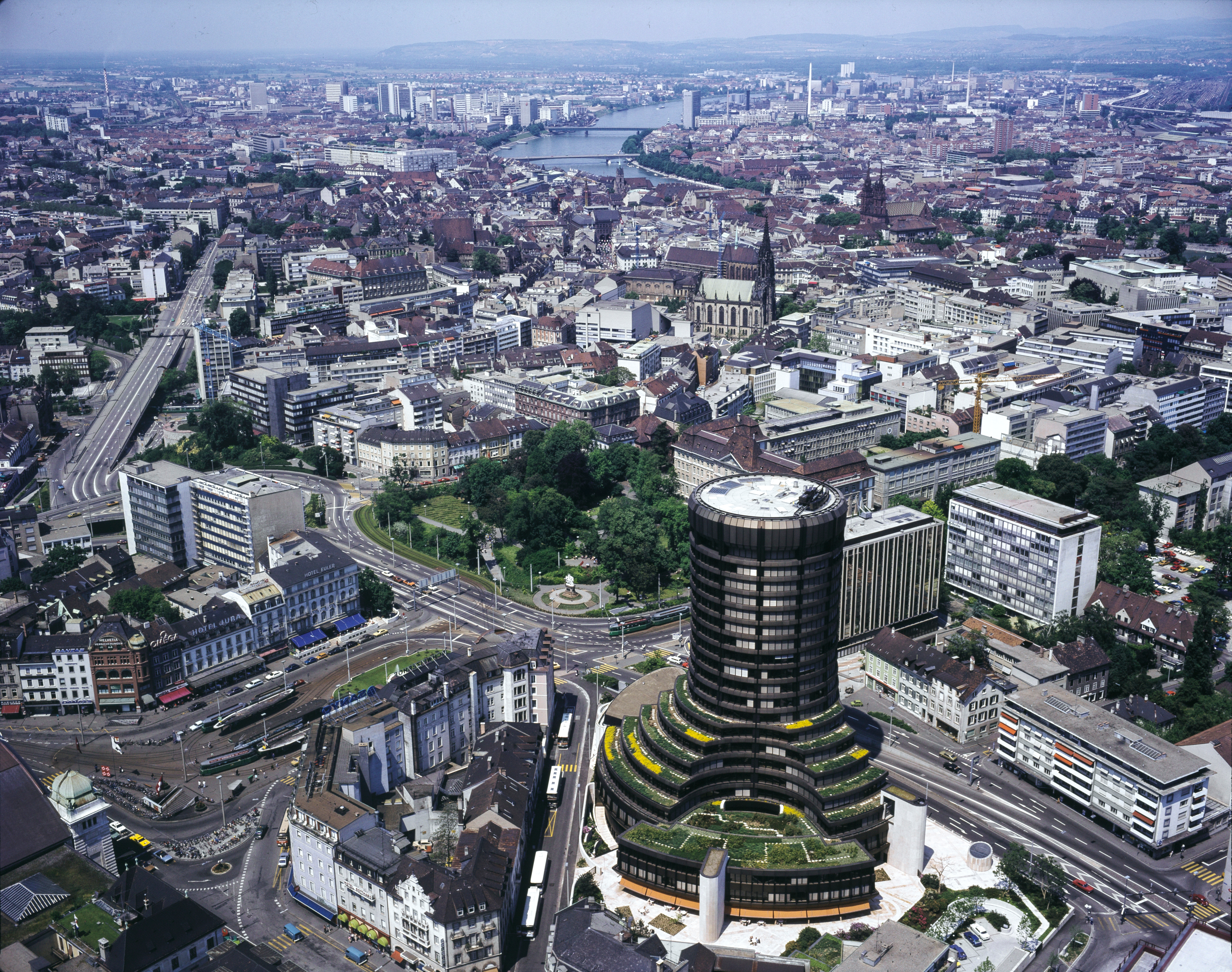
BIS tower with the old town and Rhine bend

The BIS Tower had a direct structural impact on the Hilton Hotel across the street, which opened in 1975, closed in 2015, and was demolished in 2016. The hotel's color scheme was adopted in direct consultation with the architectural firm Burckhardt and Partners. Other new buildings in the 1970s, such as the new headquarters of the Swiss Bank Corporation (now the UBS building) on Aeschenplatz, also used the same building materials for the facade design as the BIS.

In critical reporting on the global financial world, which is also significantly shaped by the Bank for International Settlements, the BIS tower is often depicted and described as the "Tower of Basel" or its construction as the "Tower of Basel". This is intended to evoke associations with the Tower of Babel as a symbol of the financial world's hubris and striving for power. However, this symbol is primarily derived from the international financial institution and its role rather than from the building itself.

== Bibliography ==
- Bank für internationalen Zahlungsausgleich. In: werk. 1/1976, p. 752 (doi:10.5169/seals-48643).
- J. M. Andreoli: Das Verwaltungsgebäude der BIZ. Internal publication of the BIS, Basel (year of publication unknown).
- Max Hoch, Max Egloff: Absteckung des Gebäudes für Internationalen Zahlungsausgleich (BIZ) in Basel. In: Schweizerische Bauzeitung. September 1977, p. 605–608 (doi:10.5169/seals-73441).
- Wolf Hunziker: Umgebungsgestaltung zum Verwaltungsgebäude der Bank für Internationalen Zahlungsausgleich (BIZ) in Basel. In: Anthos. 20/1981, p. 1–5 (doi:10.5169/seals-135362).
- Martin H. Burckhardt: Baulust. Basel 2000, ISBN 3-905065-35-5, p. 202–209.
- Am Fusse des Turms. In: Architektur & Technik. ARGUS of Presse Ltd, Zurich 12/2003 (magazine supplement).
- Grand Council of the Canton of Basel-City: Ratschlag „Areal Bank für Internationalen Zahlungsausgleich (BIZ)“, Basel 11/2014 (PDF; 1,9 MB).
