= Christoph Burckhardt-Merian =

Swiss merchant involved in cotton and slave trade (1740–1812)

Christoph Burckhardt
- Born: July 10, 1740; Basel, Switzerland
- Died: April 3, 1812 (aged 71); Basel, Switzerland
- Occupations: Merchant, judge
- Known for: Cotton trade, slave trade, contraband during Continental Blockade
- Spouse: Dorothea Merian (m. 1764)
- Children: 5 sons
- Parent(s): Christoph Burckhardt (1708-1789); Marie Elisabeth Vischer

Christoph Burckhardt (10 July 1740 – 3 April 1812) was a Swiss merchant from Basel who became an important figure in international trade. He was actively involved in the cotton trade, printed cotton (indienne) commerce, and the Atlantic slave trade, operating through an extensive network of business relationships across Europe and the Atlantic.

== Early life and family ==
Christoph Burckhardt was born into a prominent merchant family in Basel on 10 July 1740. He was the son of Christoph Burckhardt (1708–1789), a trader and member of the Grand Council of Basel, and Marie Elisabeth Vischer. In 1764, he married Dorothea Merian (1744–1821), daughter of Daniel Merian (1718–1775), a textile merchant and banker, and Barbara Sarasin. The couple had five sons together.

== Business career ==
At age 21, Burckhardt joined his father's company, Christoph Burckhardt & Sohn. From 1787 to 1798, he served as a judge at the Basel tribunal. In 1787, he acquired the Seebacherhof on Blumenrain in Basel, where he constructed a new residence called the Segerhof (1788–1791). This building served both as his family home and as the headquarters for his company, Christoph Burckhardt & Cie, which he founded in 1790.

=== Cotton and textile trade ===
Like other Basel entrepreneurs, Burckhardt purchased printed cotton fabrics (indiennes) from manufacturers in Alsace and Baden for resale primarily in the French market. The Segerhof became the center of his international trade in cotton textiles and colonial products. When the economic crisis hit France beginning in 1791, Burckhardt was forced to diversify his business activities and seek new markets.

=== Involvement in the slave trade ===
The economic difficulties in France led Burckhardt to enter the triangular trade. His father had already participated in the slave trade by acquiring shares in slave ships (between 1783 and 1815, the family businesses invested in 21 slave trading vessels). To establish himself in this trade, Christoph Burckhardt relied on close business relationships with Basel trading houses located on the French Atlantic coast, including Emmanuel and Nicolas Weis and Sons in La Rochelle, and Riedy & Thurninger and Benoît Bourcard in Nantes.

Christophe Bourcard (1766–1815) was both a distant relative and business associate. Bourcard established himself in Nantes in 1789 and founded the company Bourcard, Legrand & Cie the following year (later renamed Bourcard Fils & Cie). The Segerhof used this subsidiary to engage in the slave trade. Other Basel merchants participated in this venture, including brothers Johann Jakob and Christoph Merian, as well as the banks Pourtalès, Perregaux, Hottinguer & Rougemont, which had become integrated into Parisian Haute Banque following the troubles of the French Revolution.

To cope with the impact on Atlantic trade of the slave revolt in the French colony of Saint-Domingue (Haiti) and the maritime war between France and England, Christophe Bourcard also invested in his own slave ships, including the Intrépide and the Cultivateur. However, facing repeated financial losses, Bourcard committed suicide in 1815.

For Christoph Burckhardt, the triangular trade represented a relatively secondary activity that allowed him access to the West African market, where printed cottons were in high demand. While the slave trade brought him little profit and he suffered heavy losses during maritime expeditions, the business connection proved valuable for other commercial activities.

=== Continental Blockade and contraband ===
Burckhardt found much greater financial success through contraband operations during the Continental Blockade. After establishing a network of transport companies, he organized the illegal transport of English goods to Basel, selling approximately 80% of these commodities in France. The city of Belfort served as a crucial hub for the continuation of this illicit traffic. This smuggling operation proved far more profitable than his involvement in the slave trade.

== See also ==
- Burckhardt family

== Bibliography ==
- Burckhardt-Sarasin, Carl: Aus der Geschichte der Grosshandelsfirmen und «Indiennes Fabriques» Christoph Burckhardt und Sohn in der «Goldenen Müntz» und dem «Ernauerhof» Christoph Burckhardt & Cie. im «Sägerhof» mit seiner Nanter Filiale, 1950.
- Burckhardt, Sibylle E.: "Basler Wohnkultur im 18./19. Jahrhundert: der Segerhof", in: Burckhardtsche Familienstiftung (ed.): ckdt. (Basel). Streiflichter auf Geschichte und Persönlichkeiten des Basler Geschlechts Burckhardt, 1990, pp. 103–130.
- Debrunner, Hans W.: "Basel und der Sklavenhandel. Fragmente eines wenig bekannten Kapitels der Basler Geschichte", in: Basler Stadtbuch 1993, 1994, pp. 95–101.
- Fierz, Peter: Eine Basler Handelsfirma im ausgehenden 18. und zu Beginn des 19. Jahrhunderts: Christoph Burckhardt & Co. und verwandte Firmen, doctoral thesis, University of Zurich, 1994.
- Stettler, Niklaus: "Regionalisierung trotz Globalisierungsstrategie. Die Grosshandelsfirma Christoph Burckhardt & Co. in Basel und ihre Tochtergesellschaft Bourcard Fils & Comp. in Nantes, 1789-1813", in: Gilomen, Hans Jörg; Müller, Margrit; Veyrassat, Béatrice (ed.): La globalisation – chances et risques. La Suisse dans l'économie mondiale 18e-20e siècles, 2003, pp. 99–111.
- Stettler, Niklaus; Haenger, Peter; Labhardt, Robert: Baumwolle, Sklaven und Kredite. Die Basler Welthandelsfirma Christoph Burckhardt & Cie. in revolutionärer Zeit (1789-1815), 2004.
- Haenger, Peter; Labhardt, Robert: "Basel und der Sklavenhandel. Das Beispiel der Burckhardtschen Handelshäuser zwischen 1780 und 1815", in: Bott, Sandra; David, Thomas et al. (ed.): Suisse – Afrique (18e-20e siècles). De la traite des Noirs à la fin du régime de l'apartheid, 2005, pp. 25–42.
- Fässler, Hans: Une Suisse esclavagiste. Voyage dans un pays au-dessus de tout soupçon, 2007.
