= Burkard =

Burkard may refer to:

- Burkard (given name)
- Burkard (surname)
