= Jerome Burkard =

Dominica footballer

Personal information
- Full name: Jerome Nicolas Burkard
- Date of birth: 14 November 2002 (age 23)
- Place of birth: Portsmouth, Dominica
- Position: Goalkeeper

Team information
- Current team: Dublanc

Senior career*
Years	Team	Apps	(Gls)
2023–	Dublanc		

International career^{‡}
2023–	Dominica	3	(0)
- * Club domestic league appearances and goals ‡ National team caps and goals as of 13:29, 23 October 2024 (UTC)

Jerome Burkard (born 14 November 2002) is a Dominica association footballer who currently plays for as a goalkeeper for Dublanc and the Dominica national team.

== Club career ==
As a youth, Burkard played for the North Strikers FC. In 2017, he was named the Best Goalkeeper in the under-15 division at the annual Dominica Football Association Awards ceremony. The same season, he also played for Portsmouth Bombers in the national under-17 division. The club advanced to the tournament final, with Burkard being substituted in during the second half of the championship match against Tarish United. Despite a number of saves from Burkhard, Bombers were not able to overcome the first-half deficit and ultimately lost 1–4. In 2018, Burkard led his school team to the national under-20 title, earning MVP and Best Goalkeeper awards for the final tournament in the process.

Burkard competed with Dublanc FC in the 2024 CFU Club Shield. His strong performance helped earn a victory over Village Superstars of Saint Kitts and Nevis to advance to the Semi-finals of the competition. Despite another strong showing by Burkard, Dublanc ultimately fell to Antiguan club Grenadines in the semi-final match. Dublanc finished fourth in the competition, losing to Atlético Pantoja in the bronze final. Following the 1–1 regulation draw, Burkard converted a penalty during the ensuing shootout in addition to being in goal, but Atlético Pantoja ultimately took home the bronze medal.

== International career ==
Burkard represented Dominica at the youth level, including at the 2017 CONCACAF Boys' Under-15 Championship. In preparation for the tournament, he was part of the national under-15 team that took part in the Soualiga Cup in Sint Maarten in June 2017.

Burkard made his senior international debut on 20 November 2023 in a 2023–24 CONCACAF Nations League C match against Turks and Caicos, earning a shutout in the 2–0 victory. He earned his second cap the following May in a friendly against Saint Vincent and the Grenadines in preparation for 2026 FIFA World Cup qualification. Burkard made a number of big saves in the match to earn the eventual 2–1 victory.

=== International career statistics ===
As of match played 12 October 2024.

Dominica national team
2023	1	0
2024	2	0
Total	3	0

== Personal life ==
Burkard is of Swiss descent. He and his brother Yannick were born near Portsmouth, Dominica to Swiss parents who moved to the island in 1993 to organize sports programs.
