= Louise Burkhart =

American academic

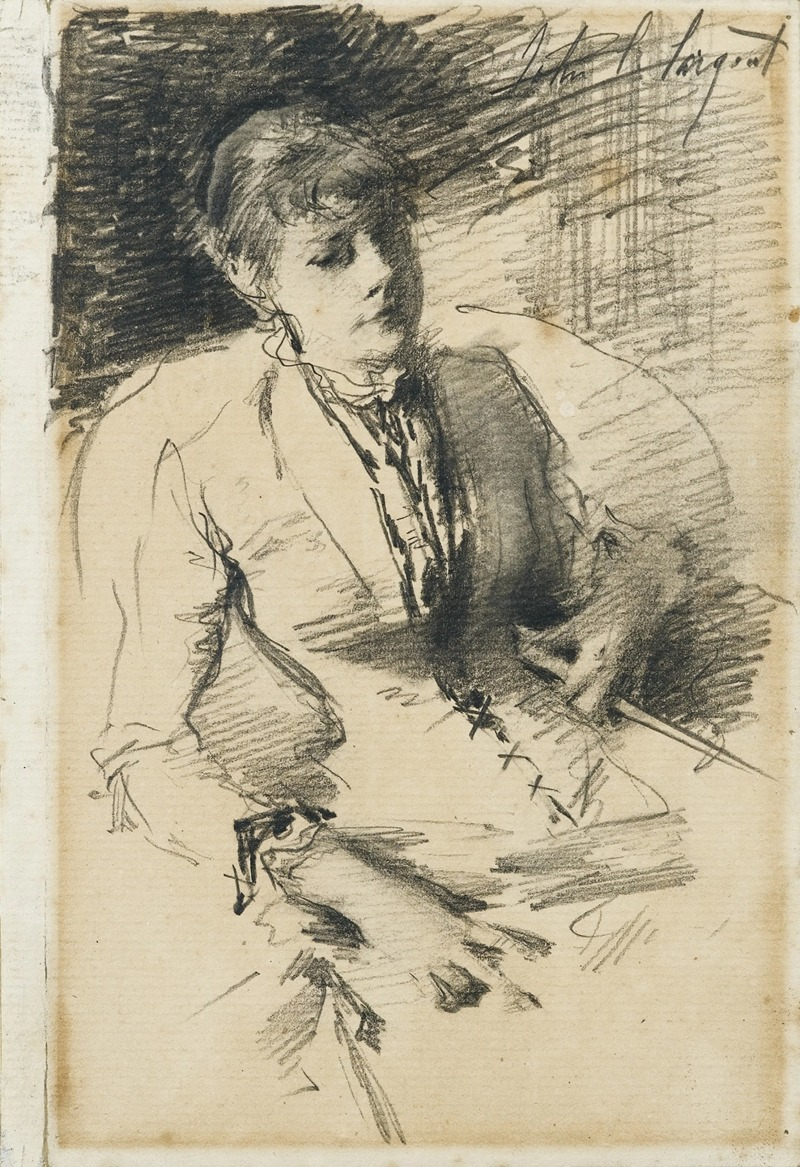
Portrait présumé de Madame Louise Burckhardt

Louise M. Burkhart (born 1958) is an American academic ethnohistorian and anthropologist, noted as a scholar of early colonial Mesoamerican literature. In particular, her published research has a focus on aspects of the religious beliefs and practices of Nahuatl-speakers in central Mexico. Her work examines the historical documentation from the time of the Spanish Conquest and the subsequent era of colonial Mexico, and studies the continuities and transformations of indigenous Nahua communities and culture. Burkhart has written extensively on colonial Nahuatl drama, folklore, poetry and catechistic texts, translating a number of these documents from the original Nahuatl with commentaries and historical interpretations and notes. She has also published research on the aesthetics and iconography of pre-Columbian and Indochristian art, Nahuatl linguistics, and the rise of the Virgin of Guadalupe cult within Mexican Roman Catholicism.

As of 2009 Burkhart is a professor in the Anthropology Department of the State University of New York at Albany (SUNY Albany), where she has taught since 1990.

== Studies and academic career ==
Burkhart studied for a B.A. in anthropology at Franklin & Marshall College, Lancaster, Pennsylvania, graduating summa cum laude in 1980. Her postgraduate studies were undertaken at Yale, where in 1982 she completed a M.Phil. in anthropology. Her course work included field research conducted in Mexico on Nahuatl language, literature, and communities.

After obtaining her master's degree Burkhart enrolled in Yale's doctorate studies program in anthropology, while also working as instructor and teaching assistant for courses on Nahuatl literature and Native American ethnography. Burkhart was awarded her Ph.D. in 1986, where her dissertation was supervised by renowned Mayanist scholar Michael D. Coe. Her dissertation, "The Slippery Earth: Nahua-Christian Moral Dialogue in Sixteenth-Century Mexico", was revised and published as a book in 1989 by University of Arizona Press.

In 1987 Burkhart received an American Philosophical Society Fellowship grant to conduct archival research in Madrid. Other fellowships and research grants obtained during the late 1980s include ones from Chicago's Newberry Library, a National Endowment for the Humanities grant for the John Carter Brown Library, and a fellowship in pre-Columbian studies at Dumbarton Oaks Research Library and Collection. During this time Burkhart also held adjunct and visiting lecturer positions at the University of Connecticut (1986–87) and Purdue University (1989–90).

In 1990 Burkhart joined the faculty at SUNY Albany as assistant professor. In conjunction with her ongoing academic research projects and publications, Burkhart has taught a variety of undergraduate and graduate courses at Albany. These include courses on Native American and Mesoamerican myths and folklore, ethnological theory, Mesoamerican texts and literature, anthropology and ethnology of Native American religion and pre-Columbian art, and Nahuatl language instruction. In 1997 Burkhart reached the academic rank of associate professor, and became a full professor in 2003. Her professorial appointment is jointly held between the Anthropology Department and the Department of Latin American and Caribbean Studies.
