= Bürkert =

German industrial measurement tools manufacturer

Bürkert Verwaltungs-Gesellschaft
- Type: GmbH
- Industry: Manufacturing, fluidics, toolmaking, automation
- Founded: 1946
- Headquarters: Ingelfingen, Germany
- Revenue: €710.7 million (2023)
- Number of employees: 3812 (2023)
- Website: burkert.com

The Bürkert Verwaltungs-Gesellschaft (often also referred as Burkert) and its affiliated companies are an international manufacturer of components and systems for measuring and controlling liquids and gases—fluid control (fluidics). Its products are used in industries such as the chemical industry, food and beverage industry, pharmaceutical industry, and water treatment. In 2023, the company employed 3,812 people and generated a total revenue of €710.7 million. The company is headquartered in Ingelfingen and operates production sites in Germany, France, China, the United States, and India. In addition, Systemhaus facilities develop and process customer-specific systems and services.

== History ==
The history of Bürkert dates back to 1946. Company founder Christian Bürkert initially developed temperature controllers for incubators and kitchen stoves. In the 1950s, the company shifted its focus towards the development and production of valve technology, particularly solenoid valves, which at that time were used, among other things, in washing machines. In 1956, the first production facility abroad was established.

When washing machines began to be manufactured more cheaply in the 1960s, Bürkert developed plastic-coated solenoid coils and standardized cable connectors. With its valves equipped accordingly, Bürkert began producing primarily for industrial applications. Moving away from the consumer market turned Bürkert into a specialist. In France—where there was initially resistance to the market entry of German companies after the war—Bürkert established a production facility in Alsace with support from the French government. A local subsidiary was also founded in the United Kingdom.

In 1971, Christian Bürkert was killed in a plane crash. At that time, his wife, Dorothee Bürkert, asked the employees to stay with the company for at least one year. Companies such as Siemens were interested in purchasing the business at that point. A large portion of the workforce honoured her request, and operations continued.

In the 1990s, the production line was expanded to include process valves, sensors, and mass flow controllers, turning the company into a full-range provider of fluidics products. Components and systems for process automation were also added. Moreover, during this period the company developed small, media-separated solenoid valves for life science applications, which helped open up new fields of activity for dental practices and hospitals. Since 1993, the first of the company's Systemhaus facilities has been located in Großröhrsdorf near Dresden, where Bürkert manufactures complete systems on behalf of customers. Additional Bürkert Systemhaus facilities followed in Germany in Ingelfingen-Criesbach (2007) and in Menden near Dortmund. International sites were added in Charlotte in the US, Suzhou in China, and India.

In 2007, an innovation hub was established at the company's headquarters in Ingelfingen. In 2014, Bürkert internally introduced the Efficient Device Integration Platform (EDIP), marking the company's entry into Industry 4.0. One year later, Bürkert expanded its business activities in the field of filling ultra-pure and sensitive media. In 2016, the Criesbach Campus with a logistics centre, a production and manufacturing facility with an innovation hub as well as a training and development centre was opened. In April 2017, Bürkert opened its new U.S. headquarters in Huntersville, North Carolina, covering an area of approximately 16,000 square metres.

After working together since 2021, Bürkert acquired a majority stake in the Swiss company ReseaTech in 2023. Also in 2023, Bürkert opened a new plant in Taicang. In 2024, this was followed by the construction of a new facility in Pune. In 2025, Bürkert made a strategic investment in the start-up Green Elephant Biotech. Together, the companies are developing a production platform for cell cultures.

== Christian Bürkert ==
Christian Bürkert (born 4 May 1915, in Ingelfingen; presumed deceased 21 October 1971, over the North Atlantic) was a German electrical engineer and the founder of the Bürkert Group. He grew up in Ingelfingen and studied electrical engineering in Berlin. After the Second World War, in 1946, he developed a temperature controller for incubators in the cellar of his family's home using parts from aeroplane wreckage. The motivation for his invention was the high demand for chicken among the US occupying forces.

Bürkert was also a pilot in his personal life, and as the company expanded abroad, he increasingly used air travel. In October 1971, he disappeared during a solo flight over the North Atlantic while attempting to ferry a new private aircraft from Newfoundland to Hohenlohe. Bürkert has been considered deceased since then, and his aircraft is presumed lost near the Azores.

== Company structure ==
The parent company of the Bürkert Group is Bürkert Verwaltungs-GmbH, headquartered in Ingelfingen. Bürkert remains family-owned and is held through foundations.

Since 2023, Georg Stawowy has been responsible for the management of the Bürkert Group. In 2023, the company employed 3,812 people and generated a total revenue of €710.7 million. In Germany, the company includes, among others, the subsidiaries Christian Bürkert GmbH & Co. KG, Ingelfingen (100%), Bürkert International GmbH, Ingelfingen (100%), and Bürkert GmbH & Co. KG, Ingelfingen (100%).

The production sites are located in Ingelfingen-Criesbach, Gerabronn, and Öhringen, in Triembach-au-Val in Alsace, in Taicang, Pune, and in Huntersville. The factory in Pune was inaugurated in October 2024 as the group’s third production site outside Europe and manufactures, among other things, mass flow controllers, angle seat valves, diaphragm valves and bespoke systems. In addition, several Systemhaus facilities worldwide develop and process customer-specific systems and services. These are located, among others, in Criesbach, Menden near Dortmund, Charlotte, US, and Taicang, China. There are five research and development centres. Bürkert is also internationally represented by its own sales companies, which in turn manage additional regional offices. Outside Germany, Bürkert is represented by 47 independent subsidiaries in 32 countries (as of 2022).

== Business activities ==
The activities of the Bürkert Group include, among other things, mechanical manufacturing, pump technology, coil production, plastics engineering, welding technology, software development, and toolmaking. Products include solenoid valves, process and analytical valves, pneumatic actuators and sensors, microfluidics, MFC/MFM devices, proportional valves, and control units. Bürkert products and systems are used across various industries, from brewing technology to laboratory and medical technology and aerospace applications.

In addition, Bürkert supplies complete systems tailored to the needs of its customers, for example for water treatment or hygienic applications for pharmaceutical manufacturing. The company supplies, among other things, valves of various designs and types and builds complete ATEX-certified control cabinet systems for field automation.

== Christian and Dorothee Bürkert Foundation ==
In 1978, Dorothee Bürkert established the Christian Bürkert Foundation, thereby fulfilling the wishes of her late husband, Christian Bürkert. She later contributed her shares in the company's capital to the foundation to allocate returns to charitable purposes and to preserve the Bürkert Group as a whole. In 2024, the foundation was renamed the Christian and Dorothee Bürkert Foundation by its curators to honour the contributions of Dorothee Bürkert and to further develop the foundation's organisational structure. In addition, its legal form was converted from a non-profit limited liability company (gGmbH) into a civil law foundation, resulting in the establishment of a foundation council.

The Christian and Dorothee Bürkert Foundation is active, among other areas, in the field of education to support young people, as well as in social initiatives within the region. In 2022, a total of 91 scholarships were awarded to twelve schools, colleges, and universities in Germany. The funding volume for these students amounted to €128,000. In the area of social support, the foundation funded 23 projects in Heilbronn and Hohenlohe with a total of €130,000, including six projects that provided direct assistance to people who had fled Ukraine. Since the foundation was established, approximately 200 different projects have been supported (as of 2022).
