= Franz Burkard (died 1584) =

Franz Burkard (died 1584 in Bonn) was a canon lawyer.

For many years he served the Bavarian chancellor, August Loesch of Petersdorf, as legal advisor. Later the Elector of Cologne, Ernest of Bavaria, made him his private counsellor and chancellor. His staunch defence of Catholicism earned the praise of Peter Canisius.

To quell growing religious animosity between Catholics and Protestants in Bavaria, a work under his name, De Autonomiâ, was published in Munich in 1586. Its real author, the private secretary of the king, Andreas Erstenberger, in order to avoid scandal, was induced by William V of Bavaria to pretend that it had been written by the now dead Burkard, as Rudolph II was hostile to anti-Protestant works.
