= Tomasz Burghardt =

Polish Catholic Priest (1965–2025)

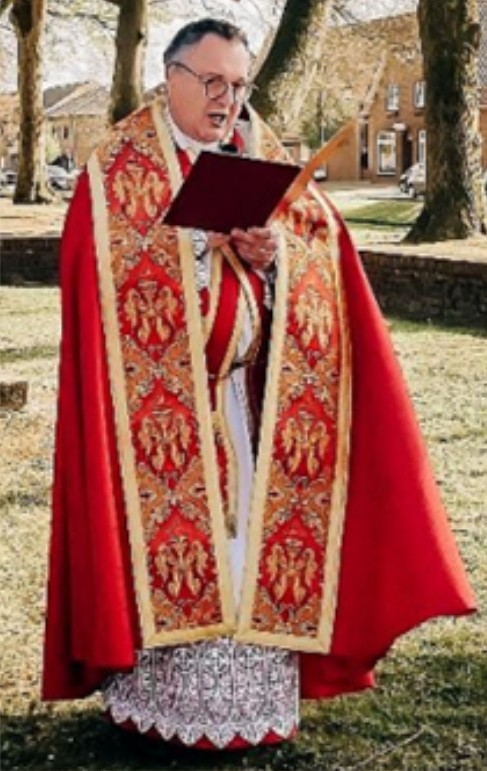
- Burghardt on Palm Sunday 2025, three days before his passing
- Born: 26 July 1965; Wrocław, Polish People's Republic
- Died: 16 April 2025 (aged 59); Geeste, Germany
- Burial place: St. Lawrence Cemetery in Wrocław
- Ordained: 22 May 1993 by Henryk Gulbinowicz

Tomasz Burghardt (26 July 1965 – 16 April 2025) was a Polish Catholic priest who served in Poland and Germany.

== Biography ==
Burghardt began his priestly path in Środa Śląska, where he served for three years in the parish of the Holy Cross. Then he went to Wrocław – to the parish of St. Francis of Assisi, and then to Lądek-Zdrój. For the following years he also worked in Bierutów and Wołów.

In 2002, he began his ministry in the parish of Divine Mercy in Oława. Three years later, he was entrusted with the management of Caritas of the Wrocław Archdiocese. During his term of office, the Caritas Home Hospice was established, which provided care to patients from four counties: Wrocław, Oława, Strzelin and Ząbkowice. Caritas also organized holidays for over 4,300 children and young people, including 40 Polish children from Belarus.

Thanks to his involvement, two rehabilitation facilities were opened in 2007 – in Henryków and Małkowice. The Health Care Facility was also expanded to include new facilities in Dobroszyce and Małkowice. A year later, in 2008, the Nursing and Care Facility was established in Małkowice.

In 2010, at the request of the Metropolitan of Wrocław Marian Gołębiewski, Father Burghardt left for Germany, where he began his ministry at the Polish Catholic Mission in Münster. Three years later he was appointed pastor of Poles in northwestern Germany and on the East Frisian Islands.

In the last years of his life he was the parish priest of four German-speaking parishes in the Emsland Mitte Deanery: Geeste, Dalum, Groß Hesepe and Osterbrock. At the same time, he continued to care for Poles living in the Ostfriesland and Emsland regions.

His funeral took place on 30 April at the Wrocław Cathedral and was led by Bishop Jacek Kiciński and Fr. Adam Łuźniak.
