= Franz Burkard (died 1539) =

Franz Burkard (died 1539) was a canon lawyer in Ingolstadt who opposed Lutheranism, particularly in the trial of Andreas Seehofer.
