= Blumenrain =

Coordinates: 46°56′38″N 7°26′22″E

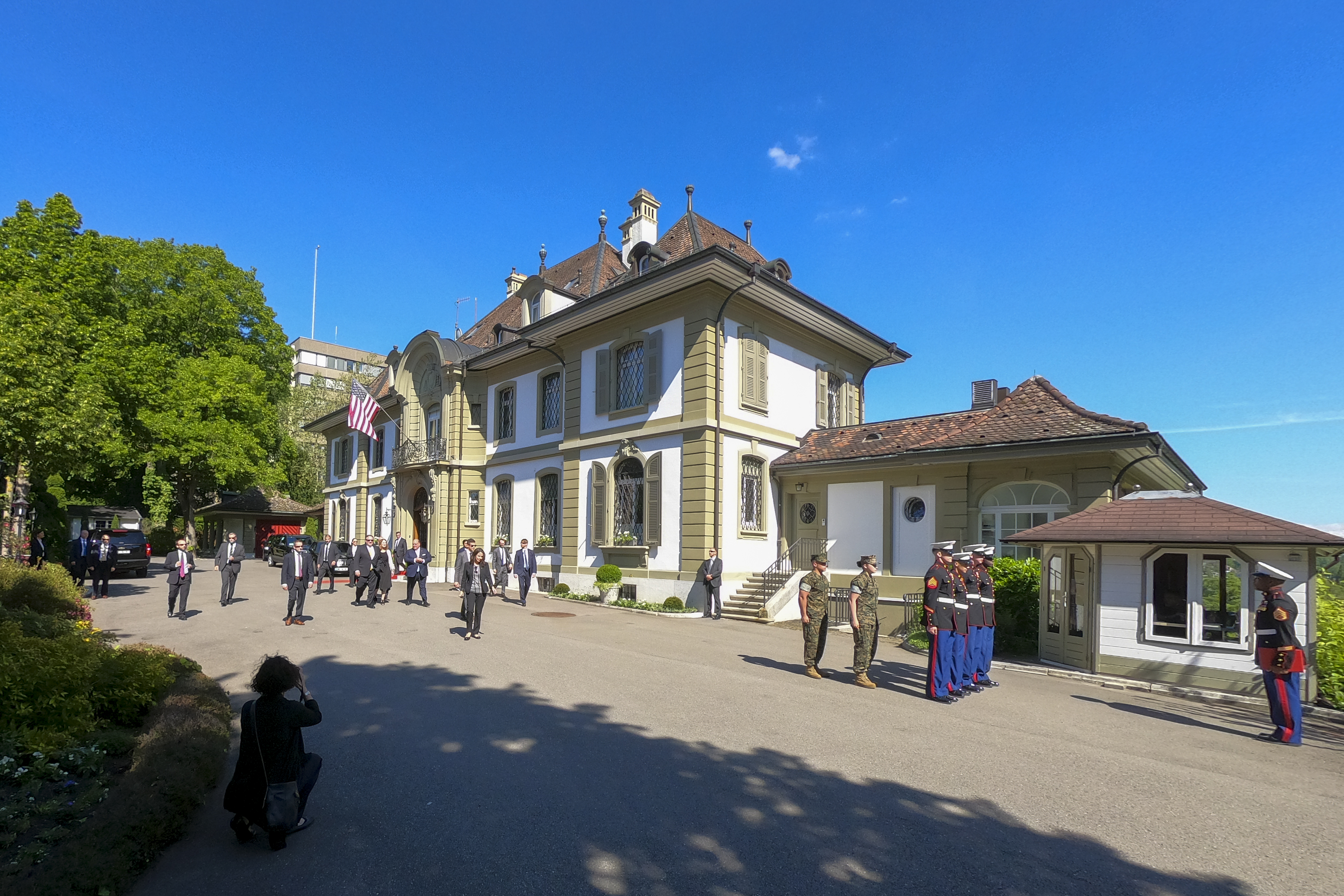

General information
- Type: Official residence
- Address: Rainmattstrasse 21
- Town or city: Bern
- Country: Switzerland
- Current tenants: U.S. Ambassador to Switzerland and Liechtenstein and family (since 1947)
- Year(s) built: early 19th century
- Owner: United States government

Blumenrain (German pronunciation: [ˈbluːmənraɪ̯n]) is the official residence of the United States Ambassador to Switzerland and Liechtenstein. It is located in the Monbijou area of Bern, Switzerland. The United States Department of State purchased the property in 1947 and has been furnished by the Foreign Buildings Office (FBO) 1947, 1948 and 1949 in a mixture of styles including Louis XIV, XV, XVI and "American Comfortable." In 1977, FBO had its interior decorator refurbish some of the reception and Ambassadorial rooms.

== History ==
The current residence of the ambassador is located on the grounds which once were home to the cottage of Elisabeth von Fischer (née Daxelhof), of a wealthy Bernese Patrician family. Between 1823 and 1837 it has been owned by August Friedrich Wilhelm von Wurstemberger, originally the grounds encompassed also where currently the building of the Federal Department of Justice and Police is located.

In 1912, Dr. Albert de Muralt, also of a Patrician family, purchased the property and commissioned the new building to famous architect René von Wurstemberger (1857–1923), a relative of the former owner. The house was then referred to as "Rain" which was one of his last works, another notable one being the Bern Theatre.

Upon the death of de Muralt it was inherited by his children; Raoul de Muralt, Yvonne Barbara Favre (née de Muralt), Genevieve Marie von Tavel (née de Muralt) and Hermine Germaine Syz (née de Muralt). They sold the building and grounds in 1947 to the United States Department of State for 672,200 Swiss Francs (approximately $155,825 at the time). The first to occupy the building was Leland B. Harrison on a private lease.
