= Jacinthe Bouchard =

Canadian animal behaviorist and trainer

Jacinthe Bouchard is a Canadian animal behaviorist and trainer. Bouchard is from Montreal and has lived in Mauricie for almost thirty years. She is widely recognized as a trainer of zoo animals, as well as a dog trainer and is the director of the only government-licensed animal training school in Canada. Bouchard and other trainers at Zoo Academy, have trained several crows to locate lost hikers in the forest. She is the author of Devenez le meilleur ami de votre chien [Become your dog's best friend]. Bouchard also appears on the Salut Boujour Week End television show.
