= Burgheard (disambiguation) =

Burgheard is an Anglo-Saxon male name. It may refer to:

- Burgheard (fl. 869), bishop of Lindsey (or perhaps Lichfield)
- Burgheard, son of Ælfgar (died 1061), son of Ælfgar, Earl of Mercia

== See also ==
- Burchard (disambiguation)
- Bouchard
