= Jenny Burckhardt =

Swiss artist (1849–1935)

Johanna Louise Karolina Burckhardt (22 August 1849 – 29 September 1935), professionally known as Jenny Burckhardt, was a Swiss painter.
