= Heinrich Christian Burckhardt =

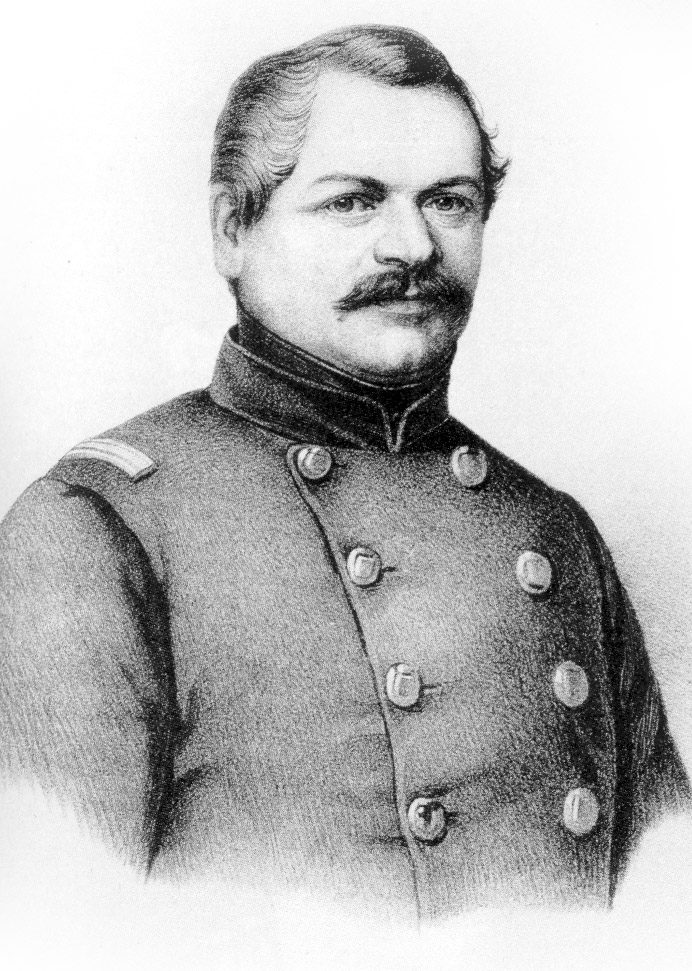
Heinrich Christian Burckhardt

Heinrich Christian Burckhardt (26 February 1811, Adelebsen – 14 December 1879, Hannover) was a German forester and entomologist.

In 1853 Burckhardt became the first civil director of forest administration in the Kingdom of Hanover (after 1866 a province of Prussia. He wrote Säen und Pflanzen nach forstlicher Praxis: ein Beitrag zur Holzerziehung (Sowing and planting in forestry practice: a contribution to forest education) published in Hannover by Rümpler in 1855. This work contains sections on pest insects.
