= Ben Purkert =

American poet and novelist

Ben Purkert is an American poet, novelist, and creative writing instructor. He is the author of the 2018 poetry collection For the Love of Endings and the 2023 novel The Men Can't Be Saved. For the Love of Endings was selected as one of The Adroit Journal's Best Poetry Books of the Year in 2018.

== Early life and education ==
Purkert was born in New Jersey. He was raised Jewish. He holds degrees from Harvard University and New York University, where he was a New York Times Fellow.

== Career ==
After graduating college, Purkert worked as a copywriter for a branding agency. He has worked as a creative writing instructor at Rutgers University and is currently teaching in the MFA program at Sarah Lawrence College. In 2018, he founded the Guernica interview series Back Draft, which focuses on the revision process of poets and authors.

Four Way Books published Purkert's debut poetry collection, For the Love of Endings, in 2018. The Adroit Journal included For the Love of Endings on its Adroit's Best of: Poetry 2018 list. The book also received favorable reviews from Publishers Weekly, Flypaper Lit, American Micro Reviews, and more. About the book, The Kenyon Review wrote: "Purkert corners the reader right at the tight intersection of anxiety and desire, illuminating how often the two can be mistaken for each other." A review from Colorado State University's Center for Literary Publishing called it "an exciting, weird, and weirdly exciting book."

The Overlook Press, an imprint of Abrams Books, published Purkert's debut novel, The Men Can't Be Saved, in 2023. Kirkus Reviews called the book "Ironic, plangent, gritty, and, ultimately, spiritual." A review in Esquire called it "a 21st-century Catcher in the Rye," and The Washington Post described Purkert as "a sharply funny observer of male foibles, 20-something angst and the modern workplace." Publishers Weekly called the book "great fun" and wrote: "the finely wrought prose and spot-on descriptions are undeniable." Surrounding the publication of The Men Can't Be Saved, Purkert was interviewed by NPR, Esquire, Bomb, Electric Literature, and elsewhere.

== Works ==
- (2018) For the Love of Endings. Four Way Books. ISBN 978-1-945588-05-1
- (2023) The Men Can't Be Saved. The Overlook Press. ISBN 978-1-4197-6713-5
