= Walter Burckhardt =

Swiss dermatologist

- Born: 2 March 1905; Zurich, Switzerland
- Died: 29 October 1971 (aged 66); Zurich, Switzerland
- Citizenship: Switzerland
- Education: University of Zürich
- Scientific career
- Fields: Dermatology
- Workplaces: University of Zurich

Walter Burckhardt (2 March 1905 – 29 October 1971) was a Swiss dermatologist most notable for his contributions on occupational dermatoses.

During the 1930s, Burckhardt took over from Max Tièche the management of the City Department for Skin and Venereal Diseases in Zurich; he became Privatdozent in 1938 and Titularprofessor in 1947 at the University of Zurich.

== Publications ==
- Peter J. Lynch, Stephan Epstein (editors). Burckhardt's Atlas and manual of dermatology and venerology. Williams & Wilkins, Baltimore 1977, ISBN 0-683-01134-0
