= Hans Burchardt =

American woodcarver

- Born: February 9, 1904; Germany
- Died: September 8, 1992 (aged 88); Lincoln, Nebraska, U.S.
- Occupation: Woodcarver

Hans O. Burchardt (February 9, 1904 – September 8, 1992) was an American woodcarver who designed animals. His work can be seen at the Museum of Nebraska Art.
