= Jeanne-d'Arc Bouchard =

Quiebecoise nun and nurse

Jeanne-d'Arc Bouchard CM CQ
- Born: 1929 (age 95–96); Saint-Hedwidge, Quebec, Canada
- Occupations: Nun, nurse
- Years active: 1953–
- Organization: Augustines de la Miséricorde de Jésus
- Known for: Care and advocacy for alcohol and drug addicts

Sister Jeanne-d'Arc Bouchard CM CQ (born 1929 in Sainte-Hedwidge) is a Québécoise nun and nurse.

== Biography ==
In 1945, at the age of sixteen, Jeanne-d'Arc Bouchard joined the Augustinian congregation of the Mercy of Jesus of Roberval, Quebec. In 1953 she graduated as a nurse and worked with alcoholics and drug addicts. In the 1960s Bouchard initiated the first public program that supported the families of her patients. Until 1989, she was in charge of the Rehabilitation Unit at Hôtel-Dieu de Roberval.

Sister Bouchard was a pioneer in the rehabilitation of alcohol and drug addicts in Canada. In 1992 she was the first recipient of the award of excellence from the Quebec Association of Addiction Practitioners (AITQ); the award now bears her name. In 2000 Quebec Premier Lucien Bouchard presented her with the Chevalier badge of the National Order of Quebec. In 2008 Bouchard was made a Member of the Order of Canada.

A bronze bust of Bouchard by Jérémie Giles was erected in Roberval near the sculpture of Christ the King on the Rue Brassard.
