= Jeanette Arocho-Burkart =

American sergeant

- Military career
- Allegiance: United States
- Branch: United States Army
- Rank: Sergeant
- Unit: Guantanamo Bay
- Other work: Contractor, Phoenix Consulting; Interrogation instructor, Fort Huachuca

Jeanette Arocho-Burkart was a Sergeant E-5 in the United States Army.

== Military career ==
Arocho-Burkart was an interrogator at the American prison in the US naval base at Guantanamo Bay. She is known as one of the female interrogators who used sexual humiliation, and sexual taunting, to break the will of her devout Muslim captives. The New York Daily News reported that she forced her captives to fondle her breasts. She also wore skimpy clothing to make the Muslim detainees being questioned stressed and uncomfortable.

In her most widely reported incident, Arocho-Burkart reached inside her pants, and smeared red dye on the face of her bound captive, telling him she was menstruating and that she was smearing his face with her menstrual blood. She then told her captives that the water in their cell would be turned off, so they could not wash off her menses. Muslims are supposed to pray five times a day. But Muslims are not allowed to pray if they are "unclean".

Arocho-Burkart was not charged over her choice of interrogation techniques. She did, however, receive what was later described as a "strong, immediate, verbal reprimand". A later story claimed she had received a 30-day suspension.

== Civilian career ==
After Arocho-Burkart retired from the Army, she spent a year as a contractor with the Phoenix Consulting Group. During her stint with the company, Arocho-Burkart was reportedly handpicked by the Defense Intelligence Agency, which was then run by Maj. Gen. Barbara Fast, to teach "strategic debriefing." Fast was the most senior military intelligence officer serving in Iraq during the Abu Ghraib torture and prisoner abuse scandal. Arocho-Burkart was then hired as a civilian interrogation instructor at Fort Huachuca. Following the publication of her activities in Guantanamo, Arocho-Burkart was fired from her instructor job at Fort Huachuca.
