= 2011–12 Los Angeles arson attacks =

Series of arson attacks in Los Angeles, California

The 2011–2012 Los Angeles arson attacks were a series of fires started on December 29, 2011, in Los Angeles, California. It was the worst case of arson reported in the area since the 1992 Los Angeles riots. Harry Burkhart, then 24, who was wanted in Germany on suspicion of burning down his home, was charged in Los Angeles in January 2012 with 28 counts of arson of property and nine counts of arson of an inhabited structure. Prosecutors said that Burkhart was "motivated by rage against Americans" and sought to terrorize as many people as possible when he torched dozens of cars, homes and garages late at night, when most residents were sleeping, to inflict maximum fear and damage.

Burkhart was found guilty on September 1, 2016, of all 49 counts.

== Overview ==
The arsonist generally targeted cars, many of them parked in apartment building garages or carports. Police reports indicated that an accelerant was used and that the attacks were occurring at night. No injuries were reported, and the total amount of damage was estimated at up to $2 million. Among the buildings damaged was a home in which singer Jim Morrison once lived.

=== Timeline ===
On the morning of December 29, twenty-one fires were set in the metropolitan area of Los Angeles. All of the initial fires were set within five hours of each other, making authorities suspect arson. By the next day, there were thirty-five fires spanning Los Angeles County. There were the twenty-one in Hollywood and West Hollywood. In addition there were eight in North Hollywood, three in the San Fernando Valley foothills, three in Wilshire, plus one on the Westside and one in Lennox.

By December 31, 2011, the total fires of the arson spree reached 39 and the Los Angeles City Fire Department (LAFD) held a press conference the next day where the force indicated its resolve to deal with the attacks. The number of fires eventually reached 55 on January 2, the day suspect Harry Burkhart was arrested. According to the LAFD "45 occurred in the Los Angeles area, another nine were in West Hollywood, and one was in Burbank."

== Suspect's background ==
Harry Burkhart was born in Grozny in Chechnya but traveled on German documents, as a German citizen. The German embassy in Ottawa said Harry's mother, Dorothee Burkhart, has been wanted by authorities in Frankfurt and Düsseldorf since 2005. While detained in Germany, Dorothee claimed heart problems and an appointment was made for her to visit a cardiology clinic. She was allowed to wear civilian clothes and while at the clinic asked to use the washroom. Her handcuffs were removed and while in the washroom she escaped through a window. She called Harry to tell him to bring money and documents to her after which they fled Frankfurt, traveling through France to Amsterdam where they purchased airline tickets to Canada.

The Burkharts filed refugee claims in Canada, saying "we are persecuted [in Germany] because of our [Chechen] origin, nationality, disability of my son from the Nazis and their sympathizers," however the claims were denied. The minister of citizenship and immigration personally intervened in the Burkharts' case and requested that they be barred from refugee protection. The refugee claim was denied in 2009 and denied again by Canada's federal courts in 2010.

Immigration officials believed Harry Burkhart was in the United States on a visa that was due to expire within two weeks of his arrest, but they could not find a visa file for Dorothee Burkhart. The government later said that it believed that Dorothee had entered illegally. Court documents identified her as a German national and although she described herself as "Canadian German", she spoke broken German and at a previous hearing had been granted a Russian interpreter.

On January 4, 2012, German prosecutors told the Associated Press that Harry Burkhart was a suspect in an October 2011 fire in Germany that burned a home owned by his family, and that Burkhart had filed an insurance claim on the home.

=== Arrest ===
State Department Special Agent Jonathan Lamb and his partner Deputy U.S. Marshal Louis Flores were assigned the fugitive cold case of locating Dorothee Burkhart, who was wanted by Germany on 19 counts of fraud "committed on a commercial basis and as a member of a gang", including failing to pay for a 2004 breast-augmentation surgery and pilfering $45,000 worth of security deposits from renters. While working on Dorothee's case Lamb and Flores learned about her son Harry. After Dorothee was found and appeared at her extradition proceeding on December 29, 2011, Harry called further attention to himself by screaming "F*** the United States!" in the courtroom when he realized his mother was about to be deported to Germany. Prosecutors filed the paperwork to have Dorothee extradited in February and scheduled another extradition hearing for May 9, 2012.

Flores was sitting at home watching TV at about 10 p.m. on January 1 when a parking garage security camera video was played on the news. Flores recognized Harry in the video and called the LAPD hotline and his chain of command. On January 2 Los Angeles County Sheriff's Reserve Deputy Shervin Lalezary arrested Burkhart near a drugstore at the corner of Sunset Boulevard and Fairfax Avenue, having spotted him driving a blue minivan consistent with the description provided by Lamb and Flores.

== Court proceedings ==
On January 4, 2012, Los Angeles County prosecutors charged Harry Burkhart with 28 felony counts of arson of property and nine counts of arson of an inhabited structure in connection with the Los Angeles-area fires. His bail was set at $2.85 million. If convicted on all 37 counts, Burkhart could be facing up to a 341-year sentence. The district attorney's office has noted that its likely to file further charges against Burkhart. That same day, an anonymous law enforcement official said that Burkhart had been put on a suicide watch.

On January 23, 2012, prosecutors added 63 new charges and the judge reset his bail to $7.5 million. Harry Burkhart pleaded not guilty to 100 counts of arson.

Burkhart has been in custody for more than two years without trial. On March 11, 2015, he was indicted by a grand jury on 49 counts of arson, arson of inhabited buildings and possession of flammable materials.

=== Trial ===
Burkhart's trial began on August 15, 2016. He pled not guilty by reason of insanity and not guilty. He was found guilty on September 1, 2016, of all 49 counts.

After his conviction, a mistrial was declared during the insanity phase (where jurors are supposed to decide if Burkhart was sane or insane during the crimes) on September 16, 2016. Eight members of the 12-member jury thought Burkhart was insane. The next court date is October 13, 2016.

On March 5, 2018, after deliberating for five hours, a Downtown Los Angeles jury found him sane at the time of the arson.
