= Guido Burkard =

Swiss physicist

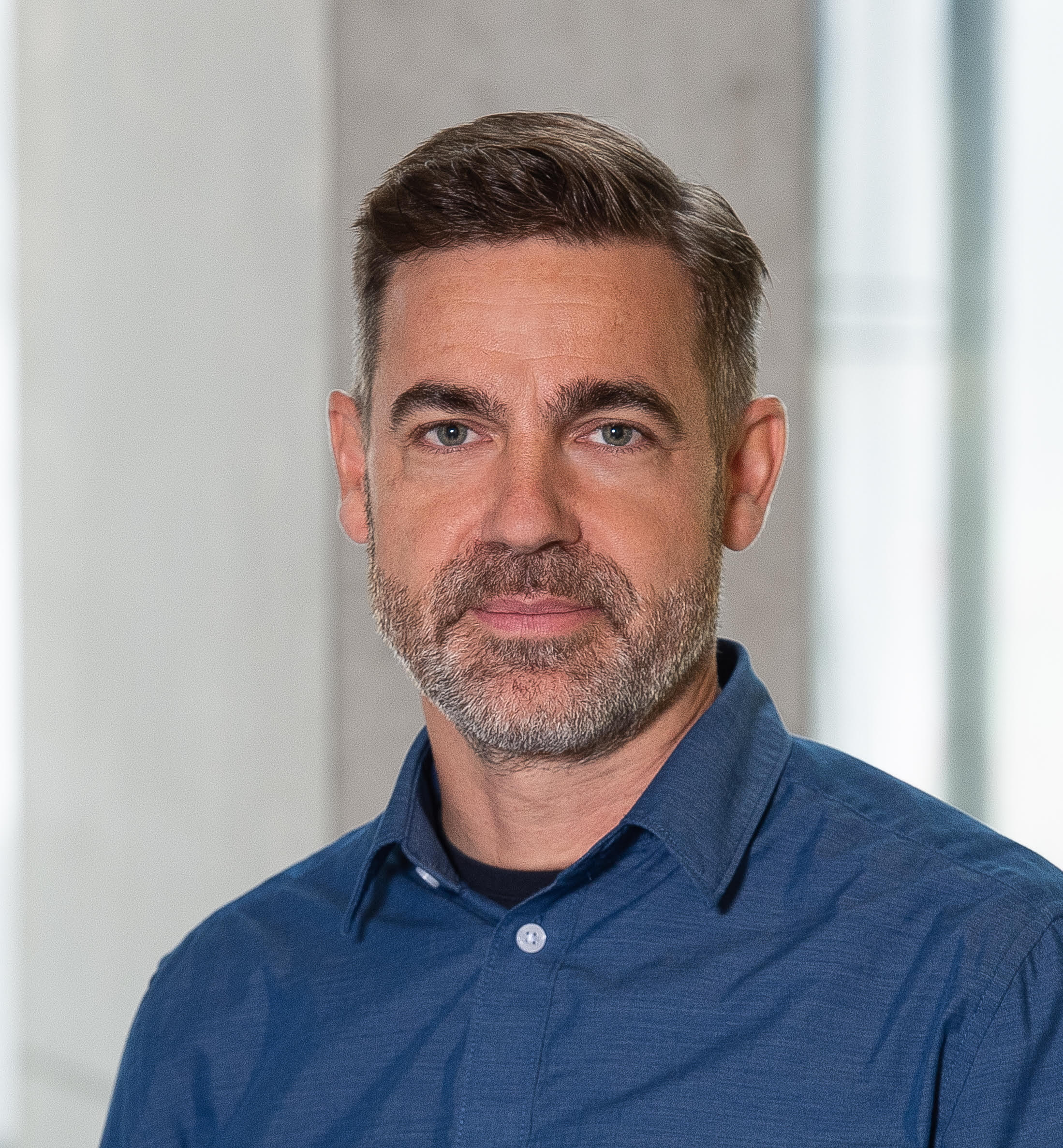
- Born: Baar, Switzerland
- Education: Swiss Federal Institute of Technology; University of Basel
- Scientific career
- Institutions: RWTH Aachen University; University of Basel; University of Konstanz
- Doctoral advisor: Daniel Loss

Guido Burkard is a Swiss physicist specializing in condensed-matter theory and quantum information. He is a full professor at the University of Konstanz, Germany, a position he has held since 2008.

== Education ==
Burkard academic background includes a degree in physics from the Swiss Federal Institute of Technology (ETH) in Zurich and a Ph.D. from the University of Basel in 2001.

== Career and research work ==
Burkard was a faculty member at RWTH Aachen University, Germany, and served as an SNF assistant professor at the University of Basel. He also completed a postdoctoral fellowship at the IBM Thomas J. Watson Research Center in Yorktown Heights, New York.

His research focuses on the theory of solid-state qubits and hybrid quantum systems, contributing to advancements in quantum information science. Burkard proposed methods to perform quantum gate operations on spin qubits and couple spin qubits to photons.

In 2024, the American Physical Society elected him as one of its Fellows.

Burkard has contributed to academic publishing as a member of the editorial board for Materials for Quantum Technology and previously served on the editorial board for Scientific Reports. He was also a Coordinating Founding Editor for Quantum. He is currently a Member of the editorial board of PRX Quantum.
