= Will Burkart =

American stand-up comedian

- Born: Peoria, Illinois, U.S.
- Education: DePaul University

Comedy career
- Years active: 2014–present
- Medium: Stand-up; social media
- Website: thewillburkart.com

Will Burkart is an American stand-up comedian known for his crowd work and short-form comedy videos. After developing a following through clips of his stand-up performances on social media, he began touring nationally in 2023. He later performed at the 2024 Netflix Is a Joke festival and released his debut stand-up special, Warm Regards, in 2025.

== Early life ==
Burkart was born in Peoria, Illinois, and grew up in the San Francisco Bay Area. He later studied film at DePaul University in Chicago, where he graduated cum laude with a B.A. in digital cinema in 2015.

He launched his stand-up career while training at the Second City during college. After completing school, Burkart moved to Los Angeles to pursue stand-up comedy.

== Career ==
=== Stand-up and social media ===
Burkart began performing stand-up comedy in 2014. He spent several years performing in the Los Angeles comedy scene before gaining a larger audience through social media. During the COVID-19 pandemic, when live comedy performances were disrupted, he increasingly posted clips from his stand-up sets online. His crowd-work videos in particular attracted a substantial following.

In 2023, Burkart embarked on his first nationwide headlining tour, performing in 45 cities. He continued touring in 2024 and appeared as a headliner at the Netflix is a Joke comedy festival in Los Angeles.

Burkart's comedy incorporates observational material and audience interaction. He has said that he generally avoids political material in his stand-up, preferring comedy that does not require an audience to share a particular political viewpoint.

In September 2025, a video of Burkart interacting with National Hockey League player Reilly Smith during a performance in Las Vegas went viral after Burkart initially failed to recognise him.

=== Podcast and Warm Regards ===
In 2023, Burkart launched The Will Burkart Podcast, a comedy podcast focusing on his experiences as a touring stand-up comedian.

Burkart recorded his first stand-up special, Warm Regards, in Sacramento, California. It was released on June 16, 2025. The special runs approximately 38 minutes and focuses primarily on Burkart's prepared stand-up material rather than the crowd-work clips through which he had become widely known online.

Burkart said he deliberately chose a shorter running time for his first special, believing that a roughly 40-minute programme would be more accessible to viewers encountering his stand-up for the first time.

== Comedy style ==
Burkart is particularly associated with crowd work, with clips of improvised interactions with audience members forming a significant part of his social-media presence. The San Francisco Chronicle characterised his approach as "good-natured crowd work".

Burkart has distinguished his online crowd-work material from his prepared stand-up, using short audience-interaction clips to introduce viewers to his comedy while reserving much of his written material for live performances and longer-form releases.

== Personal life ==
Burkart lives in Los Angeles.
