= Herbert Burkert =

German legal scholar

- Citizenship: Germany
- Education: University of St. Gallen
- Scientific career
- Fields: Information Law and related disciplines

Herbert Burkert is a German law professor, President of the Research Center for Information Law (FIR-HSG) at the University of St. Gallen, Switzerland. He serves on the editorial boards of Information Communication & Society, Journal of Law and Information Science, Multimedia and Law, Kluwer Law Information Series, Data protection and Data securing and Medialex. Formerly, Burkert served The European Commission's DG “Information Society” as Chairman of Legal Advisory Board and the MIT AutoID-Project (now EPC Global) as European Representative of the International Public Policy Advisory Council.
