= Urs Burkart =

Swiss ice hockey player

- Born: January 9, 1963 (age 62) Zürich, Switzerland
- Height: 6 ft 3 in (191 cm)
- Weight: 203 lb (92 kg; 14 st 7 lb)
- Position: Defence
- Played for: EHC Kloten; EV Zug
- National team: Switzerland
- Playing career: 1980–1995

Urs Burkart (born January 9, 1963) is a former Swiss professional ice hockey defenceman who played Switzerland's National League A for EHC Kloten and EV Zug.

Burkart participated as a member of the Swiss national team at the 1988 Winter Olympics.

He is currently F&ACE coordinator.
