= Martin Burckhardt (architect) =

Swiss architect and politician

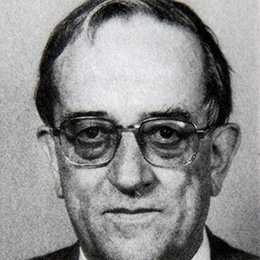
Official portrait of Martin Burckhardt, LDP National Councillor for Basel-Stadt

Martin Burckhardt, born on 5 March 1921 in Basel and died on 6 February 2007 in the same city, was a Swiss architect and politician, member of the Liberal Democratic Party. He was a member of the National Council from 1987 to 1991.

He is the architect of the Tower of the Bank for International Settlements in Basel.

== Biography ==
=== Family and background ===
Martin Heinrich Burckhardt, also known as Burckhardt-Henrici., was born in Basel on 5 March 1921. His father was the architect Karl August Burckhardt (1879-1960), from an old Basel patrician family; his mother was Louise Elisabeth Koechlin. He was the youngest of five siblings.

In 1952, he married Veronika Henrici, the daughter of a Basel lawyer. They had two children, including the ancient historian Leonhard Burckhardt (de).

=== Studies ===
He attended school in Basel. After graduating from the Humanist Gymnasium in Basel (de) in 1940, he studied architecture at the Swiss Federal Institute of Technology in Zurich, graduating in 1945. He then spent several years in the United States, in New York and Houston.

=== Career ===
Returning to Switzerland in 1951, he founded Burckhardt Architekten in Basel (Burckhardt+Partner since 1973) with his father and his partner Karl Eckert. From 1970 onwards, he was also a lecturer and, from 1979 to 1982, a professor at EPF in Lausanne. In the 1950s and 1960s, the office established itself with numerous administrative and industrial buildings, particularly for the chemical industry and the banking sector. The office was able to open branches in Berlin, Vienna, Paris, Mexico, Brazil, the United States and Australia, among others. He left the management of Burckhardt+Partner in 1990. In 2006, the office was Switzerland's largest architectural firm, with a staff of 219.

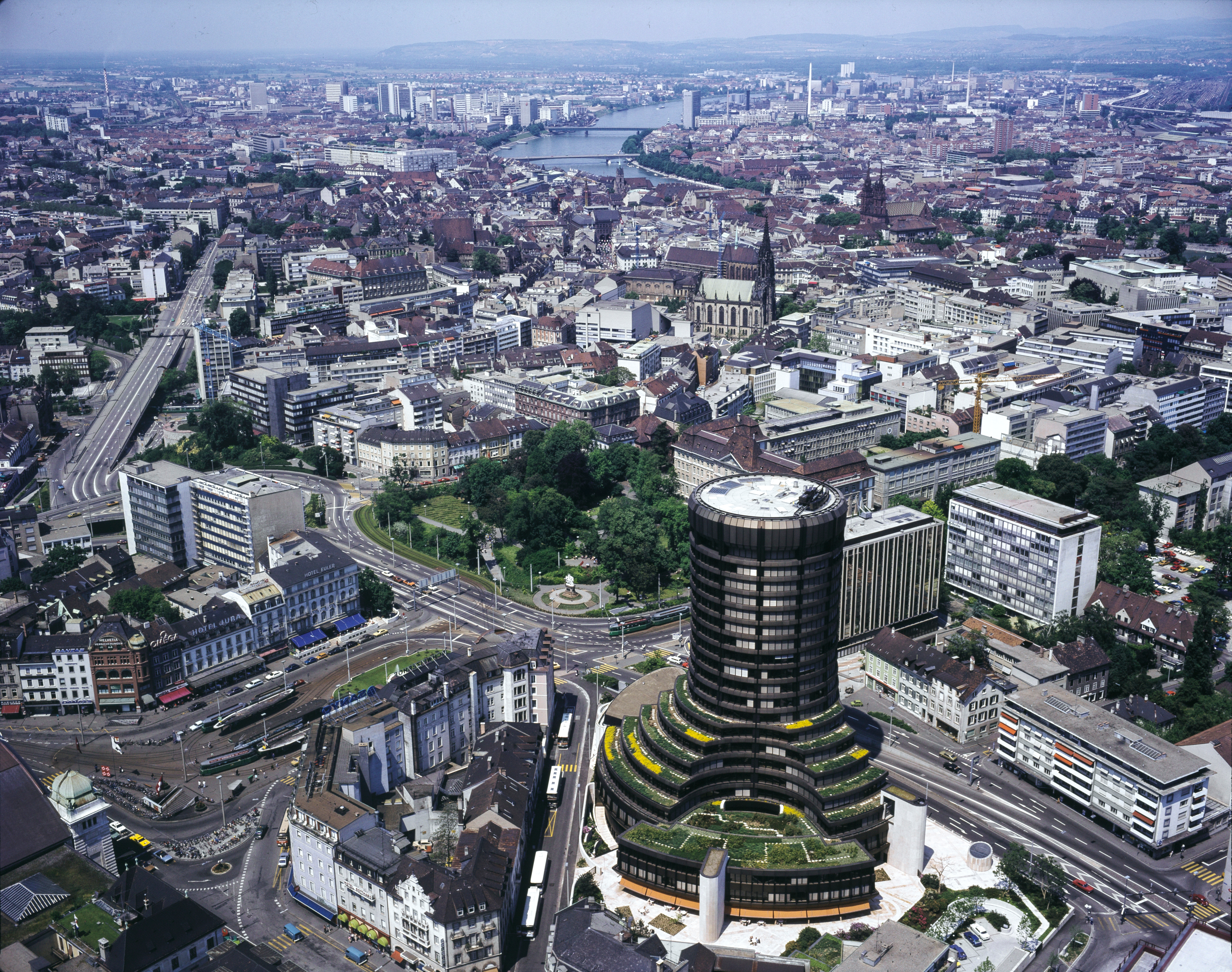
Basel: the Bank for International Settlements Tower, the Old Town and the Rhine.

Martin Burckhardt built the Biozentrum inter-faculty institute at the University of Basel from 1967 to 1970, the BIS-Tower of the Bank for International Settlements from 1972 to 1976 and the Nestlé Research Centre in Lausanne from 1980 to 19872.

In 1968, he designed the Sandoz-France headquarters in Rueil-Malmaison, in collaboration with Bernard Zehrfuss, assisted by Jean Prouvé.

=== Politics ===
From 1984 to 1988, he was chairman of the Basel section of the Liberal Democratic Party.

From 1976 to 1988 he was a member of the Grand Council of Basel-Stadt and from 1987 to 1991 a member of the Swiss National Council, where he was particularly involved in the areas of education, culture and foreign policy. He was a member of the parliamentary reform committee and the committee for the 1992 World Expo in Seville.

=== Art and patronage ===
Martin Burckhardt was a member of the Basel Cantonal Art Commission from 1955 to 1975.

In 1961, in memory of his father, he created the Karl August Burckhardt-Koechlin Fund to acquire 20th-century drawings, watercolours and gouaches for the Prints and Drawings Department of Basel's Kunstmuseum.

The collection includes works by : Otmar Alto, Marguerite Ammann, Horst Antès, Julius Bissier, Umberto Boccioni, Walter Bodmer, Eduardo Chillida, Simon Dittrich, Max Ernst, Maurice Estève, Lyonel Feininger, Paul Flore, Alberto Giacometti, Giovanni Giacometti, Juan Gris, Horst Janssen, Lenz Klotz, Bernhard Luginbühl, Otto Meyer-Amden, Amedeo Modigliani, Robert Muller, Antonio Zoran Musique, Luigi Pericle, Pablo Picasso, Serge Poliakoff, Oskar Schlemmer, K. R.H. Sonderborg, Louis Soutter and Antonio Tàpies

This fund is managed by the Freiwillige Akademische Gesellschaft (FAG).

== Works (selection) ==
=== Architecture ===
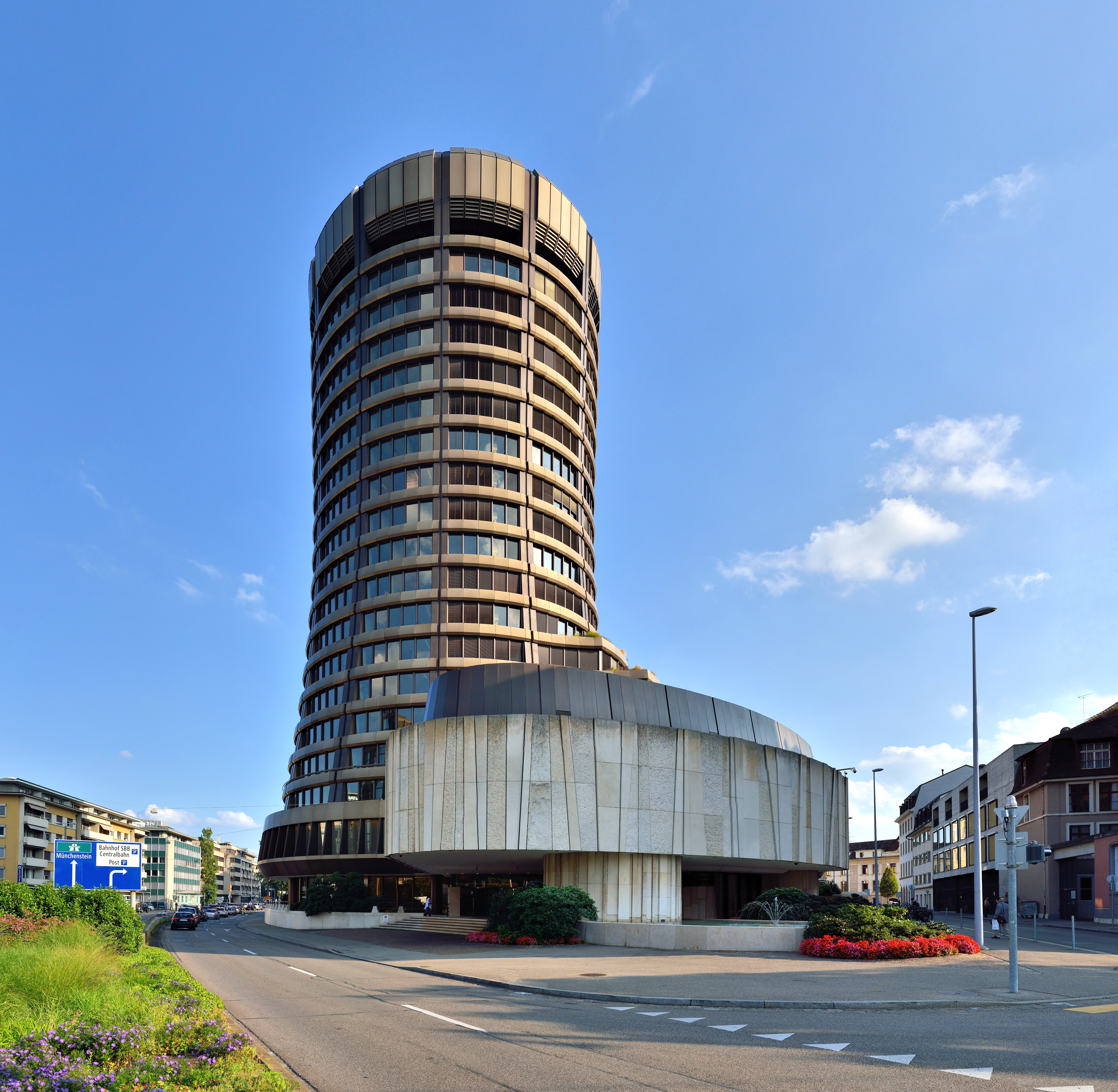
Basel - Tower of the Bank for International Settlements

- Verwaltungsgebäude und Kantine, Geigy, Werk Rosental, Basel, 1954–66
- Warenhaus Pfauen, Coop, Basel, 1959–63
- Wasserstelzenschulhaus, Riehen, 1961–1964
- Fabrikations- und Lagergebäude, Thomi und Franck, Horburg, 1963–67
- Bürogebäude, Burckhardt Architekten, Basel, 1962–62
- Soleeindampfungsanlage, Rheinsalinen Schweizerhalle, Pratteln, 1965–66
- Hauptsitz Sandoz-France, Paris, Frankreich, 1965–68
- Hauptsitz Sandoz, São Paulo, Brasilien, 1965–68
- Aquarium und Vivarium, Zoologischer Garten Basel, 1967–69
- Laborgebäude Pharma und Farben, Sandoz, Basel, 1967–71
- Forschungszentrum Sandoz, Wien, 1967–70
- Biozentrum, Universität Basel, 1967–70
- Bürogebäude Sandoz, Barcelona, 1969–70
- Bank für Internationalen Zahlungsausgleich BIZ, Basel, 1972–76
- Forschungszentrum Nestlé Nahrungsmittel, Vers-chez-les-Blanc VD, 1980–87
- Verwaltungsgebäude Schweizerischer Bankverein, Basel, 1980–88
- Modehaus Spengler, Münchenstein, 1988–91
- Erweiterungsgebäude Universität Zürich, 3. und 4. Etappe, 1989–94, 1992–97
- Informatikgebäude R-1008 der Ciba-Geigy, Basel 1989–91
- Alters- und Pflegeheim Schöntal, Füllinsdorf 1990–91
- Bogn Engiadina, Therme, Scuols 1990–92
- Bürogebäude Hatt-Haller AG, Dietikon 1991–94
- Radio Studio, Zürich, Um- und Neubau 1992–94
- Verwaltungsgebäude Basler Lebensversicherung, 1993–94
- Leonhard-Schulhaus, Basel 1995–98

=== Literature ===
M. H. Burckhardt, Baulust, autopublishing, 2000, Bâle (Mémoires).

== Bibliography ==
- Dorothee Huber: Burckhard und Partner. In: Isabelle Rucki und Dorothee Huber (Hrsg.): Architektenlexikon der Schweiz – 19./20. Jahrhundert. Birkhäuser, Basel 1998. ISBN 3-7643-5261-2. S. 105
- Christian Felber: Ein Architekt und Mäzen alter Schule. In: Basler Stadtbuch 2007, S. 107–108.
