= Burkard Wilhelm Leist =

German jurist (1819–1906)

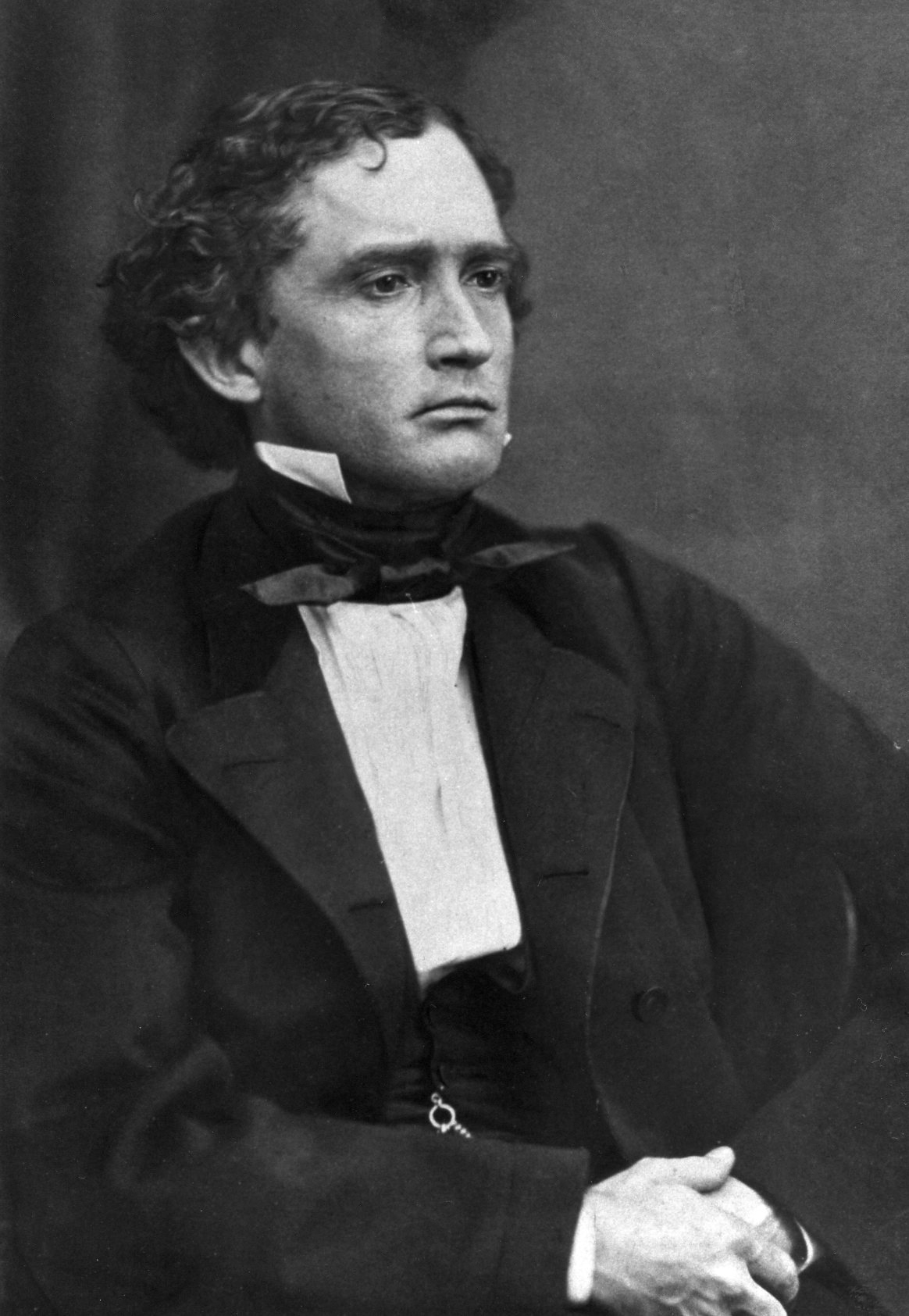
- Born: July 12, 1819; Westen, Electorate of Hanover
- Died: December 31, 1906 (aged 87); Jena, German Empire
- Education: Universities of Göttingen, Heidelberg, and Berlin
- Occupations: Jurist, professor
- Known for: Research on Roman law and Indo-Germanic law

Burkard Wilhelm Leist (12 July 1819 in Westen – 31 December 1906 in Jena) was a German jurist.

== Biography ==
He studied at Göttingen, Heidelberg and Berlin. He was appointed professor of civil law at Basel in 1846, at Rostock in 1847, and from 1853 he filled that chair at the University of Jena. He was a pupil of Gustav Hugo and of Savigny. He combined the historical method with analysis. After studies on the fundamental material of law, especially Roman law, he did valuable research in the hypothetical field of Indo-Germanic law.

== Works ==
Among his works were:

- Die Bonorum Possessio, ihre geschichtliche Entwickelung und heutige Geltung (1844–48)
- Versuche einer Geschichte der römischen Rechtssysteme (1850)
- Civilistische Studien auf dem Gebiet dogmatischer Analyse (1854–77)
- Mancipation und Eigentumstradition (1865)
- Der römische Erbrechtsbesitz (1871)
- Altarisches Jus Gentium (1889)
- Altarisches Jus Civile (1892–96)
