= Burkhart Waldecker =

German explorer (1902–1964)

Burkhart Waldecker (August 19, 1902, in Hagen – 1964) was a German explorer who, in 1937, discovered the most southern source of the White Nile in Burundi. Waldecker came to the area to seek asylum from Nazi persecution. The true source is near Rutovu, where a pyramid was erected in 1938. Waldecker's name is seen on the plaque, which says in Latin, "Caput Nili," thus ending man's long quest to discover the source. Although the Nile river has various sources, Waldecker found the White Nile's most southern source which is part of the Kagera River, the other being Lake Kyoga in Uganda further north. The small pipe flowing with the first Nile water appears from the ground below the summit of Mount Kikizi where the pyramid is found.

The explorer missionary David Livingstone tried for many years in the late 1800s to find the source of the Nile without success.
