= Burkert =

Burkert is a surname. Notable people with the surname include:

- Nancy Ekholm Burkert (born 1933), American artist and illustrator
- Marianne Burkert-Eulitz (born 1972), German politician
- Martin Burkert (born 1964), German politician
- Rudolf Burkert (1904–1985), German Czechoslovak Nordic skier
- Karel Burkert (1909–1991), Czech football goalkeeper
- Walter Burkert (1931–2015), German scholar
- Herbert Burkert, German law professor
