= Burghardt Wittig =

German molecular biologist (born 1947)

Burghardt Wittig (born 1947 in Celle, Germany) is the chairman of MolBio^{2}Math and a professor of biochemistry and molecular biology at Freie Universitaet Berlin in Berlin (FUB), Germany. His research focuses on the areas of gene regulation, DNA structures induced by torsional strain, chromatin structure, G-protein-mediated signal transduction, as well as therapeutic applications of genetic research and DNA-based vaccines. His research has been published in numerous leading scientific journals, including Cell, Nature, PNAS, and Science.

== Early life ==
Wittig was born in Celle, Germany, where he attended the classical "Gymnasium Ernestinum". He graduated by the German Abitur in fall 1966, followed by two years of service in the German military.

== Career and research ==
Wittig enrolled at Freie Universitaet Berlin in 1968 to study medicine. While attending medical school, he also received training as an engineer specialised in hearing aids (audiologist) and graduated by the German Gesellenpruefung. During his time as a medical student at Freie Universitaet Berlin, Wittig joined laboratories at the Institute of Molecular Biology and Biochemistry and at the Max Planck Institute for Molecular Genetics to conduct the experiments for his MD thesis. He was principally mentored by Hubert Gottschling but received further advice from V.A. Erdmann, O. Pongs, H.-J. Risse, H. Tiedemann and H.G. Wittmann as well. Having concluded his medical studies in 1975, Wittig successfully defended his thesis on "Purification and Characterisation of the Four Lysine-Specific Transfer Ribonucleic Acids from Chicken Embryos" (German: Reinigung und Charakterisierung der vier lysinspezifischen Transfer-Ribonukleinsäuren aus Hühnerembyronen) in 1976. He stayed at Freie Universitaet as a postdoc until 1978, and as an assistant professor from 1978 to 1987.

From 1976 to 1986, Wittig attended a variety of physics courses in addition to his principal work as a researcher. These classes led him as a visiting student to Technische Universitaet Berlin, California Institute of Technology (Caltech) and Massachusetts Institute of Technology (MIT). He received no official degree for these courses.

In 1980, Wittig habilitated for "Biochemistry and Molecular Biology" and became thus formally eligible for a full professorship in Germany. For the 1982/83 cycle, Wittig was awarded a Heisenberg scholarship of the Deutsche Forschungsgemeinschaft; he continued to work as a fellow of the programme until 1989. During this time, he spent time at the labs of Edward Trifonov at the Weizmann Institute of Science, Rehovot, and Koki Horikoshi, at Riken.

From 1984 to 1986, Wittig worked as a visiting professor at Alexander Rich's lab at MIT, where he also cooperated with Alexander Varshavsky. Wittig would later describe these years as "the most career-shaping of [his] life".

In 1987, Freie Universitaet Berlin awarded Wittig an extraordinary professorship. He continued to work as a visiting professor at Alexander Rich's lab until 1989, when he became a Schering professor (S-C4, full tenure) at Freie Universitaet Berlin. In 1988, he became the fully tenured founding chair and department head of Molecular Biology and Bioinformatics at Freie Universitaet's Institute of Molecular Biology and Biochemistry. After a change of the relevant laws of the state of Berlin merged parts of Freie Universitaet and Humboldt Universitaet into the Charité – Universitaetsmedizin, Wittig became director of its newly founded Institute of Molecular Biology and Bioinformatics.

Beginning in 1994, Wittig focused his research on the design, development, and clinical proof-of-concept of covalently closed DNA constructs for the treatment of cancer and for DNA-vaccines against infectious diseases. Two classes of DNA-molecules evolved through theoretical and experimental selection processes and became key technologies; MIDGE (minimalistic, immunogenically defined gene expression), and dSLIM for DNA-based immunomodulation.

Guided by the goal of facilitating the independent transition from basic research into clinical DNA-based medicines, Wittig founded Mologen AG in 1998. The firm had their IPO at the German stock exchange in the same year. He served as Mologen AG's CEO until 2007, while continuing to work as a full professor in a private-public-partnership.

In 2010, Wittig's institute returned to Freie Universitaet Berlin as a non-profit foundation with Freie Universitaet as the trustee. He served as the chairman of this newly created Foundation Institute of Molecular Biology and Bioinformatics until 2017.

In late 2019, Wittig founded MolBio^{2}Math, a non-profit foundation under the trusteeship of the Gentechnologiestiftung - Dr. Georg und Ingeburg Scheel Stiftung, of which he is currently the chairman

== Selected publications ==
- Wittig, B; Reuter, S; Gottschling, H (1973). "Purification of the four lysine specific transfer ribonucleic acids from chick embryos". Biochim. Biophys. Acta. 331 (2): 221–230. doi:10.1016/0005-2787(73)90435-8. PMID 4774407.
- Allfrey VG, Arnott S, Bradbury EM, Bayev A, Chambon P, Crick FHC, Felsenfeld G, Mirzabekov AT, Noll M, Stern H, van Holde KE, Wittig B, Zachau HG, and Zweidler A (1976) "The Structure of Chromatin" in: Organization and expression of chromosomes: Dahlem Konferenzen Life Sciences Research Report, 4; Allfrey AG, Bautz EKF, McCarthy BJ, Schimke RT, Tissieres A (Eds.) pp. 19–27; ISBN 3820012052 / ISBN 9783820012057, Abakon Verlagsgesellschaft, Berlin.
- Wittig, B; Wittig, S (1979). "A phase relationship associates tRNA structural gene sequences with nucleosome cores". Cell. 18 (4): 1173–1183. doi:10.1016/0092-8674(79)90230-7. PMID 519765. S2CID 8811309.
- Wittig, B; Wittig, S (1982). "Function of a tRNA gene promoter depends on nucleosome position". Nature. 297 (5861): 31–38. Bibcode:1982Natur.297...31W. doi:10.1038/297031a0. PMID 7070532. S2CID 4247235.
- Wittig, B; Dorbic, T; Rich, A (1991). ""Transcription is associated with Z-DNA formation in metabolically active, permeabilized mammalian cell nuclei"(PDF)". Proc. Natl. Acad. Sci. USA. 88 (6): 2259–2263. Bibcode:1991PNAS...88.2259W. doi:10.1073/pnas.88.6.2259. PMC 51210. PMID 2006166.
- Kleuss, C; Hescheler, J; Ewel, C; Rosenthal, W; Schultz, G; Wittig, B (1991). "Assignment of G-protein subtypes to specific receptors inducing inhibition of calcium currents". Nature. 353 (6339): 43–48. Bibcode:1991Natur.353...43K. doi:10.1038/353043a0. PMID 1679199. S2CID 4238414.
- Kleuss, C; Scherübl, H; Hescheler, J; Schultz, G; Wittig, B (1993). "Selectivity in signal transduction determined by gamma subunits of heterotrimeric G proteins". Science. 259 (832–834): 832–4. Bibcode:1993Sci...259..832K. doi:10.1126/science.8094261. PMID 8094261.
- Müller, V; Takeya, M; Brendel, S; Wittig, B; Rich, A (1996). "Z-DNA forming sites within the human b-globin gene cluster". Proc. Natl. Acad. Sci. USA. 93 (2): 780–784. Bibcode:1996PNAS...93..780M. doi:10.1073/pnas.93.2.780. PMC 40132. PMID 8570634.
- Möller, P; Sun, Y; Dorbic, T; Alijagic, S; Makki, A; Jurgovsky, K; Schroff, M; Henz, BM; Wittig, B; Schadendorf, D (1998). "Vaccination with IL-7 gene-modified autologous melanoma cells can enhance the anti-melanoma lytic activity in peripheral blood of patients with a good clinical performance status: a clinical phase I study". British Journal of Cancer. 77 (11): 1907–1916. doi:10.1038/bjc.1998.317. PMC 2150323. PMID 9667667.
- Wittig, B; Märten, A; Dorbic, T; Weineck, S; Min, H; Niemitz, S; Trojaneck, B; Flieger, D; Kruopis, S; Albers, A; Löffel, J; Neubauer, A; Albers, P; Müller, S; Sauerbruch, T; Bieber, T; Huhn, D; Schmidt-Wolf, IGH (2001). "Therapeutic vaccination against metastatic carcinoma by expression-modulated and immunomodified autologous tumor cells: A first clinical Phase I/II trial". Human Gene Therapy. 12 (3): 267–278. doi:10.1089/10430340150218404. PMID 11177563.
- López-Fuertes, L; Pérez-Jiménez, E; Vila-Coro, AJ; Sack, F; Moreno, S; Konig, SA; Junghans, C; Wittig, B; Timón, M; Esteban, M (2002). "DNA vaccination with linear minimalistic (MIDGE) vectors confers protection against Leishmania major infection in mice". Vaccine. 21 (3–4): 247–57. doi:10.1016/s0264-410x(02)00450-4. PMID 12450700.
- Weihrauch, MR; Ansen, S; Jurkiewicz, E; Geisen, C; Xia, Z; Anderson, KS; Gracien, E; Schmidt, M; Wittig, B; Diehl, V; Wolf, J; Bohlen, H; Nadler, LM (2005). "Phase I/II combined chemoimmunotherapy with carcinoembryonic antigen-derived HLA-A2-restricted CAP-1 peptide and irinotecan, 5-fluorouracil, and leucovorin in patients with primary metastatic colorectal cancer". Clin Cancer Res. 11 (16): 5993–6001. doi:10.1158/1078-0432.ccr-05-0018. PMID 16115944. S2CID 11221907.
- Kneipp, J; Kneipp, H; Wittig, B; Kneipp, K (2007). "One- and two-photon excited optical ph probing for cells using surface-enhanced Raman and hyper-Raman nanosensors". Nano Lett. 7 (9): 2819–23. Bibcode:2007NanoL...7.2819K. doi:10.1021/nl071418z. PMID 17696561.
- Endmann, A; Baden, M; Weisermann, E; Kapp, K; Schroff, M; Kleuss, C; Wittig, B; Juhls, C (2010). "Immune response induced by a linear DNA vector: Influence of dose, formulation and route of injection". Vaccine. 28 (21): 3642–9. doi:10.1016/j.vaccine.2010.03.034. PMID 20362204.
- Kapp, K; Kleuss, C; Schroff, M; Wittig, B (2014). "Genuine Immunomodulation With dSLIM". Mol Ther Nucleic Acids. 3 (6): e170. doi:10.1038/mtna.2014.28. PMC 4078763. PMID 24959843.
- Wittig, B; Schmidt, M; Scheithauer, W; Schmoll, HJ (2015). "MGN1703, an immunomodulator and toll-like receptor 9 (TLR-9) agonist: From bench to bedside". Crit Rev Oncol Haematol. 94 (1): 31–44. doi:10.1016/j.critrevonc.2014.12.002. PMID 25577571.
- Volz, B; Schmidt, M; Heinrich, K; Kapp, K; Schroff, M; Wittig, B (2015). "Design and characterization of the tumor vaccine MGN1601, allogeneic fourfold gene-modified vaccine cells combined with a TLR-9 agonist". Mol Ther Oncolytics. 3 15023. doi:10.1038/mto.2015.23. PMC 4824560. PMID 27119114.
- Zhang, S.; Wittig, B. (2015). "Alexander Rich: 1924–2015". Nature Biotechnology. 33 (6): 593–598. doi:10.1038/nbt.3262. PMID 26057974. S2CID 562909.
- Vibholm, L; Schleimann, MH; Højen, JF; Benfield, T; Offersen, R; Rasmussen, K; Olesen, R; Dige, A; Agnholt, J; Grau, J; Buzon, M; Wittig, B; Lichterfeld, M; Petersen, AM; Deng, X; Abdel-Mohsen, M; Pillai, SK; Rutsaert, S; Trypsteen, W; De Spiegelaere, W; Vandekerchove, L; Østergaard, L; Rasmussen, T; Denton, PW; Tolstrup, M; Søgaard, OS (2017). "Short-Course Toll-Like Receptor 9 Agonist Treatment Impacts Innate Immunity and Plasma Viremia in Individuals With Human Immunodeficiency Virus Infection". Clin Infect Dis. 64 (12): 1686–1695. doi:10.1093/cid/cix201. PMC 5849129. PMID 28329286.
- Krarup, AR; Abdel-Mohsen, M; Schleimann, MH; Vibholm, L; Engen, PA; Dige, A; Wittig, B; Schmidt, M; Green, SJ; Naqib, A; Keshavarzian, A; Deng, X; Olesen, R; Petersen, AM; Benfield, T; Østergaard, L; Rasmussen, TA; Agnholt, J; Nyengaard, JR; Landay, A; Søgaard, OS; Pillai, SK; Tolstrup, M; Denton, PW (2018). "The TLR9 agonist MGN1703 triggers a potent type I interferon response in the sigmoid colon". Mucosal Immunol. 11 (2): 449–461. doi:10.1038/mi.2017.59. PMC 5796873. PMID 28766555.
- Thomas, M; Ponce-Aix, S; Navarro, A; Riera-Knorrenschild, J; Schmidt, M; Wiegert, E; Kapp, K; Wittig, B; Mauri, C; Dómine Gómez, M; Kollmeier, J; Sadjadian, P; Fröhling, K-P; Huber, RM; Wolf, M (2018). "Immunotherapeutic maintenance treatment with toll-like receptor 9 agonist lefitolimod in patients with extensive-stage small cell lung cancer: results from the exploratory, controlled, randomized, international phase II IMPULSE study". Annals of Oncology. 29 (10): 2076–2084. doi:10.1093/annonc/mdy326. PMC 6225892. PMID 30137193.
- Kapp, K; Volz, B; Oswald, D; Wittig, B; Baumann, M; Schmidt, M (2019). "Beneficial modulation of the tumor microenvironment and generation of anti-tumor responses by TLR9 agonist lefitolimod alone and in combination with checkpoint inhibitors". OncoImmunology. 8 (12) e1659096. doi:10.1080/2162402X.2019.1659096. PMC 6844329. PMID 31741757. S2CID 203820145.
- Schleimann, MH; Kobberø, ML; Vibholm, LK; Kjær, K; Giron, LB; Busman-Sahay, K; Chan, CN; Nekorchuk, M; Schmidt, M; Wittig, B; Damsgaard, TE; Ahlburg, P; Hellfritzsch, MB; Zuwala, K; Rothemejer, FH; Olesen, R; Schommers, P; Klein, F; Dweep, H; Kossenkov, A; Nyengaard, JR; Estes, JD; Abdel-Mohsen, M; Østergaard, L; Tolstrup, M; Søgaard, OS; Denton, PW (2019). "TLR9 agonist MGN1703 enhances B cell differentiation and function in lymph nodes". eBioMedicine. 45: 328–340. doi:10.1016/j.ebiom.2019.07.005. PMC 6642412. PMID 31300344.
- Schmidt M, Schroff M, Wittig B (2020) "Harnessing the Therapeutic Potential of Dendritic Cells" in: Second Generation Cell and Gene-based Therapies, pp. 183–202; Alain A. Vertès, Devyn M. Smith, Nasib Qureshi, Nathan J. Dowden (Eds.) ISBN 978-0-12-812034-7, Academic Press, London
- O'Halloran, J. A.; et al. (2022). "Infliximab for Treatment of Adults Hospitalized with Moderate or Severe Covid-19". medRxiv 10.1101/2022.09.22.22280245.
