= Burchard (name) =

- Pronunciation: /ˈ/
- Gender: Male

Origin
- Origin: Germanic
- Meaning: ""
- Region of origin: Europe

Other names
- Popularity: see popular names

Burchard (Bouchard, Burchardt, Burckhart, Burkhart, Burkard, Burkhard, Burkert, Borchardt, Burckhardt and variants, Old English Burgheard) are both Germanic given names and surnames, from Burg "castle" and hart "hard". Notable people with the name include:

== Given name ==
Burchard

- Burchard of Würzburg, an 8th-century Anglo-Saxon missionary to the Frankish Empire
- Burchard I, Duke of Swabia (c. 855/860–911)
- Burchard II, Duke of Swabia (c. 883 – 926)
- Burchard III, Duke of Swabia (c. 915 – 973)
- Burchard, Duke of Thuringia (died 908)
- Burchard of Worms (c. 950 – 1025), theologian
- Burchard (archbishop of Vienne) (died 1031)
- Burchard (bishop of Aosta) (died 1068), also Archbishop of Lyon (1033–1034), under the name Burchard III
- Burchard II, Bishop of Halberstadt, 11th-century German cleric and statesman
- Burchard of Basle, 11th-century bishop of Basle
- Burchard of Istria (died 1106/1107)
- Burchard, Bishop of Utrecht, 11th/12th century
- Burchard (fl. 1150–1195), second abbot of St. John's Abbey in the Thurtal, see Berchtold of Engelberg
- Burchard of Mount Sion, 13th-century traveler to the Middle East

Burghard

- Burghard Freiherr von Schorlemer-Alst (1825–1895), Prussian parliamentarian

Burghardt

- Burghardt Wittig (born 1947), German chairman and professor of biochemistry and molecular biology

Burkhard

Burkhardt

- Burkhardt Öller (1942–2014), German football goalkeeper

Burkhart

- Burkhart Waldecker (1902–1964), German explorer

Burkard

- Burkard Polster (born 1965), mathematician

== Surname ==
Borchard

Borchardt

Borchert

Bouchard

Bourquard

- Claude Bourquard (1937–2011), French fencer

Burchard

- Almut Burchard, German-Canadian mathematician
- Burchard-Bélaváry family, an aristocratic family of Hungarian origin, originally called Both de Szikava et Bélavár
- Brendon Burchard (born 1977), American author and motivational speaker
- Ernst Burchard (1876–1920), German author and doctor
- Charles Burchard (1810–1879), American politician from Wisconsin
- Horatio C. Burchard (1825–1908), American politician from Illinois
- Jerry Burchard (1931–2011), American photographer, educator, and curator
- Johann Burchard, 15th-century church figure
- Johann Burchard Freystein (1671–1718), German lawyer and hymn writer
- Johann Heinrich Burchard (1852–1912), Hamburg lawyer and politician
- Oscar Burchard (1863–1949), German botanist, see List of Euphorbia species (G-O)
- Peter Burchard, author
- Petrea Burchard (born 1955), American actress
- Samuel D. Burchard (minister), American Presbyterian church leader
- Samuel D. Burchard (politician) (1836–1901), American politician from Wisconsin
- Pablo Burchard (1879–1964), Chilean painter
- Wolf Burchard (*1985), British-German art historian and museum curator

Burchardt

Burckhardt

Burgard

Burgert

Burghardt

Burkard

Burkart

Burkhard

Burkhardt

Burkhart

Burkert

== See also ==
- Burgheard
