= Burghardt =

Burghardt is a German language surname. Notable people with the surname include:

- Alexandra Burghardt (born 1994), German sprinter and bobsledder
- Anne Burghardt (born 1975), Estonian Lutheran theologian
- Arthur Burghardt (born 1947), American actor
- Anton Burghardt (1942–2022), German football player and manager
- Caroline Burghardt (1834–1922), American nurse
- Franklin Burghardt (1912–1981), American football and basketball coach
- Günter Burghardt (born 1941), German diplomat
- Jack Burghardt (1929–2002), Canadian news broadcaster and politician
- Marcus Burghardt (born 1983), German cyclist
- Mary Silvina Burghardt (1831–1885), American domestic worker
- Max Burghardt (1893–1977), German actor, director
- Otto Paul Burghardt (1875–1959), German architect
- Raymond Burghardt (born 1945), American diplomat
- Tomasz Burghardt (1965–2025), Polish Catholic priest
- William Edward Burghardt DuBois (1868–1963), American sociologist, socialist, and historian

== See also ==
- Burghardt Wittig (born 1947), German chairman and professor of biochemistry and molecular biology
- Lorenzo Burghardt, a 1918 German silent film directed by William Wauer
- Burchard (name)
