= Burckhardt (disambiguation) =

Burckhardt was the most powerful family of the canton of Basel in the 17th century and early 18th century.

Burckhardt may also refer to:

- A. E. Burckhardt House, a registered historic building in Cincinnati, Ohio, United States
- Burckhardt House, a 1+1/2-story Prairie Box style home built in Lincoln, Nebraska, in 1903
- Burckhardt Compression, Swiss compression technology enterprise
- Burckhardt (crater), a lunar impact crater that is located in the northeast part of the Moon
- Burckhardt (surname), German surname
- Burckhardt Helferich (1887–1982), German chemist
- Burckhardt Hoppe (born 1946), German former sports shooter

== See also ==
- Burchard
- Burkhardt
- Burghardt
