= Burkhardt =

Burkhardt may refer to:

== Places ==
- Burkhardt, Wisconsin, an unincorporated community in St. Croix County, Wisconsin
- Burkhardt Historic District, a district in Chesterfield, Missouri

== People ==
- Burkhardt (surname), German surname
- Burkhardt Öller (1942–2014), German football goalkeeper

== Other uses ==
- Burckhardt (crater), a lunar impact crater
- Burkhardt (grape) (also Burkhardt's Prince), a French red wine grape better known as Aramon

== See also ==
- Burchard (disambiguation)
