= Burkhardt (surname) =

Burkhardt is a German language surname. Notable people with the surname include:

- Addison Burkhardt (1879–1937), German librettist and lyricist
- Boris Burkhardt (born 1996), Dutch field and indoor hockey player
- Brandi Burkhardt (born 1979), American theatre, television, and film actress
- Bridget Burkhardt, American politician
- Christoph Burkhardt (born 1985), German cognitive psychologist, author, and artificial intelligence (AI) researcher
- Delara Burkhardt (born 1992), German politician
- Edward Burkhardt, German railroad executive
- Ethel Burkhardt Arnold, female tennis player
- Filip Burkhardt (born 1987), Polish footballer
- Florian Burkhardt (born 1974), Swiss model, author, conceptioner, graphic designer, electronic musician, and music producer
- Frederick Burkhardt (1913–2007), American educator and foundation administrator
- Hans Burkhardt (1904–1994), Swiss-American abstract expressionist artist
- Heinrich Friedrich Karl Ludwig Burkhardt (1861–1914), German mathematician
  - Burkhardt quartic, a quartic threefold in 4-dimensional projective space studied by Heinrich Burkhardt
- Hugo Burkhardt (1910–unknown), Swiss footballer
- Hugh Burkhardt (1935–2024), British theoretical physicist and educational designer
- Kevin Burkhardt (born 1974), American sportscaster
- Jacques Burkhardt (1808–1867), Swiss scientific illustrator
- Joseph Burkhardt-Born (1873–1952), Swiss painter
- Marcin Burkhardt (born 1983), Polish footballer
- Martha Burkhardt (1874–1956), Swiss painter
- Richard W. Burkhardt (1918–2014), the 8th President of Ball State University
- Robert J. Burkhardt (1916–1999), American Democratic Party politician
- Theodor Burkhardt (1905–1958), German international footballer
- Thorsten Burkhardt (born 1981), German footballer
- Vivian Burkhardt (born 1986), Grenadian model and beauty pageant

== Fictional ==
- Nick Burkhardt, fictional Grimm character

== See also ==
- Burkhardt (disambiguation)
- Burghardt
- Burkhardt Öller (1942–2014), German football goalkeeper
- Burchard (name)
