= Carrington (crater) =

Crater on the Moon

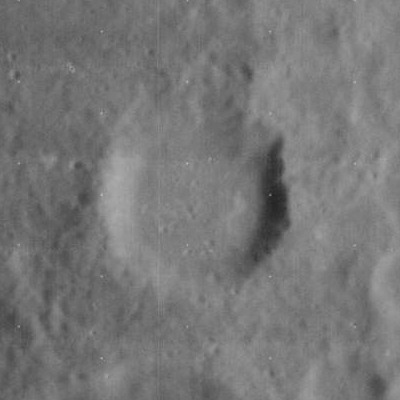
- Lunar Orbiter 4 image
- Coordinates: 43.97°N 62.04°E
- Diameter: 27.77 km (17.26 mi)
- Depth: 1.5 km (0.93 mi)
- Colongitude: 299° at sunrise
- Eponym: Richard C. Carrington

Carrington is a lunar impact crater that is located just to the northeast of the crater Schumacher, in the northeastern part of the near side of the Moon. It lies in a stretch of rough terrain between two small lunar maria, with Lacus Temporis to the northwest and the smaller Lacus Spei to the east. To the northeast of Carrington is Mercurius.

The degraded rim of Carrington is relatively featureless, with a slight protrusion at the northern end giving the formation a tear-drop shape. The interior floor is nearly level and featureless.

This formation is named after British astronomer Richard C. Carrington (1826-1875). His name was incorporated into lunar nomenclature by William R. Birt and John Lee during the 19th century. Its designation was formally adopted by the International Astronomical Union in 1935.
