= Debes (crater) =

Crater on the Moon

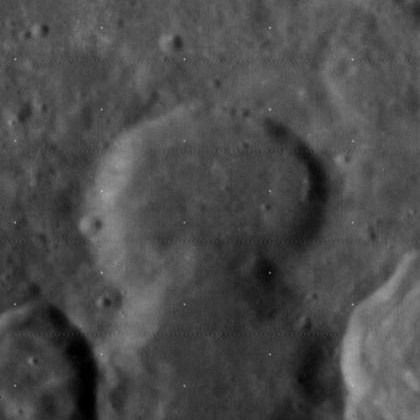
- Lunar Orbiter 4 image
- Coordinates: 29.47°N 51.62°E
- Diameter: 31.92 km (19.83 mi)
- Colongitude: 309° at sunrise
- Eponym: Ernst Debes

Debes is a damaged lunar impact crater that is located to the north of the Mare Crisium, in the eastern part of the Moon's near side. It lies just to the northwest of the crater Tralles and the prominent Cleomedes.

This crater is joined to the oval-shaped Debes A through a break in the southern rim. The latter crater is joined along its western rim by Debes B, so that the result is a triple-crater formation. The surviving rim of Debes is eroded and rounded, when compared to the sharper-rimmed Tralles, and the interior floor is relatively level and featureless.

This formation is named after German cartographer Ernst Debes. The introduction of his name into lunar nomenclature is attributed to Karl Müller. Its designation was formally adopted by the International Astronomical Union in 1935.

== Satellite craters ==
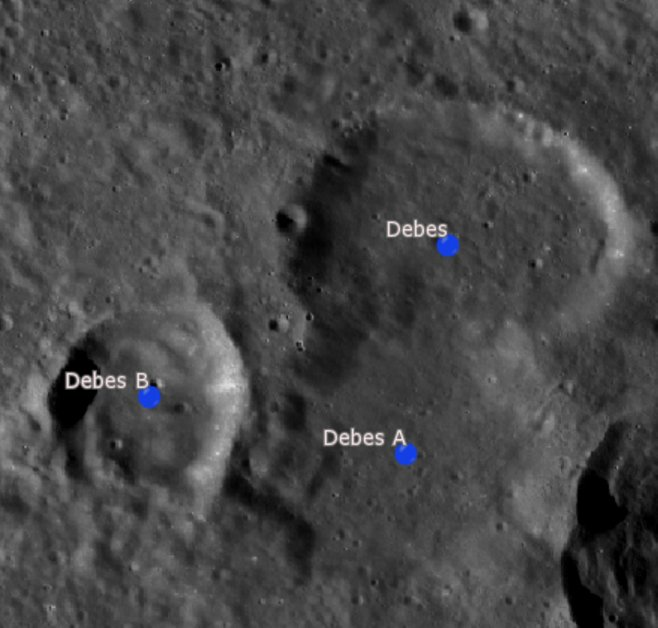
Satellite features of Debes

By convention these features are identified on lunar maps by placing the letter on the side of the crater midpoint that is closest to Debes.

Debes	Latitude	Longitude	Diameter
A	28.8° N	51.5° E	33 km
B	29.0° N	50.6° E	19 km
