= Geminus (crater) =

Charter Gemini

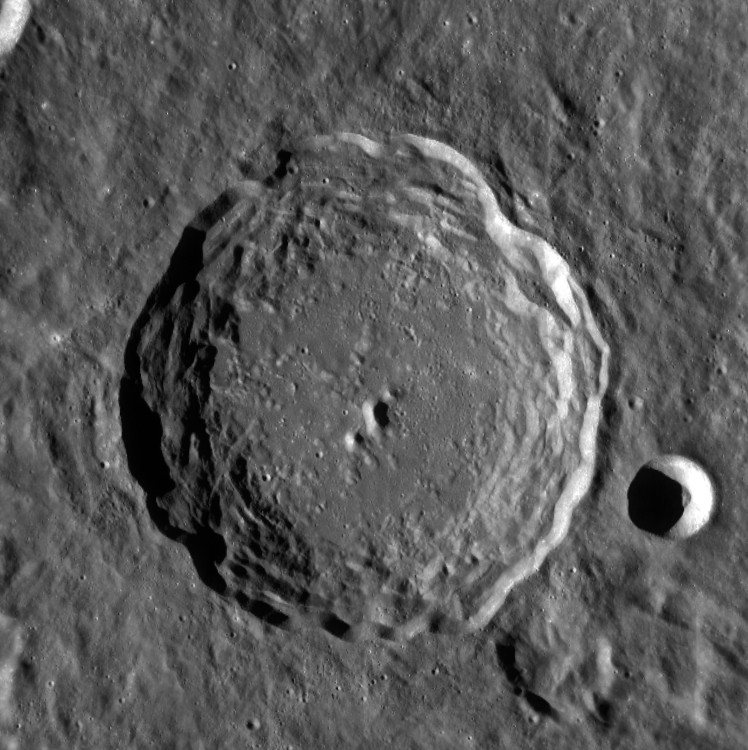
- LRO mosaic
- Coordinates: 34.42°N 56.66°E
- Diameter: 81.98 km (50.94 mi)
- Depth: 5.4 km
- Colongitude: 304° at sunrise
- Formation: Eratosthenian
- Eponym: Geminus

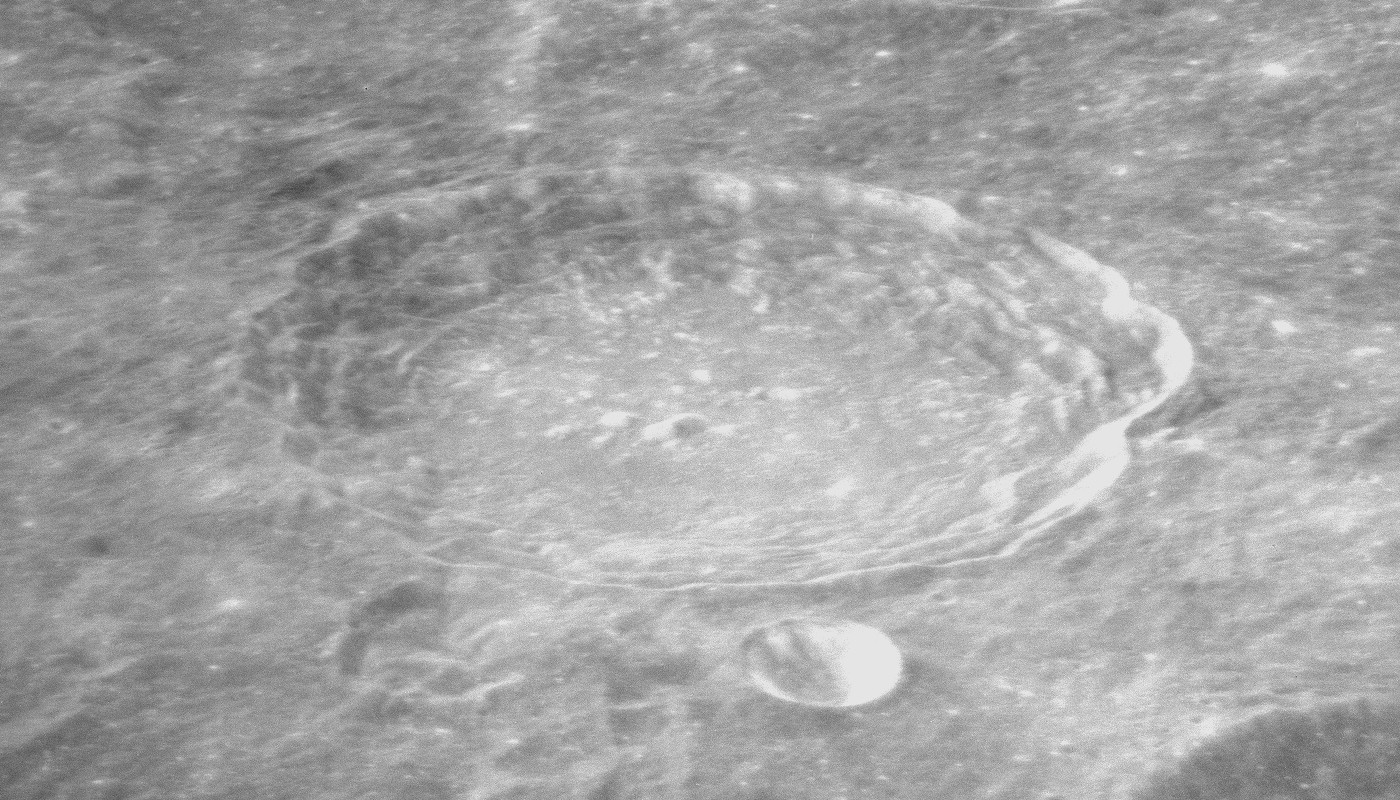
Oblique view from Apollo 16

Geminus is a lunar impact crater that is located near the northeast limb of the visible Moon. In this position the crater appears oval in shape due to foreshortening, but it is actually more nearly circular in form. It was named by the IAU in 1935.

This formation is dated to the Eratosthenian period of the lunar geologic timescale. The circular rim of Geminus contain a number of outward notches, particularly to the north and east. The crater ejecta is still visible in the rough surroundings beyond the rim, but any rays deposited during the impact have long since been worn away by space weathering. The inner wall is wide and extensively terraced, although these features are now somewhat muted due to impact erosion.

There are no notable impacts on the interior floor, but there is a long, slender central ridge located at the midpoint and a pair of readily observed clefts. The infrared spectrum of pure crystalline plagioclase has been identified on this rise and the western floor.

Notable nearby craters include Messala to the northeast, Bernoulli due east, and Burckhardt and Cleomedes to the south.

== Satellite craters ==
By convention these features are identified on lunar maps by placing the letter on the side of the crater midpoint that is closest to Geminus.

Geminus	Latitude	Longitude	Diameter
A	31.5° N	51.8° E	15 km
B	34.2° N	52.3° E	10 km
C	33.9° N	58.7° E	16 km
D	30.6° N	47.4° E	16 km
E	33.5° N	48.5° E	67 km
F	32.1° N	51.1° E	22 km
G	30.8° N	48.6° E	14 km
H	31.6° N	48.9° E	15 km
M	31.9° N	48.5° E	11 km
N	31.4° N	47.7° E	24 km
W	34.3° N	47.4° E	6 km
Z	30.7° N	46.7° E	26 km
