= Lacus Spei =

Lunar mare

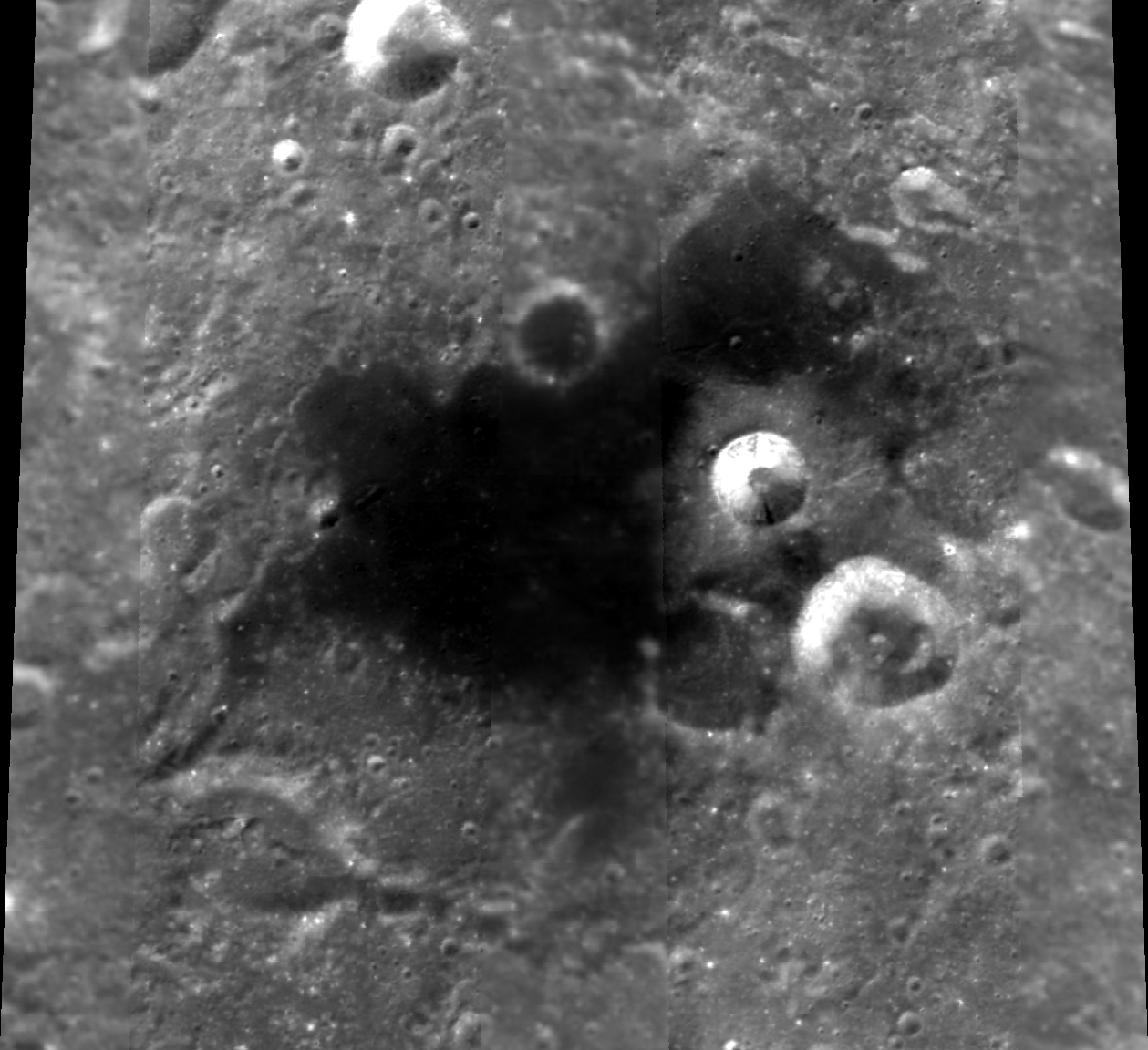
- Clementine mosaic
- Coordinates: 43.46°N 65.20°E
- Diameter: 76.67 km (47.64 mi)
- Eponym: Lake of Hope

Lacus Spei (Latin speī, "Lake of Hope") is a small lunar mare that is located in the northeastern part of the Moon's near side. It was named by the IAU in 1976.

To the north is the crater Mercurius and to the west-southwest lies Schumacher. The crater Zeno lies to the east-northeast, closer to the lunar limb.

The main part of the lake occupies a region averaging about 50 km in diameter, with an extension leading to the northeast. The surface has the same low albedo as the larger mare features on the Moon, becoming lighter in hue near the edges. The only feature on this bay is the circular, cup-shaped satellite crater Zeno P.

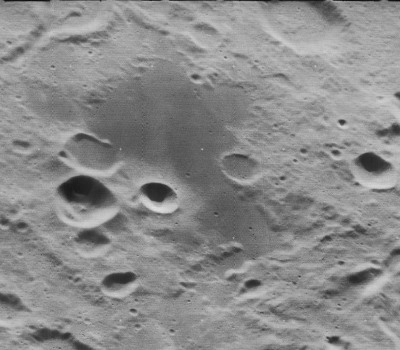
Oblique view from Lunar Orbiter 4

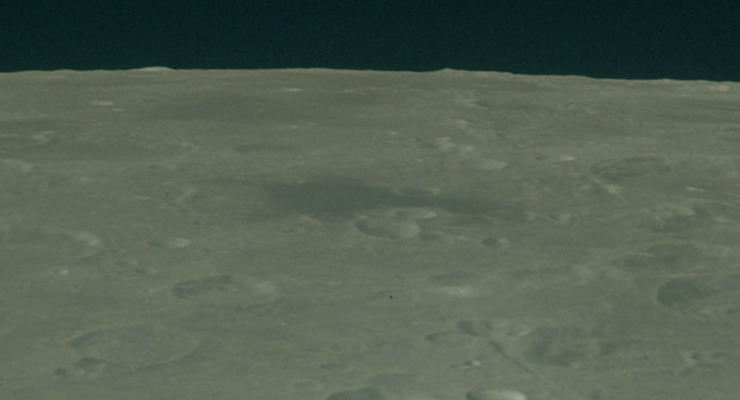
Oblique view from Apollo 16

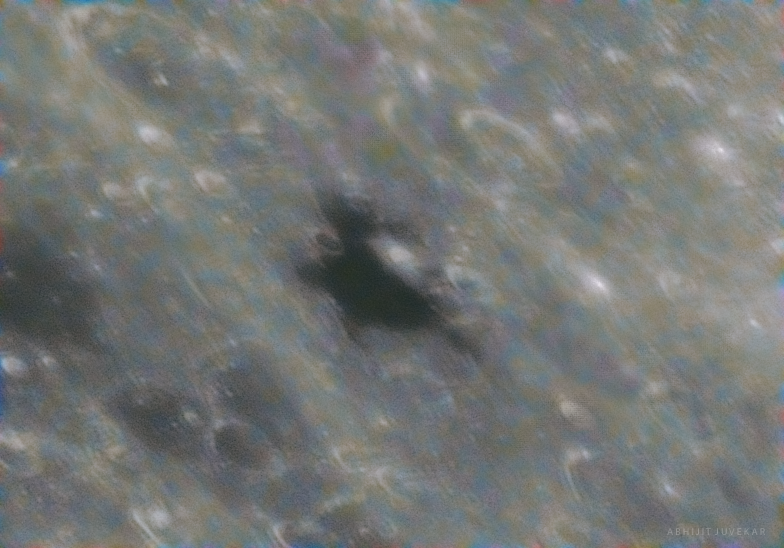
Lacus Spei, from Earth, using amateur telescope setup
