= Shuckburgh (crater) =

Crater on the Moon

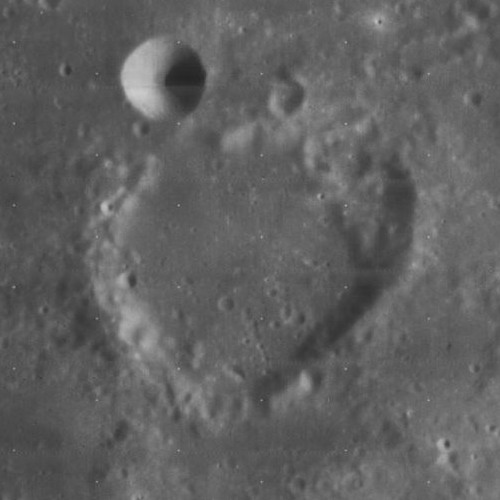
- Lunar Orbiter 4 image
- Coordinates: 42.6°N 52.8°E
- Diameter: 38 km
- Depth: 1.3 km
- Colongitude: 308° at sunrise
- Eponym: George Shuckburgh-Evelyn

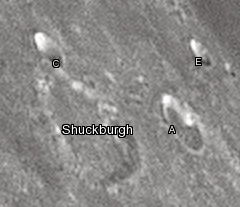

Shuckburgh is a lunar impact crater that is located in the northeastern part of the Moon's near side, named after Sir George Augustus William Shuckburgh-Evelyn. It lies south-southeast of the flooded crater Chevallier and northwest of Hooke, roughly midway between these two formations. To the northeast is the Lacus Temporis plain.

The interior floor of this crater has been resurfaced with lava, leaving a level plain surrounded by the worn and rounded outer rim. This floor is nearly featureless, being marked only by a few tiny craterlets. The edge has an outward protrusion along the eastern side, with a terrace forming a shelf along this side. There is a smaller outward protrusion in the north rim, which connects it with the small crater Shuckburgh C.

== Satellite craters ==
By convention, these features are identified on lunar maps by placing the letter on the point of the crater rim that is closest to Shuckburgh.

Shuckburgh	Latitude	Longitude	Diameter
A	43.1° N	55.5° E	19 km
C	43.5° N	52.7° E	12 km
E	44.1° N	56.9° E	9 km
