= Hooke (lunar crater) =

Crater on the Moon

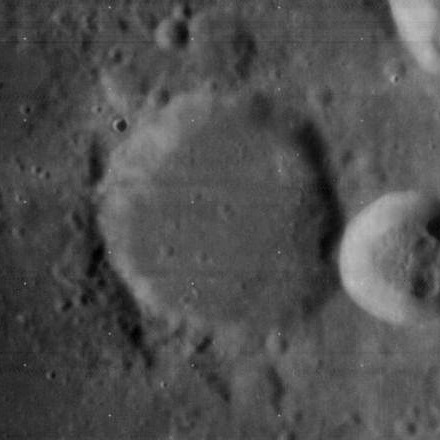
- Lunar Orbiter 4 image
- Coordinates: 41.2°N 54.9°E
- Diameter: 36 km
- Depth: 2.3 km
- Colongitude: 306° at sunrise
- Eponym: Robert Hooke

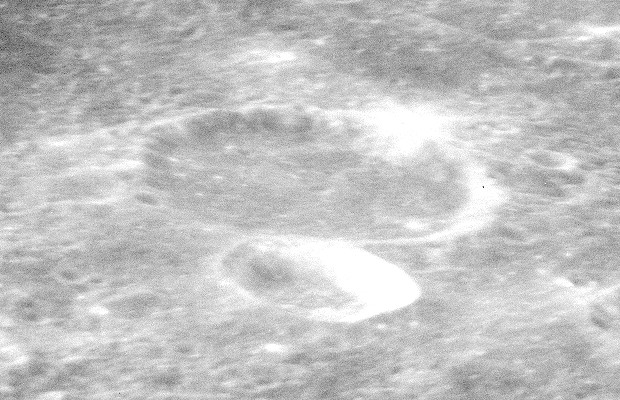
Oblique view from Apollo 16

Hooke is a lunar impact crater that is located to the northwest of the crater Messala, in the northeastern part of the Moon. It lies about a crater diameter to the southeast of the comparably sized Shuckburgh.

The low rim of this crater is moderately eroded, with the satellite crater Hooke D intruding slightly into the southeastern side. A small worn, crater is attached to the northern exterior rim. The interior floor has been flooded, leaving a level, featureless plain and a narrow inner wall.

== Satellite craters ==
By convention, these features are identified on lunar maps by placing the letter on the side of the crater midpoint that is closest to Hooke.

Hooke	Latitude	Longitude	Diameter
D	40.7° N	55.8° E	19 km
