= Mercurius (crater) =

Crater on the Moon

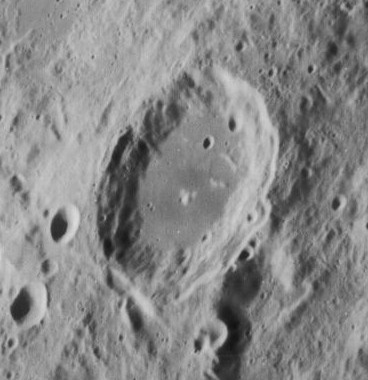
- Oblique Lunar Orbiter 4 image
- Coordinates: 46.66°N 66.07°E
- Diameter: 64.3 km (40.0 mi)
- Depth: Unknown
- Colongitude: 295° at sunrise
- Eponym: Mercury

Mercurius is a lunar impact crater that is located in the northeastern part of the Moon. It was named by the IAU in 1935.

It lies to the northeast of the smaller crater Carrington, and west-northwest of Zeno. Just to the south is the small lunar mare named Lacus Spei, and to the west is the larger Lacus Temporis.

The rim of Mercurius is circular, with a somewhat irregular edge. There are small outward bulges along several sections of the rim, with the most notable bulges being along the eastern and southern sides. The inner wall has slumped around much of the perimeter, producing a sharp edge. The sides are also somewhat worn, with some tiny craterlets overlying the inner wall.

Within the rim the interior floor has been resurfaced by lava and is nearly level, with a slight hint of a central mound. The infrared spectrum of pure crystalline plagioclase has been identified on this rise. The remainder of the floor is marked only by a few tiny craterlets and some low ridges in the northeastern corner.

== Satellite craters ==
By convention these features are identified on lunar maps by placing the letter on the side of the crater midpoint that is closest to Mercurius.

Mercurius	Latitude	Longitude	Diameter
A	48.0° N	73.6° E	20 km
B	47.4° N	70.0° E	13 km
C	47.5° N	59.4° E	26 km
D	46.1° N	68.6° E	50 km
E	49.7° N	73.3° E	29 km
F	45.2° N	62.9° E	17 km
G	45.1° N	64.3° E	13 km
H	49.2° N	63.6° E	10 km
J	47.2° N	59.0° E	9 km
K	47.4° N	73.2° E	21 km
L	45.9° N	64.3° E	12 km
M	50.9° N	73.9° E	40 km

== Sources ==
- Andersson, L. E.; Whitaker, E. A. (1982). NASA Catalogue of Lunar Nomenclature. NASA RP-1097.
- Blue, Jennifer (July 25, 2007). "Gazetteer of Planetary Nomenclature". USGS.
- Bussey, B.; Spudis, P. (2004). The Clementine Atlas of the Moon. New York: Cambridge University Press. ISBN 978-0-521-81528-4.
- Cocks, Elijah E.; Cocks, Josiah C. (1995). Who's Who on the Moon: A Biographical Dictionary of Lunar Nomenclature. Tudor Publishers. ISBN 978-0-936389-27-1.
- McDowell, Jonathan (July 15, 2007). "Lunar Nomenclature". Jonathan's Space Report. Archived from the original on 2012-02-08.
- Menzel, D. H.; Minnaert, M.; Levin, B.; Dollfus, A.; Bell, B. (1971). "Report on Lunar Nomenclature by the Working Group of Commission 17 of the IAU". Space Science Reviews. 12 (2): 136–186. Bibcode:1971SSRv...12..136M. doi:10.1007/BF00171763. S2CID 122125855.
- Moore, Patrick (2001). On the Moon. Sterling Publishing Co. ISBN 978-0-304-35469-6.
- Price, Fred W. (1988). The Moon Observer's Handbook. Cambridge University Press. ISBN 978-0-521-33500-3.
- Rükl, Antonín (1990). Atlas of the Moon. Kalmbach Books. ISBN 978-0-913135-17-4.
- Webb, Rev. T. W. (1962). Celestial Objects for Common Telescopes (6th revised ed.). Dover. ISBN 978-0-486-20917-3.
- Whitaker, Ewen A. (1999). Mapping and Naming the Moon. Cambridge University Press. ISBN 978-0-521-62248-6.
- Wlasuk, Peter T. (2000). Observing the Moon. Springer. ISBN 978-1-85233-193-1.
