= Johann Karl Burckhardt =

French astronomer and mathematician

Johann Karl (later Jean Charles) Burckhardt
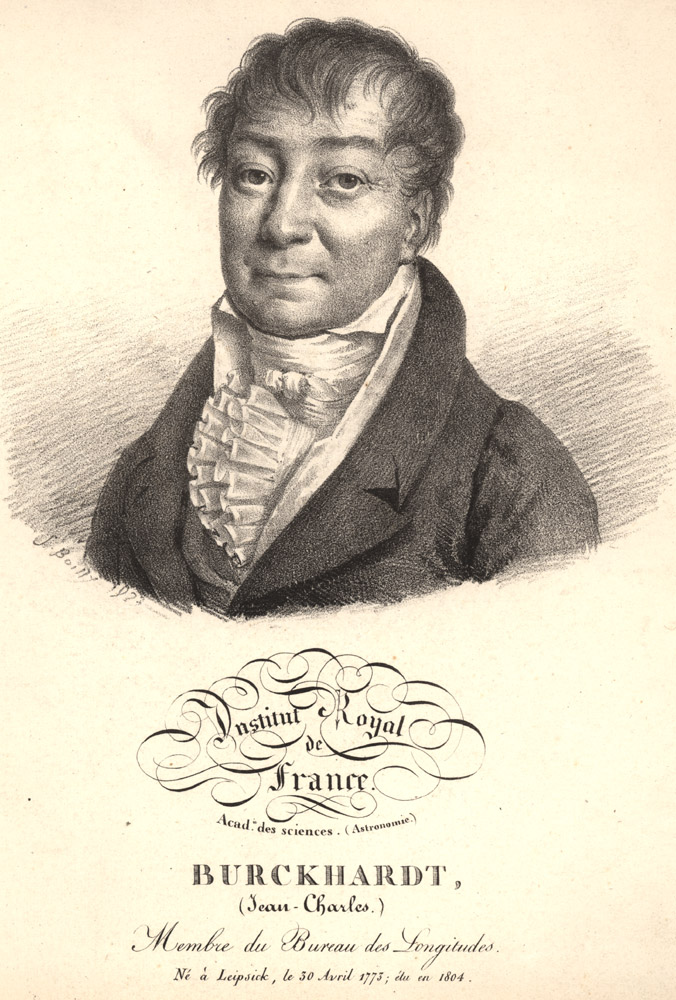
- Born: 30 April 1773; Leipzig
- Died: 22 June 1825 (aged 52); Paris
- Education: University of Leipzig
- Known for: Lunar theory
- Scientific career
- Fields: Astronomy
- Workplaces: Gotha Observatory; Bureau des Longitudes; École militaire

Johann Karl Burckhardt (30 April 1773 – 22 June 1825) was a German-born astronomer and mathematician. He later became a naturalized French citizen and became known as Jean Charles Burckhardt. He is remembered in particular for his work in fundamental astronomy, and for his lunar theory, which was in widespread use for the construction of navigational ephemerides of the Moon for much of the first half of the nineteenth century.

== Life and career ==
Burckhardt was born in Leipzig, where he studied mathematics and astronomy. Later he became an assistant at the Gotha Observatory and studied under Franz Xaver von Zach. On von Zach's recommendation, he joined the observatory of the École militaire in Paris, then directed by Jérôme Lalande. He was appointed as astronomer-adjoint to the Bureau des Longitudes and received his letters of French naturalization as a French citizen in 1799, and was elected to the L'Institut National des Sciences et des Arts in 1804. After Lalande's death in 1807, Burckhardt became director of the observatory at the École militaire. He was elected a Foreign Honorary Member of the American Academy of Arts and Sciences in 1822.

== Scientific work ==
Burckhardt carried out extensive studies on the orbits of comets, and his study of a comet of 1770 had initially gained him some professional reputation.

In 1812 he published an improved lunar theory, after that of Pierre-Simon Laplace. Burckhardt's lunar tables appear to have been the first to be based on a least squares adjustment of the coefficients to selected lunar observations, of which about 4000 were used; and a committee of the Bureau des Longitudes (consisting of Laplace, Delambre, Bouvard, Arago and Poisson) concluded after an early form of sum-of-squares analysis that Burckhardt's tables improved on those of Bürg. Accordingly, they enjoyed for some decades a substantial reputation as the most accurate available. They were officially used for computing the lunar ephemerides in the Nautical Almanac from 1821 to 1861 (but they were superseded in part, as from 1856, for computing the lunar horizontal parallax, by improved tables due to J C Adams). Burckhardt's tables were eventually replaced altogether, for issues of the Nautical Almanac for 1862 and thereafter, by new computations based on P A Hansen's more comprehensive lunar theory.

The crater Burckhardt on the Moon is named after him.

== Bibliography ==
- Burckhardt, 1794, Methodus combinatorio-analytica, evolvendis fractionum continuarum valoribus maxime idonea, Leipzig.
