= Chevallier (crater) =

Crater on the Moon

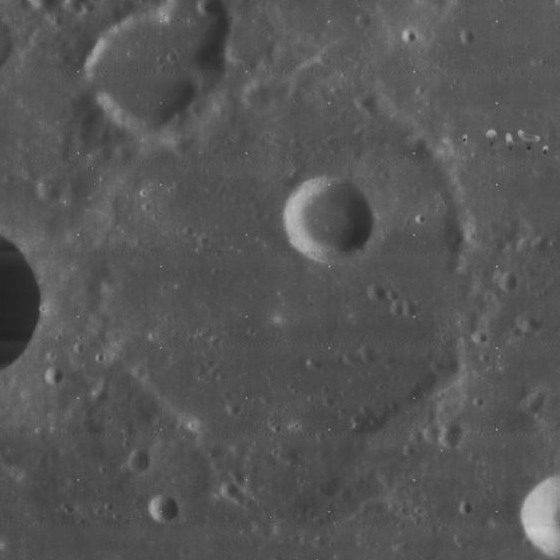
- Lunar Orbiter 4 image showing the surviving rim (center) with Chevallier B in its interior
- Coordinates: 45.01°N 51.57°E
- Diameter: 51.83 km (32.21 mi)
- Depth: 1.2 km (0.75 mi)
- Colongitude: 309° at sunrise
- Eponym: Temple Chevallier

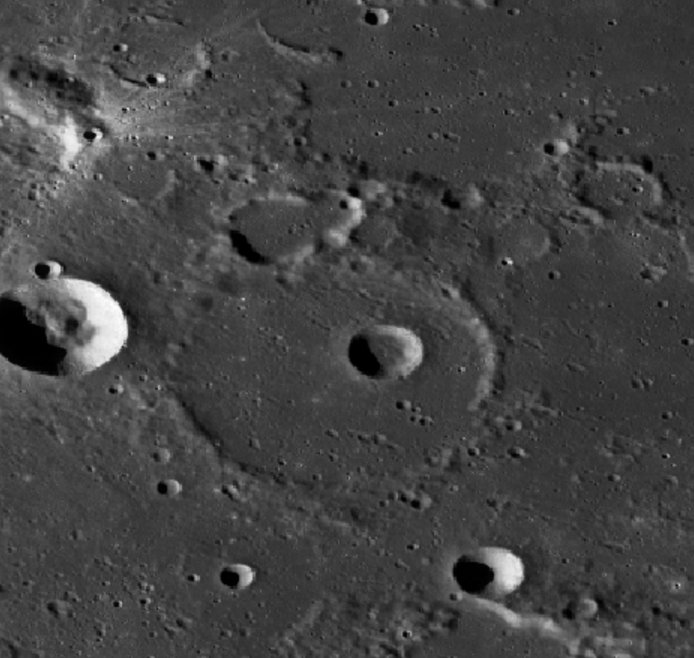
LRO mosaic

Chevallier is the remains of a lunar impact crater that is located in the northeastern part of the Moon's near side, about a crater diameter east-southeast of the prominent crater Atlas. To the south-southeast of Chevallier is the flooded crater Shuckburgh.

This formation is little more than a disintegrated crater rim protruding upward slightly from what appears to be a lava-flooded surface. All that survives of this feature is a few arcing sections of low ridges in the surface. The most prominent section of rim is along the northeast where it has merged with a smaller double-crater formation which has also been flooded. The interior floor has been resurfaced by basaltic flows, which are joined to the nearby flooded terrain. In the eastern half of the floor is Chevallier B, a small, partly flooded crater.

Just to the west of the rim of Chevallier is Atlas A, a sharp-rimmed, bowl-shaped crater. To the east is Lacus Temporis. To the northwest of Chevallier is a small impact crater with a bright skirt, forming a small ray system.

This formation is named after British astronomer Temple Chevallier (1794-1873). Its designation was officially adopted by the International Astronomical Union in 1935.

== Satellite craters ==
By convention these features are identified on lunar maps by placing the letter on the side of the crater midpoint that is closest to Chevallier.

Chevallier	Latitude	Longitude	Diameter
B	45.2° N	51.9° E	13 km
F	46.1° N	56.5° E	9 km
K	43.5° N	50.9° E	6 km
M	46.0° N	51.2° E	16 km

== Sources ==
- Rükl, Antonín (1990). Atlas of the Moon. Kalmbach Books. ISBN 978-0-913135-17-4.
- Wlasuk, Peter T. (2000). Observing the Moon. Springer. ISBN 978-1-85233-193-1.
