= William Ellis (astronomer) =

British astronomer and meteorologist

Major William Ellis (20 February 1828 – 11 December 1916) was a British astronomer and meteorologist. He was born 20 February 1828, in Greenwich, United Kingdom, the son of Henry Ellis, an assistant at the Royal Observatory, Greenwich. In 1841 he began working at the Royal Observatory, first as a computer and later as an observer.

In 1852 he took charge of Durham University Observatory, before returning the following year to the Royal Observatory, Greenwich where he first headed the Time Department and later the Magnetical and Meteorological Department.

He was elected a Fellow of the Royal Astronomical Society in 1864, a Fellow of the Royal Meteorological Society in 1875, and a Fellow of the Royal Society in 1893. He served as president of the Royal Meteorological Society in 1886 and 1887. Ellis was also a member of the Eugenics Education Society.

He succumbed to heart failure on 11 December 1916, at Blackheath, London.
