= Durham University Observatory =

Durham Observatory
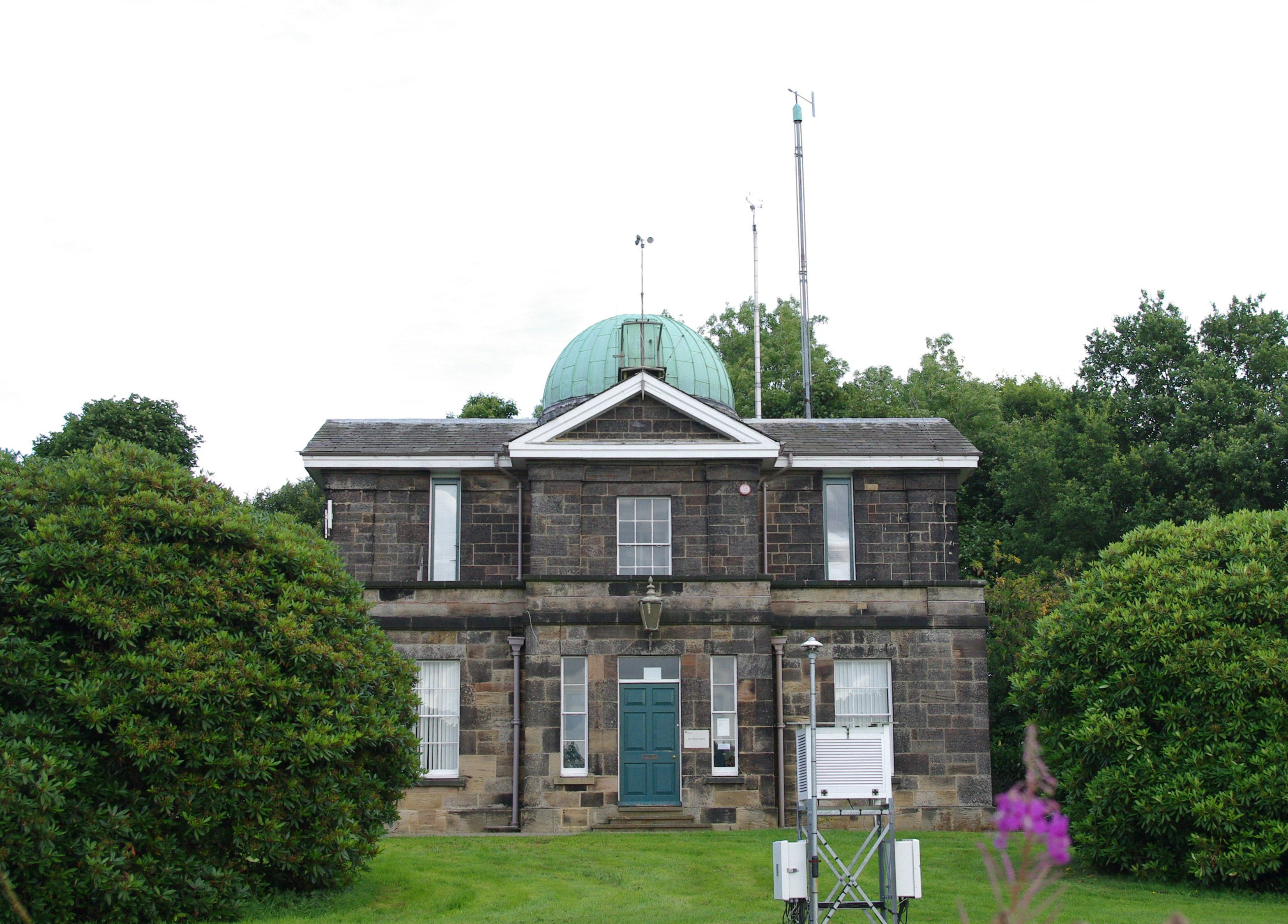
- Observatory front view

- Location within Durham, England

General information
- Type: Observatory
- Location: Potters Bank, Durham
- Coordinates: 54.768°N 1.586°W
- Construction started: 1839
- Completed: 1841
- Owner: Durham University

Design and construction
- Architect: Anthony Salvin

Website
- durhamweather.webspace.durham.ac.uk

The Durham University Observatory is a weather observatory owned and operated by the University of Durham. It is a Grade II listed building located at Potters Bank, Durham and was founded in 1839 initially as an astronomical and meteorological observatory (owing to the need to calculate refraction from the air temperature) by Temple Chevallier, until 1937 when the observatory moved purely to meteorological recording.

The observatory's current director is Professor Tim Burt of the Geography Department, who was also Master of Hatfield College.

After the Radcliffe Observatory in Oxford (from 1772) and the Armagh Observatory (from 1795), Durham has the third longest unbroken meteorological record in the UK, with records dating back to 23 July 1843, principally due to the work of Gordon Manley in creating a temperature record that would be comparable to Oxford's. In 2022, Oxford University Press published Durham Weather and Climate since 1841, analysing the observatory's weather records and giving a history of the observations, as a sister volume to their Oxford Weather and Climate since 1767 (2019). Observations were made manually until 1999, since when a Met Office automatic weather station has been used.

The observatory is a World Meteorological Organization Centennial Observing Station.

== History ==
The university established the observatory in 1839. Funds were raised by a public appeal and the site was made available by the Dean and Chapter of Durham Cathedral. The building was designed by Anthony Salvin and was completed by 1841 with the telescope installed in 1842. The latitude of the observatory was determined in 1848 by Temple Chevallier and its longitude in 1851 by Richard Carrington. An obelisk was installed in the grounds of St Leonard's School, due north of the observatory, in 1850 to check the alignment of the telescope.

In 2025, Monthly Notices of the Royal Astronomical Society assembled a collection of astronomical papers associated with the observatory, including observations carried out at the observatory by Temple Chevallier, Richard Carrington, Ralph Sampson and Edmond Hills, and a historical article by George Rochester, to celebrate the National Astronomy Meeting in Durham that year.

== Former observers ==
- 1840 – 1841 Temple Chevallier
- 1841 John Stewart Browne
- 1842 – 1846 Arthur Beanlands
- 1846 – 1849 Robert Anchor Thompson
- 1849 Le Jeune
- 1849 Robert Healey Blakey (acting)
- 1849 – 1852 Richard Carrington
- 1852 – 1853 William Ellis
- 1854 – 1855 Georg Friedrich Wilhelm Rümker
- 1856 – 1863 Albert Marth
- 1863 – 1864 Edward Gleadowe Marshall
- 1865 – 1867 Mondeford Reginald Dolman
- 1867 – 1874 John Isaac Plummer
- 1874 – 1885 Gabriel Alphonsus Goldney
- 1885 – 1900 Henry James Carpenter
- 1900 – 1919 Frederick Charles Hampshire Carpenter
- 1919 – 1938 Frank Sargent
- 1938 – 1939 E. Gluckauf
- 1940 – 1945 A. Beecroft
- 1945 – 1948 L. S. Joyce
- 1949 – 1951 K. F. and G. A. Chackett
- 1951 – 1957 J. Musgrave
- 1957 – 1968 F. and D. Glockling
- 1969 – 1999 Audrey L. Warner

== Weather records ==
Climate data for Durham Coordinates 54°46′04″N 1°35′04″W; elevation: 102 m (335 ft) 1991–2020 normals, extremes 1843–2023
Month	Jan	Feb	Mar	Apr	May	Jun	Jul	Aug	Sep	Oct	Nov	Dec	Year
Record high °C (°F)	16.3 (61.3)	17.4 (63.3)	21.8 (71.2)	24.1 (75.4)	29.7 (85.5)	30.7 (87.3)	36.9 (98.4)	32.5 (90.5)	30.0 (86.0)	25.3 (77.5)	19.3 (66.7)	15.9 (60.6)	36.9 (98.4)
Mean daily maximum °C (°F)	6.9 (44.4)	7.8 (46.0)	9.9 (49.8)	12.5 (54.5)	15.4 (59.7)	18.0 (64.4)	20.2 (68.4)	19.9 (67.8)	17.4 (63.3)	13.5 (56.3)	9.7 (49.5)	7.1 (44.8)	13.2 (55.8)
Daily mean °C (°F)	4.1 (39.4)	4.6 (40.3)	6.2 (43.2)	8.3 (46.9)	10.9 (51.6)	13.6 (56.5)	15.8 (60.4)	15.6 (60.1)	13.3 (55.9)	10.0 (50.0)	6.6 (43.9)	4.2 (39.6)	9.5 (49.1)
Mean daily minimum °C (°F)	1.3 (34.3)	1.4 (34.5)	2.5 (36.5)	4.1 (39.4)	6.5 (43.7)	9.3 (48.7)	11.3 (52.3)	11.3 (52.3)	9.2 (48.6)	6.5 (43.7)	3.6 (38.5)	1.4 (34.5)	5.7 (42.3)
Record low °C (°F)	−16.9 (1.6)	−18.0 (−0.4)	−15.0 (5.0)	−11.1 (12.0)	−4.8 (23.4)	−0.8 (30.6)	1.4 (34.5)	0.0 (32.0)	−1.7 (28.9)	−5.3 (22.5)	−12.0 (10.4)	−16.4 (2.5)	−18.0 (−0.4)
Average precipitation mm (inches)	51.8 (2.04)	44.6 (1.76)	41.1 (1.62)	51.2 (2.02)	44.4 (1.75)	61.0 (2.40)	60.9 (2.40)	66.5 (2.62)	56.9 (2.24)	63.4 (2.50)	73.0 (2.87)	61.0 (2.40)	675.7 (26.60)
Average precipitation days (≥ 1.0 mm)	11.8	9.9	8.6	9.1	8.6	9.9	10.7	10.3	9.4	11.8	12.0	12.0	124.1
Mean monthly sunshine hours	60.9	84.4	121.7	160.8	187.1	167.1	174.3	167.3	135.3	98.9	64.6	57.6	1,480
Source 1: Met Office
Source 2: Durham Weather
