= Tralles (crater) =

Crater on the Moon

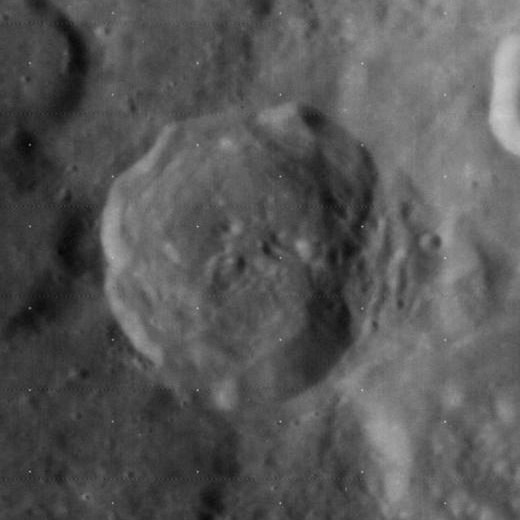
- Lunar Orbiter 4 image
- Coordinates: 28.32°N 52.85°E
- Diameter: 44.16 km (27.44 mi)
- Depth: 3.4 km (2.1 mi)
- Colongitude: 308° at sunrise
- Eponym: Johann G. Tralles

Tralles is an irregular lunar impact crater that is attached to the northwestern rim of the much larger crater Cleomedes, in the northeastern part of the Moon. Within one crater diameter to the northwest is Debes. The crater was named by the IAU in 1935 named after the German mathematician and physicist Johann Georg Tralles.

This is an oddly shaped crater formation with an irregular perimeter. The rugged interior has the appearance of three overlapping craters, with one at the south end, a second to the northeast and a third to the northwest. There are also several tiny craterlets located within the jumbled inner surface.

== Satellite craters ==
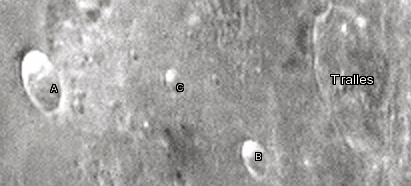
Tralles crater and its satellite craters taken from Earth in 2012 at the University of Hertfordshire's Bayfordbury Observatory with the telescopes Meade LX200 14" and Lumenera Skynyx 2-1

By convention these features are identified on lunar maps by placing the letter on the side of the crater midpoint that is closest to Tralles.

Tralles	Latitude	Longitude	Diameter
A	27.5° N	47.0° E	18 km
B	27.3° N	50.6° E	11 km
C	27.8° N	49.4° E	7 km

== Satellite crater Tralles A during full moon ==
The very bright white looking satellite crater Tralles A, west of Tralles and northeast of Lacus Bonitatis, is a telescopic eye-catcher during full moon. This bowl-shaped crater shows a high albedo region immediately northeast of it, looking like the coma or the tail of a comet. The brightness of Tralles A and the accompanying high albedo region are also noticeable on the photographic version of chart LAC 43 (page 86) in The Clementine Atlas of the Moon (Ben Bussey / Paul D. Spudis).
