= Temple Chevallier =

British clergyman, astronomer and mathematician

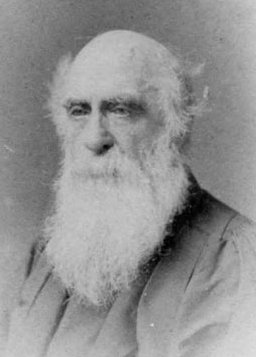
Temple Chevallier

Temple Chevallier FRAS (19 October 1794 in Badingham, Suffolk – 4 November 1873 in Harrow Weald) was a British clergyman, astronomer, and mathematician. Between 1847 and 1849, he made important observations regarding sunspots. Chevallier has been called "a remarkable Victorian polymath" (Kenworthy, 1994). Not only did he write many papers on astronomy and physics, he also published a translation of the Apostolic Fathers that went into a second edition, and translated the works of Clement of Rome, Polycarp and Ignatius of Antioch.

== Life ==
Son of Rev. Temple Fiske Chevallier, rector of Badingham, Suffolk, of the Chevallier family of Aspall Hall, Chevallier was educated at Pembroke College, Cambridge, and was ordained a priest in 1820. He became a Fellow of Pembroke College in 1819. He was a fellow and tutor of Catharine Hall (St Catharine's College, Cambridge) in 1820 and Hulsean lecturer in divinity from 1826 to 1827. He was curate and then vicar of St Andrew the Great, Cambridge.

His lectures were published as Of the proofs of the divine power and wisdom derived from the study of astronomy in 1835.

That same year, Chevallier was invited to become professor of mathematics at the newly founded University of Durham. A chair of mathematics and astronomy existed at the University of Durham between 1841 and 1871; Chevallier was the one to hold this post. He also served as reader in Hebrew from 1835 to 1871, registrar from 1835 to 1865, and from 1834 to 1835 also assisted with lectures in divinity.

He was instrumental in establishing the Durham University Observatory (in 1839), serving as its Director for thirty years, and from which he made important observations of Jupiter's moons and regular meteorological observations. From 1835 until his death, he also served as perpetual parish priest at Esh, just outside Durham, where he founded the village school and restored the church.

After his resignation in 1871 from his academic posts following a stroke, he died on 4 November 1873.

== Family ==
Chevallier had married, in 1825, Catherine, daughter of American Loyalist Charles Apthorpe Wheelwright. She died in 1858. He had three children: Catherine Temple, Alicia Temple and Temple (who died as a child).

== Legacy ==
- Chevallier was the first British astronomer to institute regular and continuous observation of sunspots.
- He is entablatured in the Cathedral Chapel of the Nine Altars (Durham) and is portrayed in the Great Hall of Durham Castle (University College, Durham) as a large, imposing man, with a heavy beard.
- The lunar crater Chevallier is named after him.
