= Burchard =

Burchard may refer to:

== People ==
- Burchard (name), Burchard and all related spellings as a given name and surname
- Burchard-Bélaváry family, an aristocratic family of Hungarian origin, originally called Both de Szikava et Bélavár

== Places in the United States ==
- Burchard, Minnesota
- Burchard, Nebraska

== See also ==
- Burckhardt, or (de) Bourcard, a family of the Basel patriciate
- Burkhardt
- Burghardt
- Burckhardt Compression, Swiss compression technology enterprise
