= Ernst Debes =

German cartographer (1840–1923)

- Portrait c. 1880s
- Born: June 22, 1840; Neukirchen by Eisenach, Duchy of Saxe-Weimar-Eisenach, Germany
- Died: November 22, 1923 (aged 83); Leipzig, Saxony, Weimar Germany
- Known for: Debes crater
- Scientific career
- Workplaces: University of Giessen (1908–1923)

Ernst Debes (Anglicized as Ernest Debes; /ˈdɛbəs/; DEB-ess; June 22, 1840 – November 22, 1923) was a German cartographer and publisher based in Leipzig. After training under August Heinrich Petermann at the Perthes Cartographic Institute, he co-founded the firm Wagner & Debes, which produced atlases for use in German schools and maps for Karl Baedeker's guidebooks. His comprehensive atlas of the world was regarded by geographers as his principal work, and it was later adapted into several other languages.

In his final years, Debes produced maps of the lunar surface by hand. In 1935, the International Astronomical Union (IAU) named Debes crater in honor of his contributions.

== Biography ==
Debes was born in 1840 in Neukirchen, a town near Eisenach in the Duchy of Saxe-Weimar-Eisenach. His father, August Debes, was a cantor. He studied mathematics and art in Eisenach and apprenticed as a surveyor in Gotha.

Map of China and Korea (1869)

He began studying at the Perthes Cartographic Institute in Gotha in 1858 as an apprentice under August Heinrich Petermann. In 1867, he and Petermann produced a manuscript map of Eduard Rüppell's journey through Abyssinia in modern-day Ethiopia, drawing the map by hand. He is considered one of Petermann's most important students.

In 1873, Debes began working with Heinrich Wagner in Darmstadt, soon after Eduard Wagner passed the lithography business that he had established in 1835 to his son. The pair operated under the name H. Wagner & E. Debes and operated out of Leipzig, considered the center of German book-making. founded their own publishing house two years later, focusing on the production of maps and atlases. They also published maps for use in guidebooks published by Karl Baedeker, who had first given a contract to Eduard Wagner in Koblenz in 1839.

He once began a treatise on cartography with the words:

The art of drawing maps is called cartography."

— Ernst Debes

Map of Europe published in Debes' school atlas (1914)

Debes became recognized in the early 1880s as these became widely used to teach geography in German schools. His New Hand Atlas, published between 1893 and 1895, was widely considered by geographers as his most masterful work. A second edition, published in 1899, contained 185 individual maps. The atlas captures a period of "imperial and exploratory interests" among European nations during the Scramble for Africa. It also included Europa, Sprachen & Völkerkarte, a map of the languages and peoples of Europe printed at a scale of 1 to 12 million. According to Rafael Company i Mateo, it was the best map of its kind in any atlas published between the Franco-Prussian War and World War I, and showed Andalusians and Castilians as distinct groups within the Spanish population. The atlas was later adapted into other languages, with two Russian editions appearing in Saint Petersburg before 1914, editions in Czech and Hungarian, and a third Russian edition followed in 1916 or 1917.

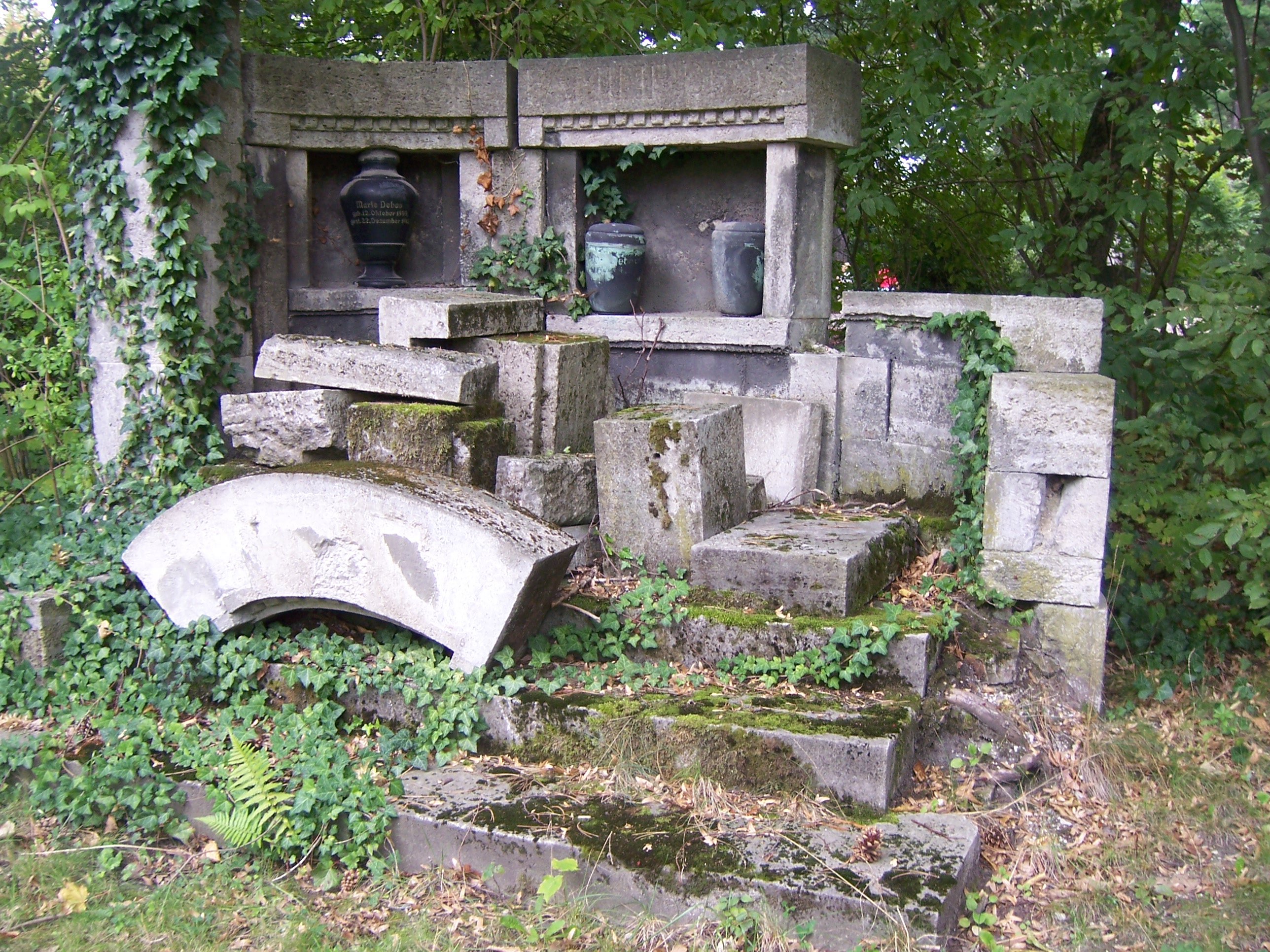
Burial in Leipzig

In 1922, Debes produced an atlas with thirty-seven maps of the near side of the Moon, titled Kleiner Mondatlas in 37 Einzeldatstellungen after the stone plates that he and Wagner used to print maps. In his maps, he named a lunar mountain range after the Jura Mountains, which was later adopted as Montes Jura. He also produced a hand-map of the lunar surface the same year, titled Handkarte des Mondes.

He died in Leipzig in 1923, aged 83. His ashes were buried in the Debes family grave in Leipzig.

== Awards and legacy ==
Debes crater on the moon

Debes was an influential figure in the development of German cartography, and Max Eckert-Greifendorff was cited as an influence. In 1908, on the fiftieth anniversary of his career, Debes was awarded an honorary doctorate from the University of Giessen. He was also appointed a professor of geography by King Frederick Augustus III of Saxony.

Astronomers from the International Astronomical Union (IAU) in Paris named a lunar crater on Mare Crisium after Debes in 1935. Debes crater is visible on the eastern part of the near side of the moon.
