= Christoph Burkhardt =

German cognitive psychologist, author, and AI researcher

- Born: 1985 (age 40–41); Germany
- Education: University of Heidelberg; LMU Munich; London School of Economics
- Alma mater: LMU Munich (PhD)
- Occupations: Cognitive psychologist, author, AI researcher, entrepreneur
- Years active: 2011–present
- Organizations: TinyBox; Burkhardt Group; OneLife; AI Impact Institute
- Known for: Don't Be a Robot: Seven Survival Strategies in the Age of Artificial Intelligence
- Title: Founder and CEO, AI Impact Institute

Christoph Burkhardt (born 1985) is a German cognitive psychologist, author, and artificial intelligence (AI) researcher. He is best known for Don't Be a Robot: Seven Survival Strategies in the Age of Artificial Intelligence (2018).

== Early life and education ==
Burkhardt grew up in Germany. After completing a bachelor's degree in cognitive psychology at the University of Heidelberg, he earned a combined diploma in business economics and psychology at LMU Munich and an MSc in organisational and social psychology from the London School of Economics. He holds a doctorate from LMU Munich.

== Career ==
Burkhardt began advising European firms on user-centred innovation during his postgraduate years. In 2011, he founded the think-tank TinyBox. His first German-language book, Durchbruch – Gute Ideen sind kein Zufall (2014), argued that creativity follows reproducible patterns. In 2016, he founded Burkhardt Group, a consulting firm specializing in digital business models and emerging technologies.

In 2019, Burkhardt joined OneLife, an air quality company, as chief executive officer (CEO) where he served until 2022, after which he joined the company's board of directors.

In 2023, Burkhardt founded the AI Impact Institute, also referred to as the Impact Innovation Institute, based in San Francisco.

== Selected works ==
- Durchbruch: Gute Ideen sind kein Zufall (2014)
- Applied Psychology for Project Managers (2015)
- Denkfehler Innovation: Warum Fehlentscheidungen oft der Grund für Fortschritt sind (2016)
- Don't Be a Robot: Seven Survival Strategies in the Age of Artificial Intelligence (2018)
