= Burkhardt Historic District =

Historic district in Missouri, United States

- U.S. National Register of Historic Places
- U.S. Historic district
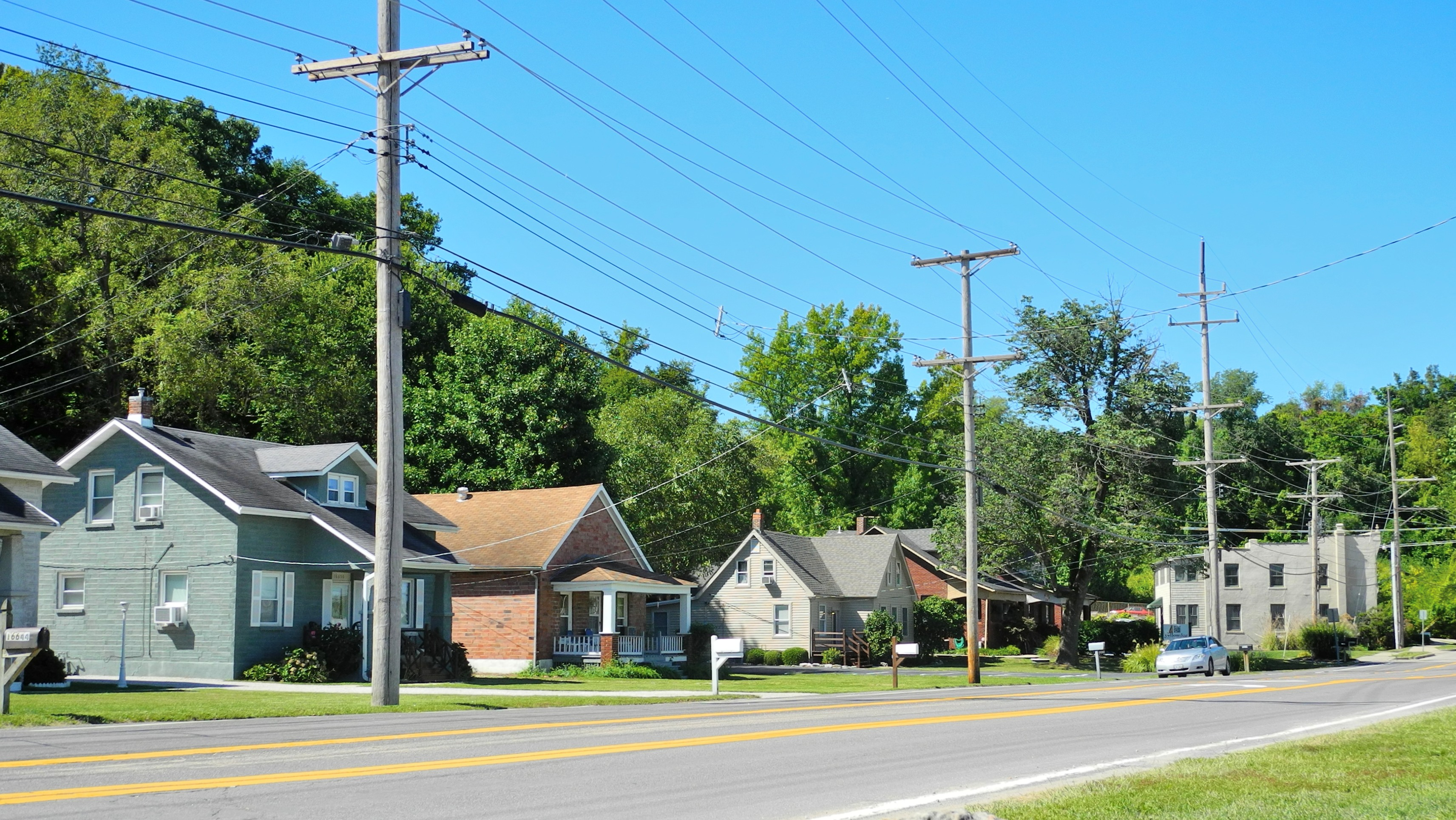
- Chesterfield Airport Rd.

- Location within Missouri Location within the United States
- Location: 16662-16678 Chesterfield Airport Rd. (original) and 16626-16660 (even numbered properties only) (boundary increase), Chesterfield, Missouri
- Coordinates: 38°39′50″N 90°34′45″W
- Built: 1914
- Architectural style: Bungalow/Craftsman, Late Victorian
- NRHP reference No.: 00001011 (original); 06000330 (increase)

Significant dates
- Added to NRHP: August 31, 2000
- Boundary increase: May 5, 2006

The Burkhardt Historic District, in Chesterfield, Missouri not far from the Missouri River, was listed on the National Register of Historic Places in 2000, and the listed area was expanded in 2006 to extend further down the south side of Chesterfield Airport Road.

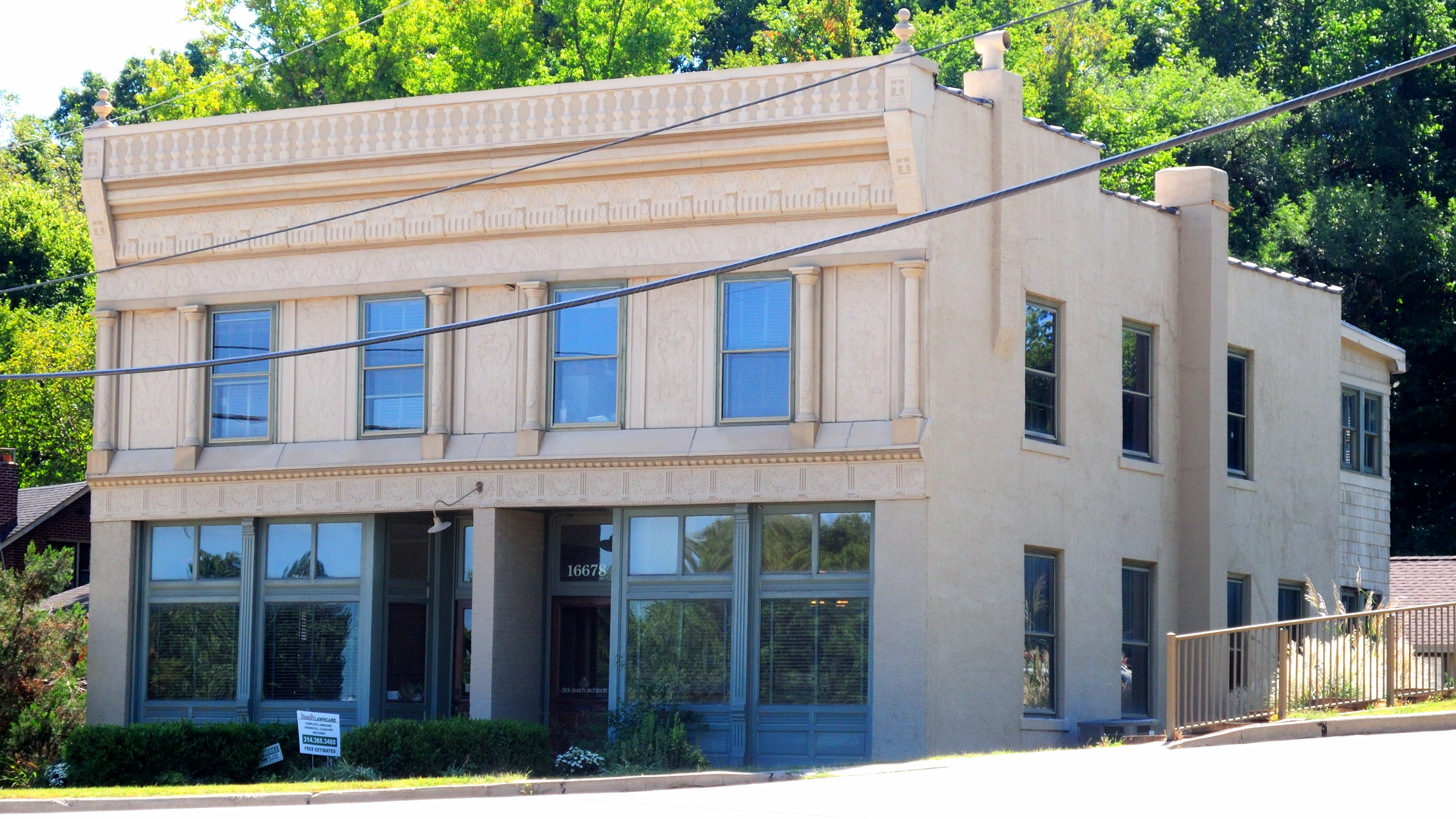
Farmers State Bank of Chesterfield

The district consists entirely or mostly of buildings built by or for businessman Edward Burkhardt along what was then known as Olive Street Road (sic) and later became Chesterfield Airport Road. It includes the [Farmers State Bank of Chesterfield (1914), a two-story commercial building which was individually listed on the National Register in 1999. Five buildings were built of structural ceramic tile and brick, which was then a new method of construction. These are two nearly identical Craftsman-style bungalow houses built in 1926 and three garages. And behind one of the bungalows is a small other residence.

The increase added 10 properties, including eight houses and seven outbuildings that are deemed contributing to the historic character of the district, all built within c.1918-c.1925. Most are built with structural ceramic tile and brick construction, and most of the houses were built from standardized plans.
