= Burckhardt House =

- U.S. National Register of Historic Places
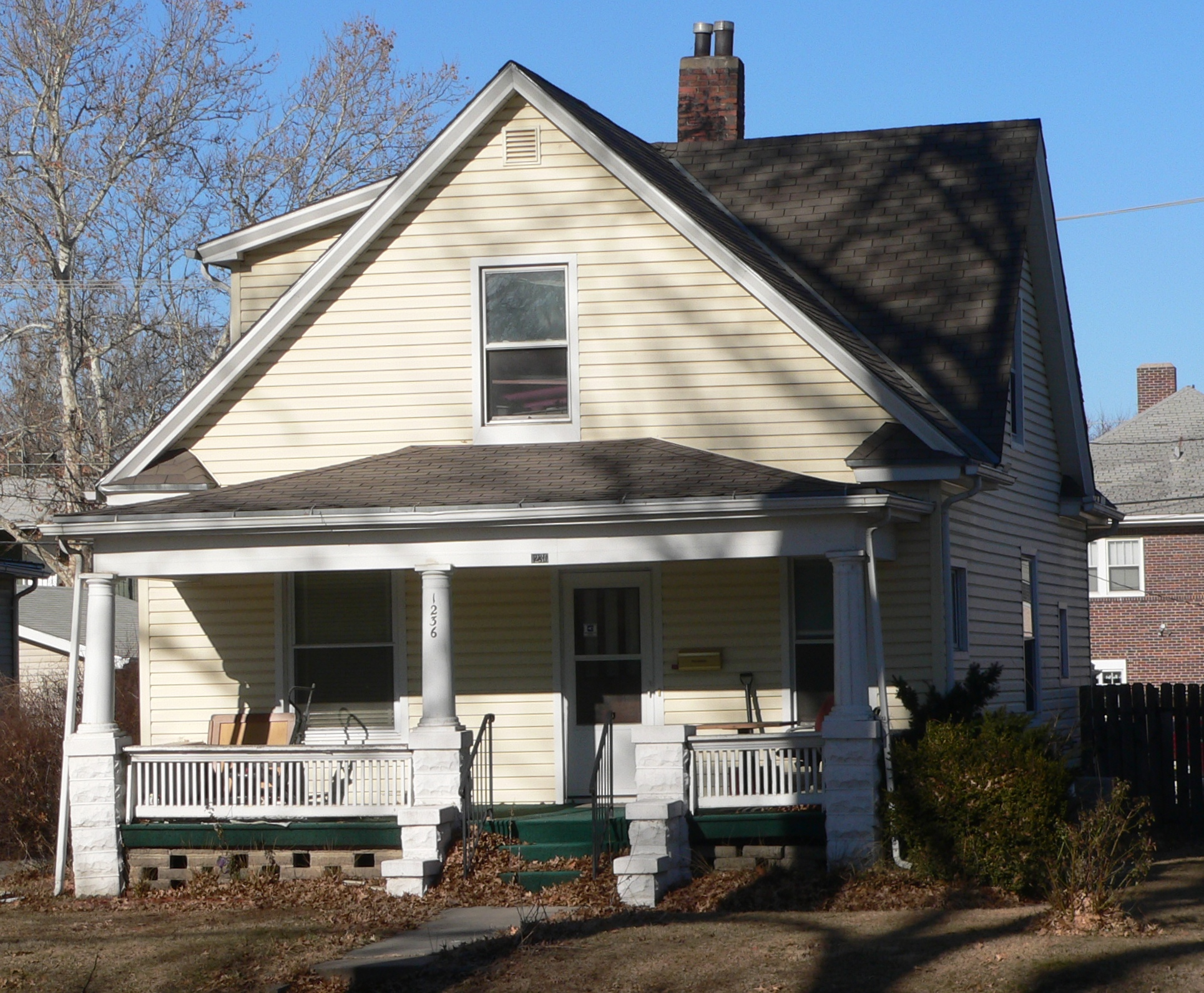
- Burckhardt House, seen from the south
- Location: 1236 Washington St., Lincoln, Nebraska
- Coordinates: 40°47′53.99″N 96°42′11.41″W
- Area: Less than one acre
- Built: 1903
- Architectural style: Prairie Box
- NRHP reference No.: 99000746
- Added to NRHP: June 25, 1999

The Burckhardt House is a 1 1/2-story Prairie Box style home built in Lincoln, Nebraska in 1903. The Burckhardt House is listed on the National Register of Historic Places for its architectural features and significance as the home of Reverend Oliver J. Burckhardt and Anna Jones Burckhardt.

== Description ==
The Burckhardt House is unique in Lincoln architecture because of its Prairie Box/American Foursquare style. The house follows a simple, rectangular plan, and features a cross gabled roof with return box eaves on the south facing front gable, a shed roofed dormer on the west side, and a hip roof porch on the front facade. Though not originally present, the exterior asphalt faux-brick siding was added to the home by the Burckhardts in 1939 and thus contributes to the building's historicity. A full-width porch--featuring neoclassical wooden columns on concrete block supports and a wooden balustrade with simple square-section balusters--dominates the south facade of the home where the main entrance is found. The house also features a small, second-story wooden balcony on the east facade and double-hung windows with decorative muntins in the upper sash.

== The Burckhardts ==
Reverend Oliver J. Burckhardt, born in Howard County, Missouri in 1868, was a local leader for the African American community in Lincoln. Rev. Burckhardt graduated from Lincoln Institute in Jefferson City, Missouri, a college founded by African American Civil War veterans, before moving to Lincoln in 1890. In 1898, Rev. Burckhardt married Anna Jones (b. 1868, Burlington, Iowa).

The Burckhardts became influential leaders in Lincoln both within the African American community and the city as a whole. Oliver served as a minister and missionary for the African Methodist Church. He is credited with helping to settle over two hundred African Americans in the Brownlee area of Cherry County, Nebraska between 1910 and 1912 as well as establishing St. James church in the town.

Rev. Burckhardt was also a key figure in the creation of the Lincoln branch of the National Association for the Advancement of Colored People in 1918. Burckhardt recruited prominent local individuals, including the lieutenant governor and governor of Nebraska, to join the NAACP. Burckhardt, along with J.E. Jeltz and William Woods, successfully prevented The Birth of a Nation from being shown in Lincoln, based on the legal argument that the film was intended to "inflame public opinion against blacks" despite African American contributions to the war effort.

Burckhardt was instrumental in the formation of the Christian Alliance and the Lincoln Urban League in 1932, and was frequently consulted by local government officials for advice on issues regarding the African American community in Lincoln. Burckhardt also served as the Associate Chaplain at the State Penitentiary for twenty years before moving to Omaha following his wife's death in 1945 to become the pastor of the Church of Christ Holiness until his death in 1951.

Anna Burckhardt was a self-taught artist of national acclaim, an almost impossible feat for an African American woman in her time. Anna is best known for her oil paintings and china paintings, receiving a bronze medal for her china painting at the 1907 Jamestown Virginia Tercentennial Exposition. Anna was well-loved in Lincoln, offering private art lessons to children of all races for over 40 years. Anna was also pioneering as one of very few commissioned artists of color, creating works for the People's City Mission--a local homeless advocacy center and shelter--and was even hired by the State of Nebraska to restore several paintings in the Nebraska State Capitol.

== Gallery ==
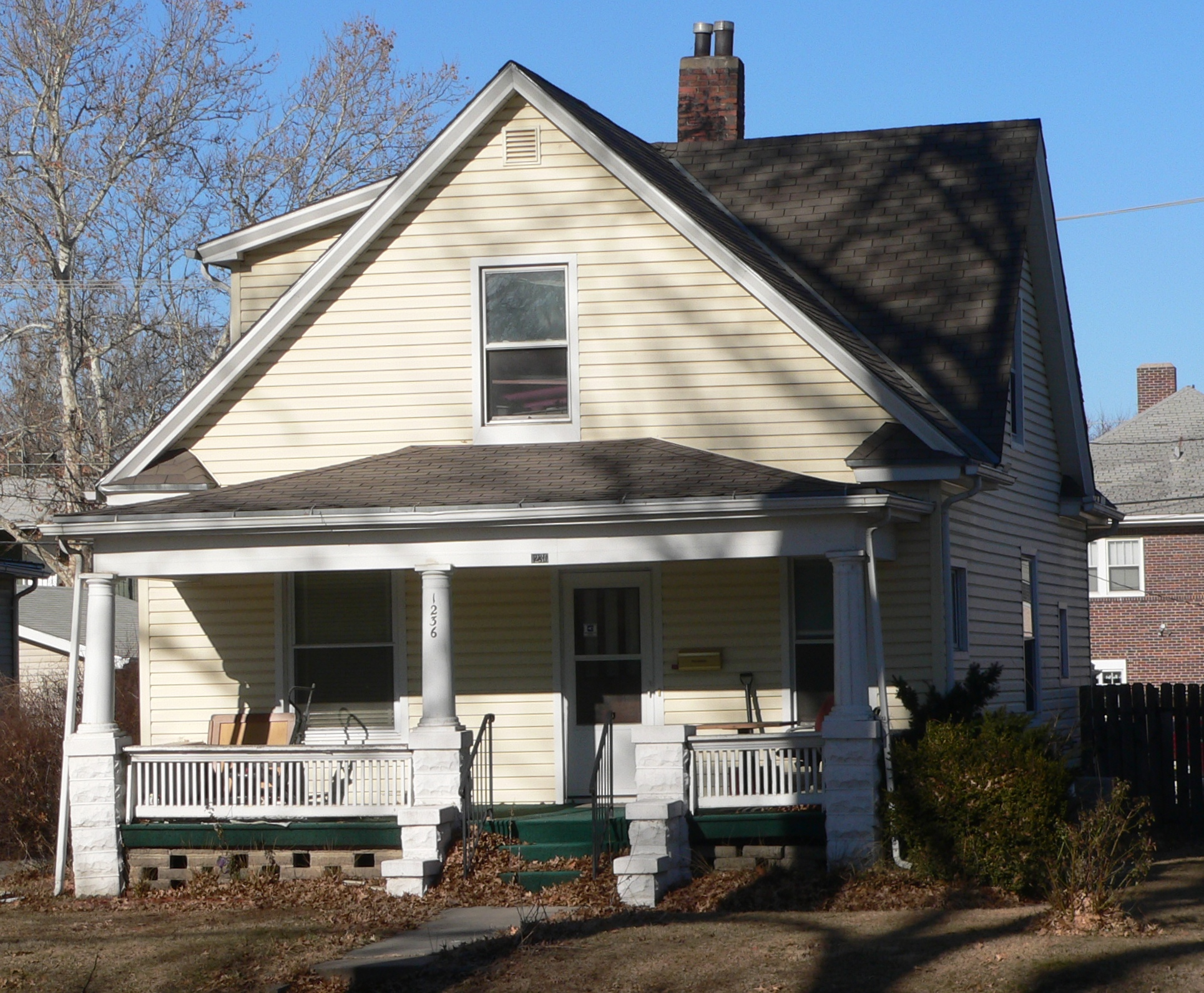
Burckhardt House seen from the south.

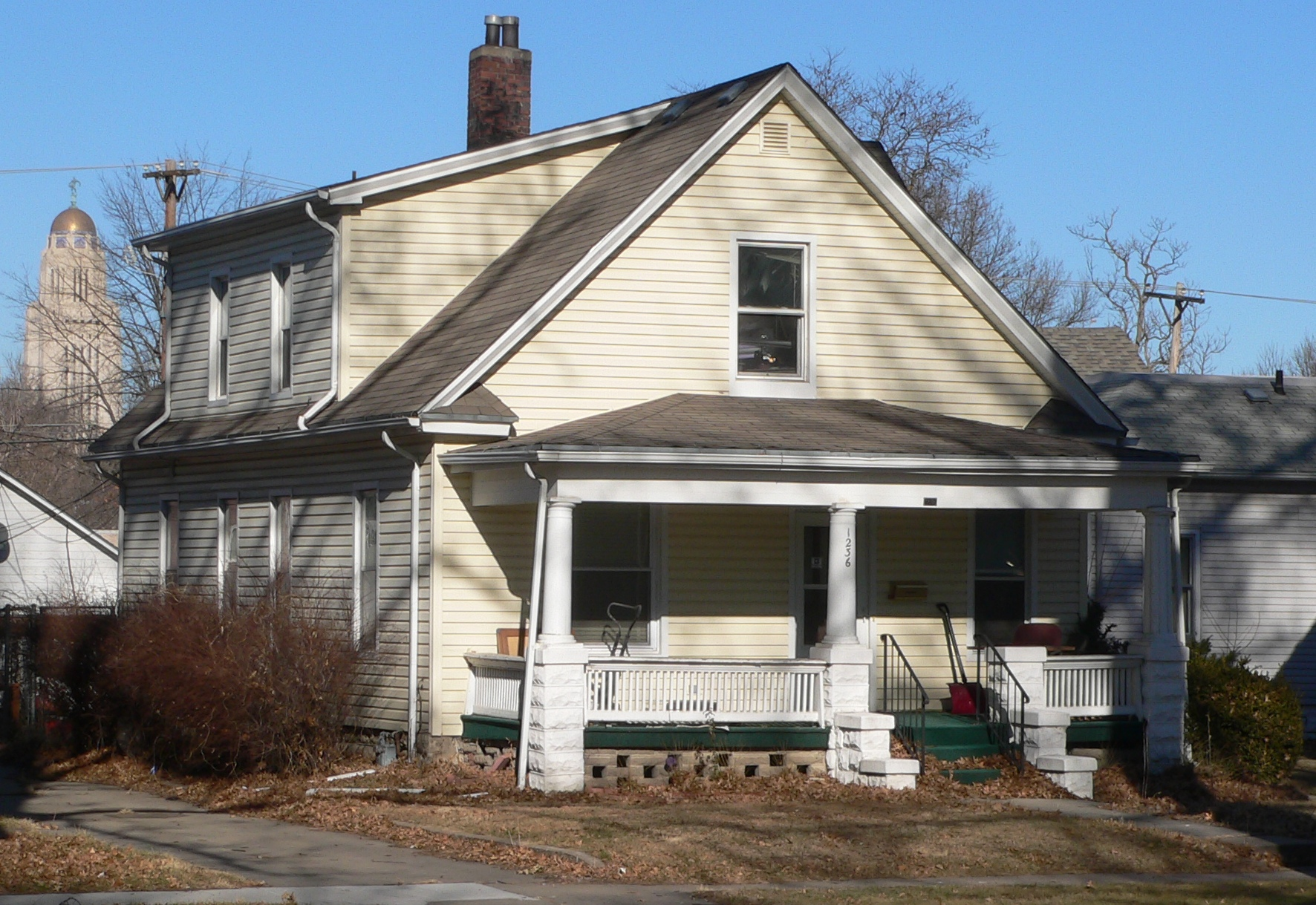
Burckhardt House seen from the southwest.

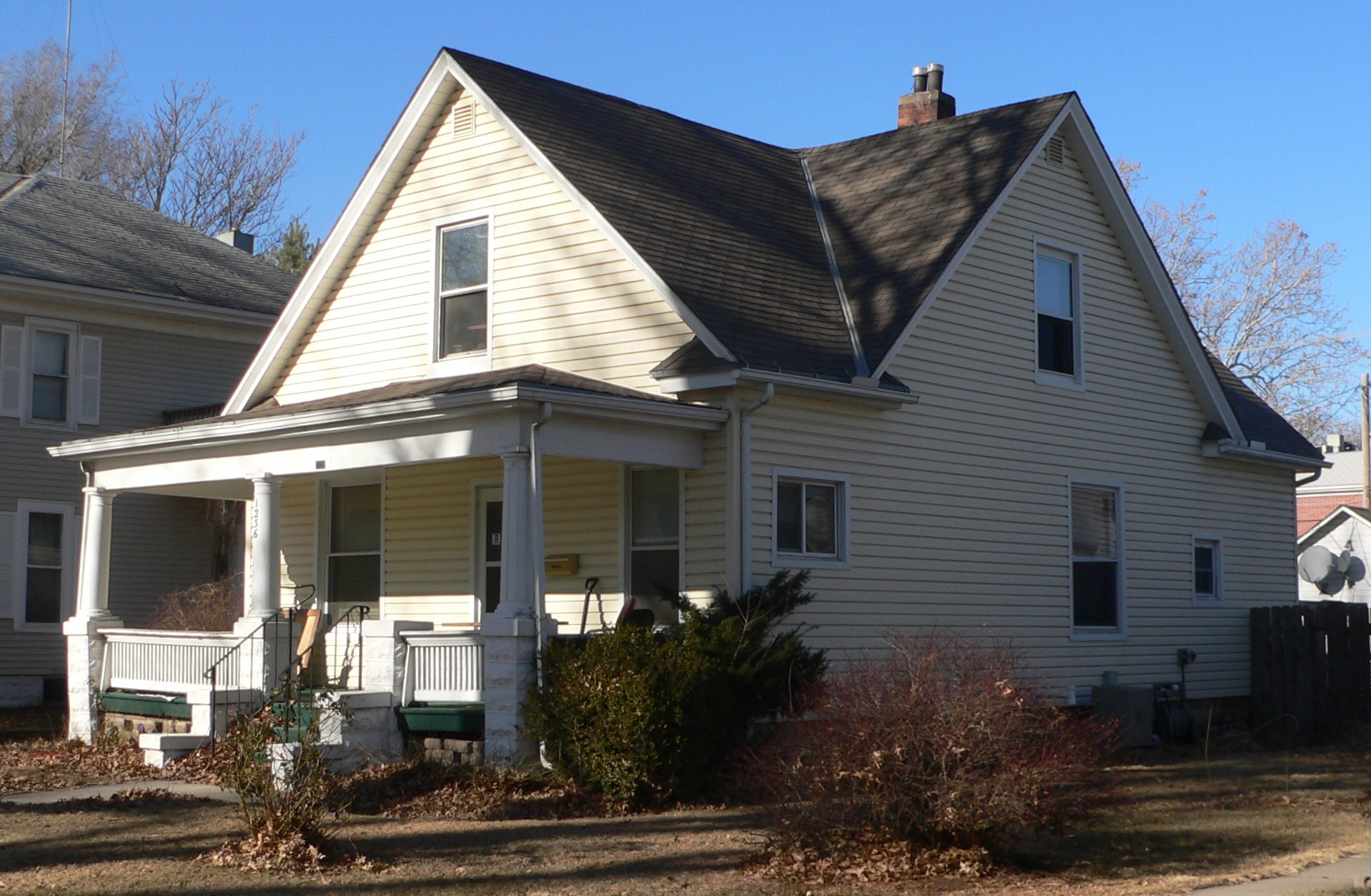
Burckhardt House seen from the southeast.

== See also ==
- History of Lincoln, Nebraska
- Lincoln, Nebraska
- National Register of Historic Places listings in Nebraska
- African-American art
- Nebraska
- African Americans in Omaha, Nebraska
