= A. E. Burckhardt House =

Historic house in Ohio, United States

- U.S. National Register of Historic Places
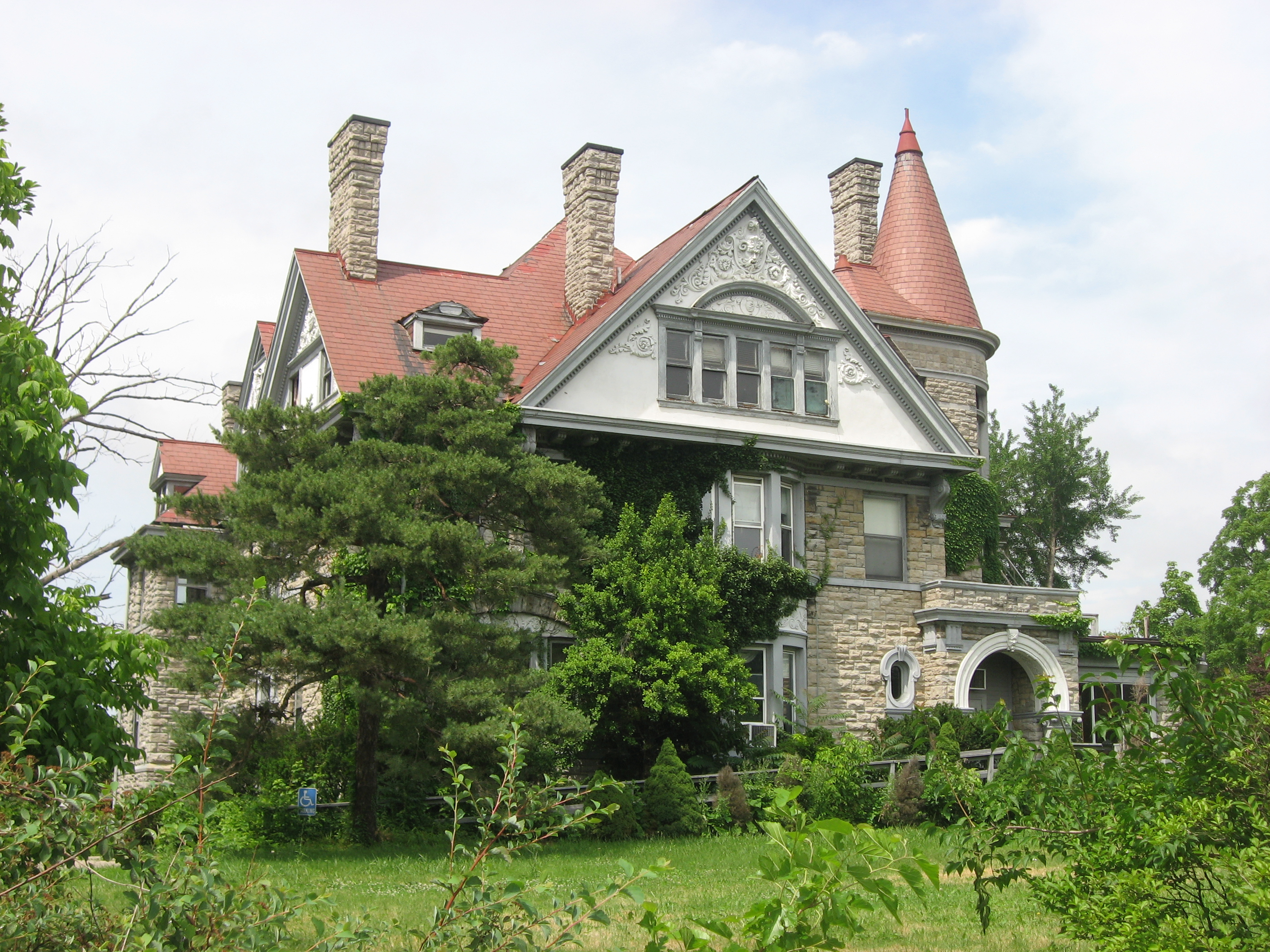
- Front of the house

- Location within Ohio Location within the United States
- Location: 400 Forest Ave., Cincinnati, Ohio
- Coordinates: 39°8′48″N 84°29′58″W
- Area: less than one acre
- Built: 1887
- Architect: Hannaford, Samuel, & Sons
- Architectural style: Late Victorian
- MPS: Samuel Hannaford and Sons TR in Hamilton County
- NRHP reference No.: 80003038
- Added to NRHP: March 3, 1980

A. E. Burckhardt House is a registered historic building in Cincinnati, Ohio, United States, that was listed in the National Register on March 3, 1980. It was designed by Samuel Hannaford.

It was home of Bavarian-born furrier Adam Edward Burkhardt, who established his company in Cincinnati in 1866.

The Burkhardt House was demolished in October 2022 after a period of vacancy.
