= Hugh Burkhardt =

British educational designer (1935–2024)

Hugh Burkhardt (4 April 1935 – 3 February 2024) was a British theoretical physicist and educational designer. He was Director of The Shell Centre for Mathematical Education at the University of Nottingham, UK from 1976 to 1992 and is the creator of ISDDE, the International Society for Design and Development in Education.

== Life and career ==
Burkhardt had a bachelor's degree in Theoretical Physics from the University of Oxford, and PhD in Mathematical Physics from the University of Birmingham. He joined the Shell Centre in Nottingham in 1976 as Director and Professor of Mathematical Education, serving until 1992. Since then he has led a series of international education design projects including Balanced Assessment and MARS (the Mathematics Assessment Resource Service) in the US, with visiting appointments at UC Berkeley and at Michigan State University. He is Emeritus Professor of Mathematical Education at the University of Nottingham. In 2005 Burkhardt recognised a need for an international organisation which focused on the design and development process that is used to produce educational materials, and so set up ISDDE.

Burkhardt died on 3 February 2024, at the age of 88.

== Publications ==
Burkhardt published articles, papers and book chapters on mathematics education, in particular mathematical modelling, educational design (what Burkhardt terms "engineering research") and education policy.

== Awards ==
Burkhardt, along with colleague at the Shell Centre Malcolm Swan, were the first recipients of the Emma Castelnuovo Award for Excellence in the Practice of Mathematics Education, awarded by the International Commission on Mathematical instruction (ICMI). In 2013 he won the ISDDE Prize for Excellence in Educational Design (affectionately known as the Eddie) for 'his leadership of the Shell Centre for Mathematical Education, his contributions to a large number of its influential products, and the development of its engineering research methodology.'
