= Messala (crater) =

Crater on the Moon

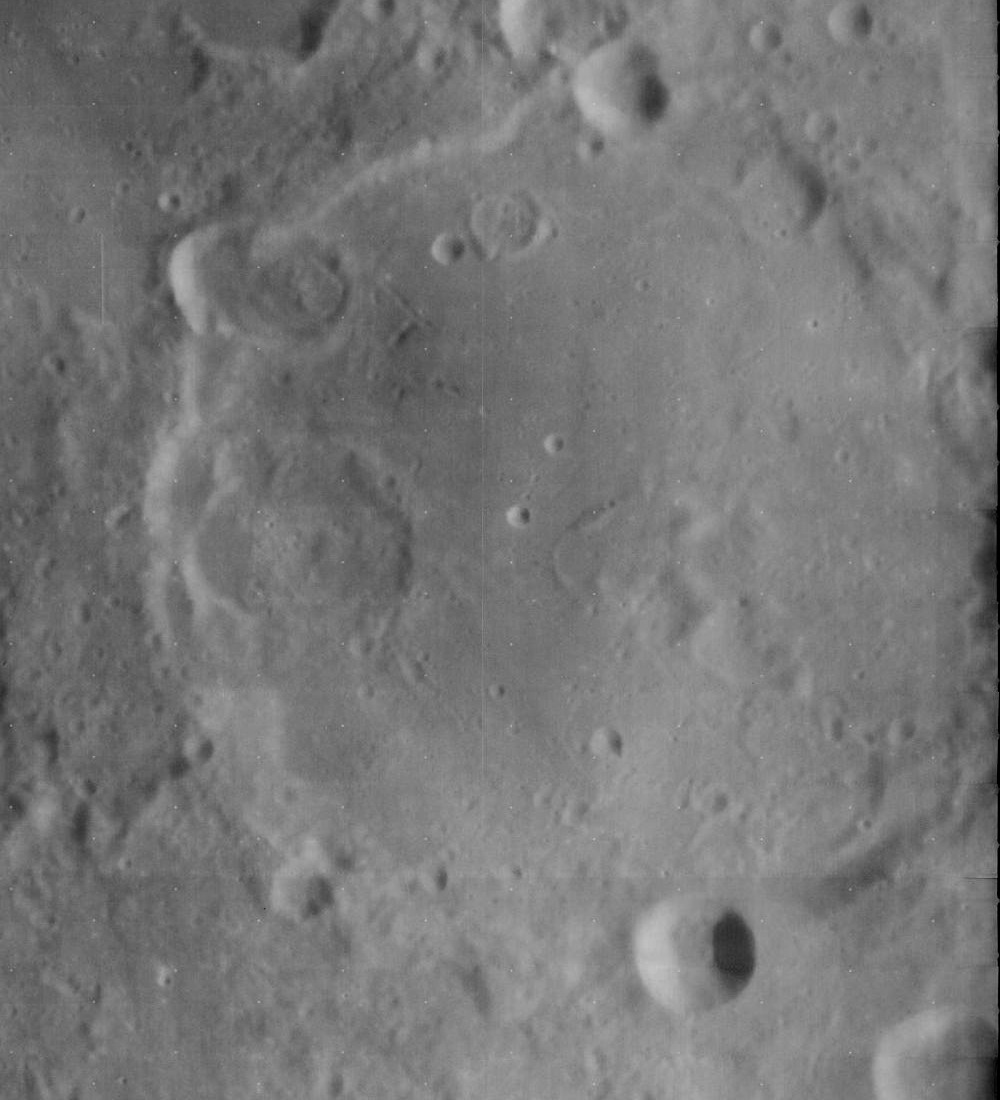
- Lunar Orbiter 4 image
- Coordinates: 39.31°N 60.06°E
- Diameter: 122.4 km (76.1 mi)
- Depth: 1.1 km
- Colongitude: 313° at sunrise
- Formation: Pre-Nectarian
- Eponym: Messala

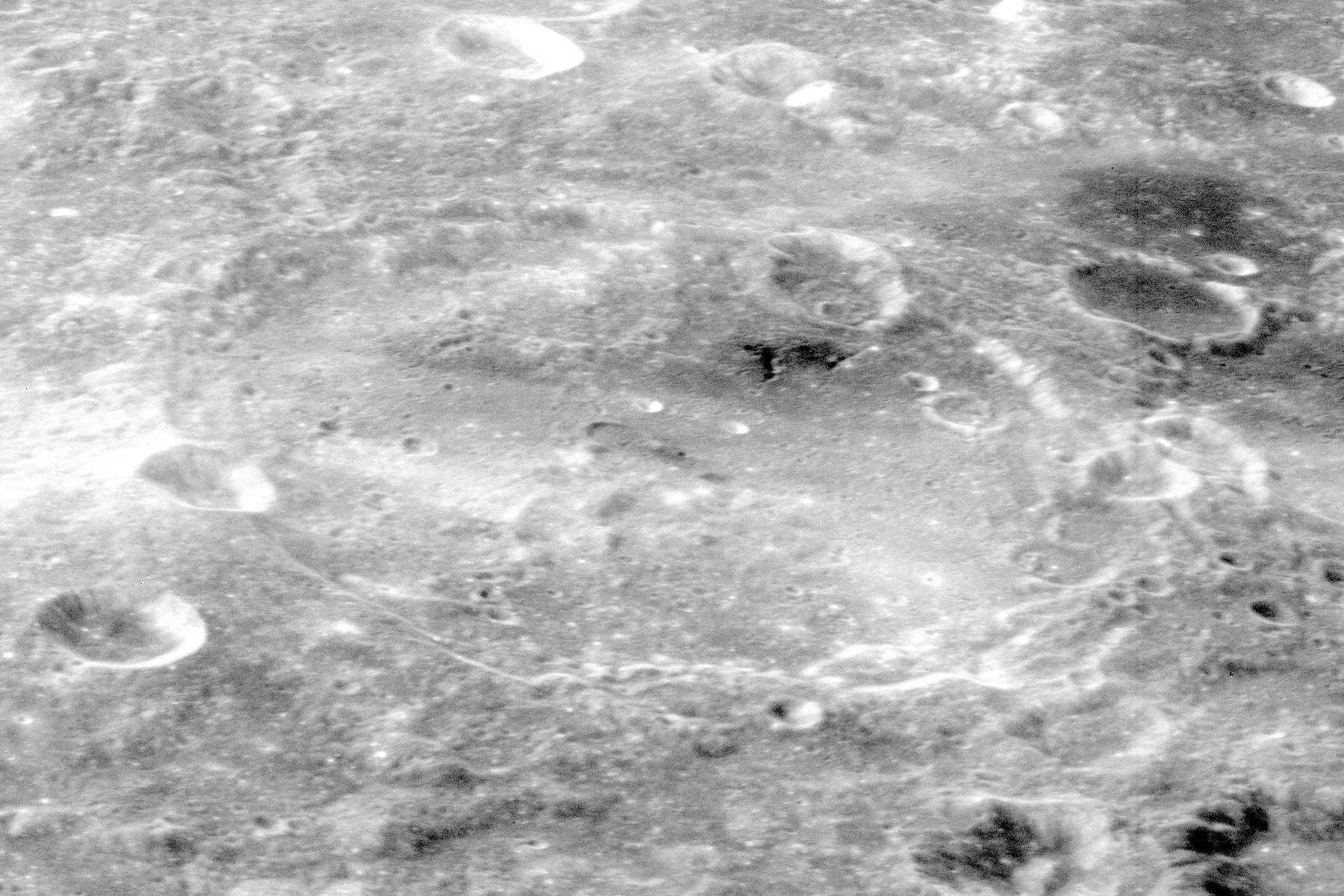
Oblique view from Apollo 16

Messala is a lunar impact crater of sufficient dimension to belong to the category of impact features known as walled plains. It is located in the northeastern part of the Moon, close enough to the rim to appear significantly foreshortened. It was named by the IAU in 1935.

The outer rim of this formation has received a significant amount of erosion due to minor impacts, but much of the outer wall retains its original shape and a certain degree of terracing. The rim is broken by smaller craters along the south, north, and northwest sides, designated Messala B, J, and K, respectively. Messala J has a narrow gouge in its eastern rim leading one crater diameter to the east. It is attached to a slightly larger crater which lies across the southern rim of Schumacher crater. The interior floor is relatively level but contains irregularities in the surface at some locations, including some dark fractures in the northwestern floor. There is a ghost crater along the western inner wall.

To the southwest is the prominent crater Geminus, and due south is the smaller Bernoulli.

== Origin of name ==
The crater is named after Masha'allah ibn Atharī (c.740-d.815 AD), a Persian Jewish astrologer and astronomer from the city of Basra (now located in modern-day Iraq) who was the leading astrologer of the late 8th century. Masha'allah was one of the most prominent members of the commission which decided for Caliph al-Mansur (A.D. 754–775) that the propitious moment for the founding of Baghdad fell on 30 July 762.

== Satellite craters ==
By convention these features are identified on lunar maps by placing the letter on the side of the crater midpoint that is closest to Messala.

Messala	Latitude	Longitude	Diameter
A	36.6° N	53.8° E	26 km
B	37.4° N	59.9° E	18 km
C	40.9° N	65.8° E	12 km
D	40.5° N	67.8° E	28 km
E	40.0° N	64.9° E	40 km
F	38.9° N	64.4° E	32 km
G	39.1° N	68.6° E	29 km
J	41.1° N	61.2° E	15 km
K	41.1° N	58.5° E	13 km
