= Zeno (crater) =

Crater on the Moon

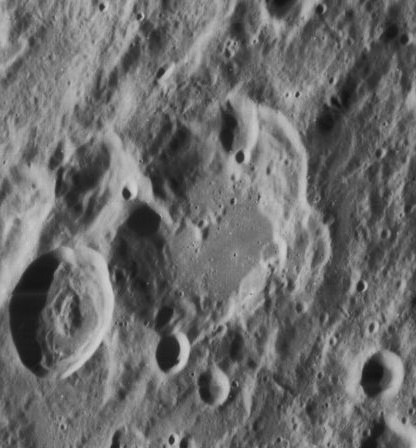
- Oblique Lunar Orbiter 4 image
- Coordinates: 45.15°N 72.98°E
- Diameter: 66.78 km (41.50 mi)
- Depth: Unknown
- Colongitude: 288° at sunrise
- Eponym: Zeno of Citium

Zeno is a lunar impact crater located near the northwestern limb of the Moon. It was named by the IAU in 1935.

The rim of Zeno is slightly distorted and has received some erosion due to subsequent impacts. There is a depression in the surface attached to the eastern rim, forming a bulging extension. Small craters lie on the southern rim and across the interior of the northern wall. The crater Zeno B is attached to the exterior of the southwestern rim, and the distorted Zeno A is attached in turn to the western rim of Zeno B.

Zeno lies to the east-southeast of the crater Mercurius. Farther to the east of Zeno, along the limb, is the well-formed crater Boss.

== Satellite craters ==
By convention these features are identified on lunar maps by placing the letter on the side of the crater midpoint that is closest to Zeno.

Zeno	Latitude	Longitude	Diameter
A	44.5° N	70.0° E	44 km
B	44.0° N	71.0° E	37 km
D	45.0° N	71.2° E	29 km
E	41.7° N	70.8° E	18 km
F	42.4° N	80.0° E	17 km
G	43.9° N	73.1° E	11 km
H	41.4° N	74.4° E	17 km
J	44.2° N	76.3° E	13 km
K	42.8° N	66.6° E	18 km
P	43.4° N	66.1° E	11 km
U	42.5° N	68.8° E	16 km
V	43.0° N	69.3° E	22 km
W	43.3° N	67.6° E	10 km
X	43.6° N	76.9° E	17 km
