= Schumacher (crater) =

Crater on the Moon

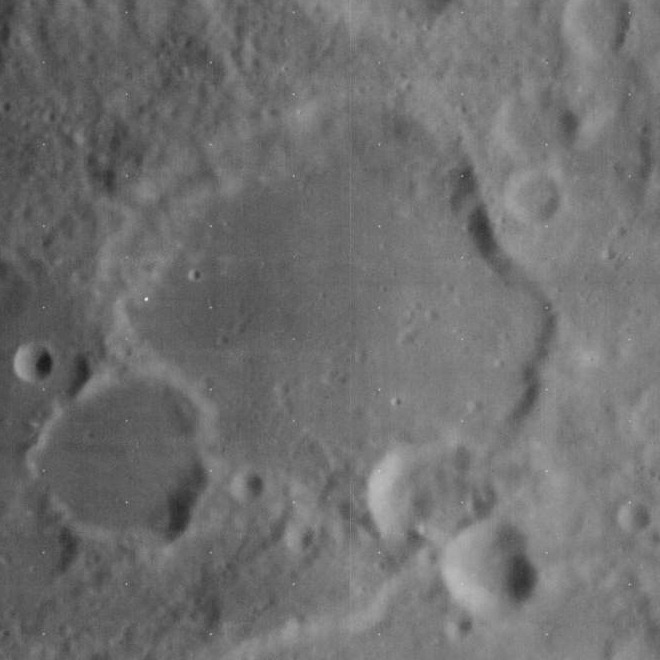
- Lunar Orbiter 4 image
- Coordinates: 42.42°N 60.81°E
- Diameter: 61.31 km (38.10 mi)
- Depth: 1.7 km
- Colongitude: 300° at sunrise
- Eponym: Michael Schumacher; Heinrich C. Schumacher

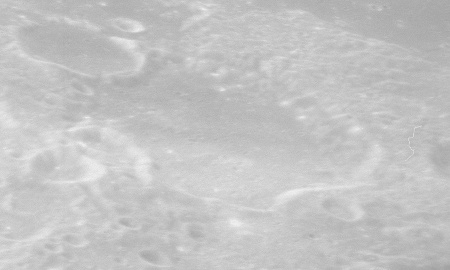
Oblique view from Apollo 16

Schumacher is a lunar impact crater that lies in the northeast part of the Moon, just to the north of the larger walled plain Messala. It was named by the IAU in 1935.

The rim of Schumacher forms an eroded ring that is broken along the western side by the flooded crater Schumacher B. There is a low terrace along the northwestern inner wall. The rim is also notched along the eastern side by a pair of outward bulges. The interior floor of this crater has been resurfaced by basaltic lava, and now forms a level, nearly featureless plain. The floor is somewhat darker in the western half, which the albedo in the eastern half matches the surrounding lunar terrain.

Schumacher and Messala are separated by a rough strip of terrain less than 10 kilometers across, and bisected by a pair of small, co-joined craters. The northern member of this pair lies across the southern rim of Schumacher, and intrudes into the interior floor.

== Satellite craters ==
By convention these features are identified on lunar maps by placing the letter on the side of the crater midpoint that is closest to Schumacher.

Schumacher	Latitude	Longitude	Diameter
B	42.1° N	59.4° E	24 km
