= Burckhardt (crater) =

Lunar impact crater

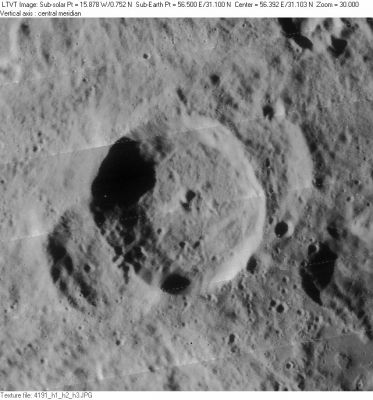
- Coordinates: 31.11°N 56.39°E
- Diameter: 54.36 km (33.78 mi)
- Depth: 4.8 km (3.0 mi)
- Colongitude: 304° at sunrise
- Eponym: Johann K. Burckhardt

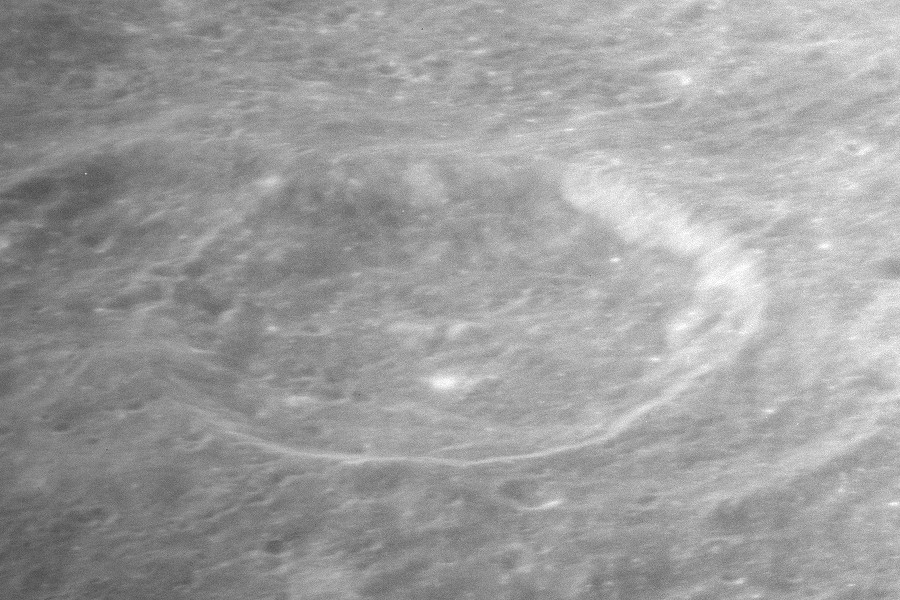
Oblique view from Apollo 16

Burckhardt is a lunar impact crater that is located in the northeast part of the Moon. It lies between the craters Geminus just to the north and Cleomedes to the south.

This impact feature lies across two slightly smaller craters on opposite sides, producing an interesting looking triple-crater formation. Burckhardt E is overlaid by the southwest quadrant of Burckhardt, while Burckhardt F is overlaid by the northwest quadrant. The rim of Burckhardt is generally circular but somewhat irregular in form. There is a central rise near the midpoint of the crater floor.

This crater is named after German astronomer Johann K. Burckhardt (1773-1825). His name was introduced into lunar nomenclature by German astronomer J. H. von Mädler during the 19th century. Its designation was formally adopted by the International Astronomical Union in 1935.

== Satellite craters ==
By convention these features are identified on lunar maps by placing the letter on the side of the crater midpoint that is closest to Burckhardt.

Burckhardt	Latitude	Longitude	Diameter
A	30.5° N	58.8° E	28 km
B	29.9° N	60.1° E	11 km
C	31.6° N	59.0° E	6 km
E	30.6° N	55.7° E	39 km
F	31.4° N	57.2° E	43 km
G	32.1° N	57.5° E	7 km
