= Burkhardt Öller =

German footballer

Personal information
- Date of birth: 9 November 1942
- Place of birth: Germany
- Date of death: 16 July 2014 (aged 71)
- Height: 1.87 m (6 ft 2 in)
- Position: Goalkeeper

Youth career
- TSV Dungelbeck
- VfB Peine

Senior career*
Years	Team	Apps	(Gls)
–1966	VfB Peine		
1966–1967	Eintracht Braunschweig Amateure		
1967–1971	Eintracht Braunschweig	22	(0)
1971–1972	Hannover 96	8	(0)
- * Club domestic league appearances and goals

Burkhardt Öller (9 November 1942 – 16 July 2014) was a German football goalkeeper.

== Career ==
In 1966, Öller was discovered by Bundesliga side Eintracht Braunschweig while playing for VfB Peine in the third tier Amateurliga Niedersachsen. He subsequently joined the club's reserve side, and in 1967 was promoted to Eintracht's first team. In Braunschweig Öller was the back-up keeper to West German international Horst Wolter. He left the club in 1971, joining league rivals Hannover 96, before retiring from professional football after one season in Hannover. In total Öller played 30 games during his five seasons in the Bundesliga. He died in July 2014.
