= Burckhardt Compression =

Swiss firm specialising in reciprocating compressors

- Type: Aktiengesellschaft
- Traded as: SIX: BCHN
- ISIN: CH0025536027
- Industry: Compressor technology
- Founded: 1844
- Headquarters: Winterthur, Switzerland
- Key people: Fabrice Billard (CEO), Jacques Sanche (Chairman of the Board of Directors)
- Products: Reciprocating compressors
- Revenue: CHF 1.057 billion (2025)
- Number of employees: 3305 (2025)
- Subsidiaries: Prognost Systems GmbH; SAMR Métal Rouge; Shenyang Yuanda Compressor
- Website: https://www.burckhardtcompression.com

Burckhardt Compression AG is a Swiss-based international company specialising in reciprocating compressors. It develops, manufactures and sells reciprocating compressor systems for the process and energy industries, including oil, gas and hydrogen. In addition, the company provides maintenance, upgrades and lifecycle services for installed equipment. Burckhardt Compression is considered to be among the world market leaders in the field of compressors.

The company has locations in Europe, Asia and North America and operates in more than 80 countries. Since 2006, Burckhardt Compression has been listed on the Swiss stock exchange.

== History ==
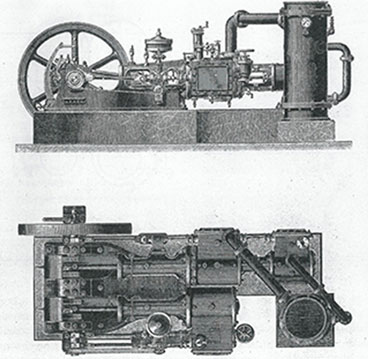
First Reciprocation Compressor 1883

=== 1844-2002: Maschinenfabrik Burckhardt ===
Burckhardt Compression, formerly known as Maschinenfabrik Burckhardt, was founded in Basel as a mechanical workshop by Franz Burckhardt in 1844. The company worked in the field of compressors and vacuum pumps from 1878, under the direction of Burckhardt's son, August Burckhardt. Early compressors from 1913 reportedly delivered 4350 psig (300 bar), which increased to 58,000 psig (4000 bar) by 1948 through the development of high-pressure technology.

In 1969, Maschinenfabrik Burckhardt became part of the manufacturer Sulzer, at which point a second production plant was opened in Winterthur. In 2000, all business activities were combined in Winterthur. The Basel site was closed and in 2001, the headquarters were relocated to Winterthur.

=== Since 2002: Burckhardt Compression AG ===
Following a management buyout in June 2002, the company was renamed Burckhardt Compression AG, and a holding structure was put in place, under the name Burckhardt Compression Holding AG. In June 2006, an initial public offering (IPO) (VTX:BCHN) took place. In 2007, the company built the world's most powerful single frame Hyper compressor with 27,500 kW.

In December 2015, Burckhardt Compression acquired a 40% stake in Houston-based Arkos Field Services, a provider of gas compression services and components. The Swiss company bought an additional 20% stake in Arkos in 2019.

In March 2016, the company acquired a majority stake in Shenyang Yuanda Compressor, a leading Chinese manufacturer of reciprocating compressors, thereby gaining local market proximity and expanding the portfolio to cover different market needs.

In September 2016, the company acquired IKS Industrie- und Kompressorenservice GmbH based in Bremen and in June 2017, Burckhardt Compression strengthened its presence in Canada through the acquisition of CSM Compressor Supplies & Machine Work Ltd based in Edmonton and Drumheller, Alberta.

In March 2020, the company acquired the global compressor business from The Japan Steel Works. In December 2021, the company expanded its service business in the maritime and petrochemical industries by acquiring 100% shares in Mark van Schaick BV, based in Rotterdam, the Netherlands.

In 2023, Burckhardt Compression fully acquired Arkos Field Services and integrated it into its operations. In April of the same year, the company acquired Thailand-based SPAN Maintenance and Service Co. Ltd. and established Burckhardt Compression (Thailand) Co. Ltd. through this acquisition. The acquisition of the Thai-based Burckhardt-authorised service partner increased the company's position in Southeast Asia and included taking over two dozen employees.

In 2025, Burckhardt Compression acquired the American company Advanced Compressor Technology (ACT), with sites in Illinois and Texas. In the same year, the company opened two new service centres in Ontario and Pennsylvania.

== Company structure ==
Burckhardt Compression is headquartered in Winterthur near Zurich and employed more than 3,300 people globally in 2025, generating revenue of CHF 1.057 billion. The company is active in over 80 countries and has production and assembly facilities in countries including Switzerland, China, India, the United States, and South Korea.

== Products and usage ==
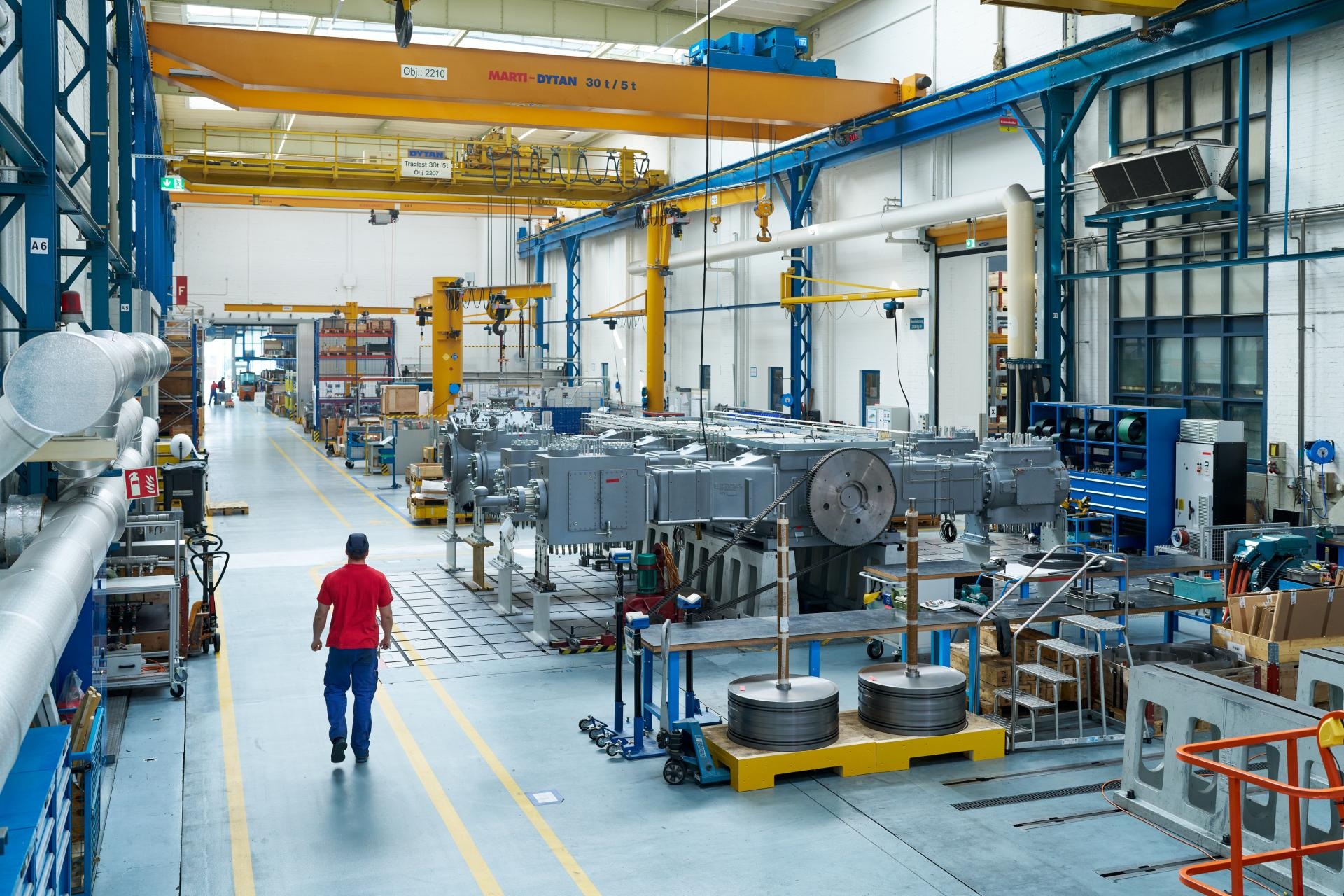
Compressor Workshop Assembly Hall in Winterthur

=== Products ===
Burckhardt Compression manufactures labyrinth compressors, process gas compressors, hyper compressors, and fuel gas compressors. It is the only company globally that produces all four types of these compressors, which are essential for compressing, cooling, or liquefying gases such as hydrocarbons and industrial gases.

Reciprocating compressors are the company's core products. One of the product lines is Laby compressors, which are used, among other applications, in liquefied natural gas terminals and on ammonia bunkering vessels. Burckhardt Compression's hyper compressors are high-pressure reciprocating machines used in petrochemical plants to compress ethylene at pressures of up to 3,500 bar, for example in the production of LDPE and EVA polymers. A subsidiary of Burckhardt Compression is Prognost Systems GmbH, based in Rheine, Germany, which provides automated condition monitoring of rotating machinery such as compressors and gearboxes.

=== Usage ===
Burckhardt Compression's products are used across the energy and process industries, particularly for gas compression in production, transportation and storage applications. The company's technologies are used in hydrogen, ammonia, and liquefied natural gas infrastructure. Further application areas include the chemical and petrochemical industries, as well as the processing of alternative and renewable gases such as biogas.

== Awards ==
In 2025, Burckhardt Compression won the Swiss Manufacturing Award.
