= Cleomedes (crater) =

Crater on the Moon

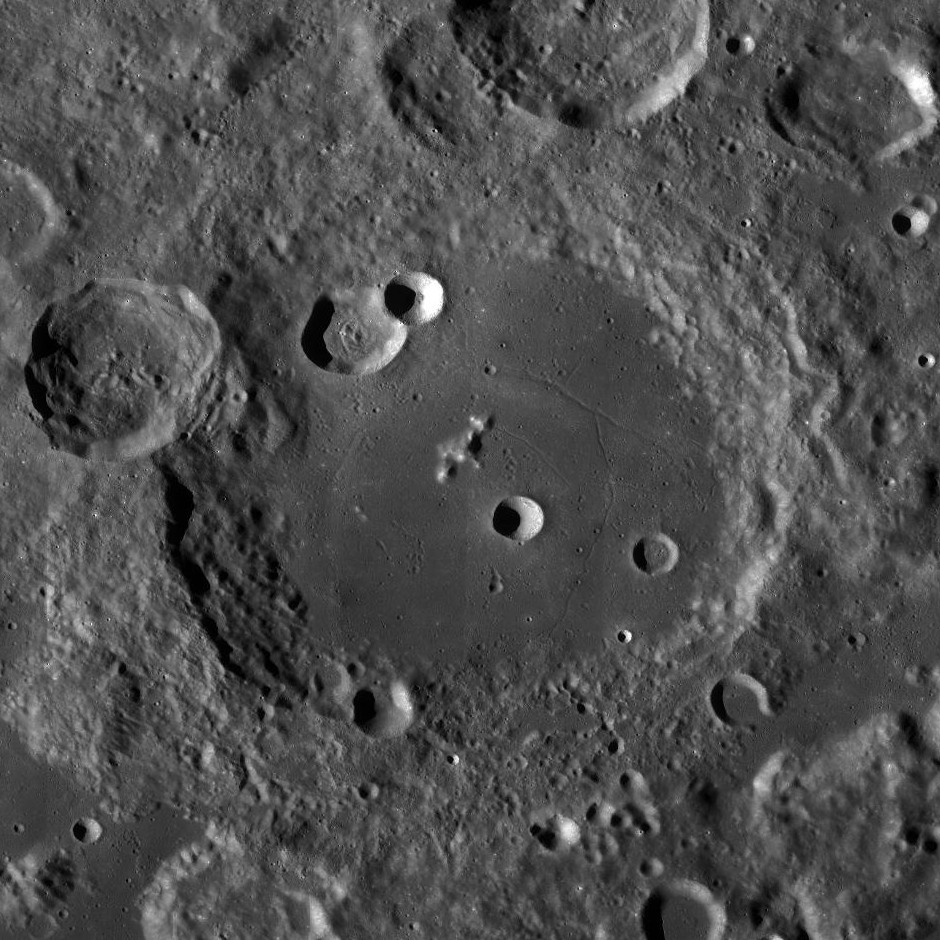
- LRO mosaic
- Coordinates: 27.60°N 55.50°E
- Diameter: 130.77 km (81.26 mi)
- Depth: 2.7 km (1.7 mi)
- Colongitude: 304° at sunrise
- Formation: Nectarian
- Eponym: Cleomedes

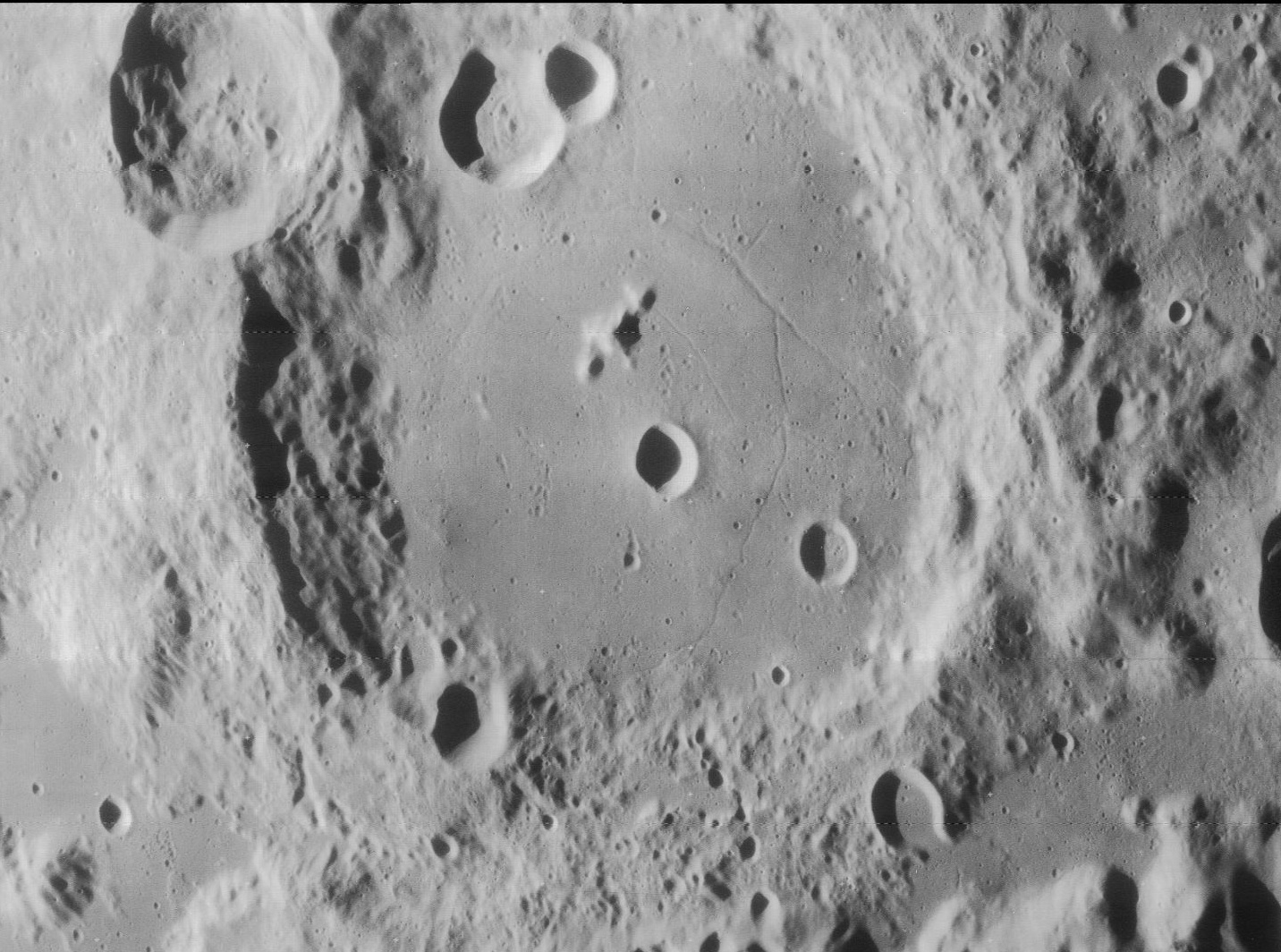
Oblique Lunar Orbiter 4 image

Cleomedes is a prominent lunar impact crater located in the northeast part of the visible Moon, to the north of Mare Crisium. It is surrounded by rough ground with multiple crater impacts. The irregular crater Tralles intrudes into the northwest rim. To the east is Delmotte. North of Cleomedes is a triple-crater formation with Burckhardt occupying the center.

On the lunar geologic timescale, Cleomedes is one of the largest craters of Nectarian age. The outer wall of Cleomedes is heavily worn and eroded, especially along the southern part of the wall. Cleomedes C lies across the south-southwest rim. The crater floor is nearly flat, with a small central peak to the north of the midpoint, forming a linear ridge toward the north-northeast. The infrared spectrum of pure crystalline plagioclase has been identified on the central peak. There are several notable craterlets on the floor, including a pair of overlapping craters just inside the northwest rim.

A rille named Rima Cleomedes crosses the northern floor, running southeast from the northwest rim. This rille branches in a fork after crossing the crater mid-line. Smaller clefts lie in the southeast part of the floor. A pair of lunar domes have been identified to the south of Cleomedes crater.

This formation is named after the Greek astronomer Cleomedes (unkn-c. 50 B.C.). His name was included in the lunar nomenclature of the Italian astronomer Giovanni B. Riccioli in 1651. Its designation was formally adopted by the International Astronomical Union in 1935.

== Bright satellite crater Cleomedes A ==
Before and during full moon, the bright and white looking bowl-shaped satellite crater Cleomedes A, on the northern section of the floor of Cleomedes itself, is an eye catcher for telescopic observers of the region north of Mare Crisium. The brightness of Cleomedes A is also noticeable on the photographic version of chart LAC 44 (page 88) in The Clementine Atlas of the Moon (Ben Bussey / Paul D. Spudis).

== Satellite craters ==
By convention, these features are identified on lunar maps by placing the letter on the side of the crater midpoint that is closest to Cleomedes.

Cleomedes	Latitude	Longitude	Diameter
A	28.9° N	55.0° E	12 km
B	27.2° N	55.9° E	11 km
C	25.7° N	54.9° E	14 km
D	29.3° N	61.9° E	25 km
E	28.6° N	54.4° E	21 km
F	22.6° N	56.9° E	12 km
G	24.0° N	57.3° E	20 km
H	22.4° N	57.6° E	6 km
J	26.9° N	56.8° E	10 km
L	23.8° N	54.4° E	7 km
M	24.2° N	51.6° E	6 km
N	24.8° N	52.5° E	6 km
P	24.8° N	56.4° E	9 km
Q	24.9° N	56.9° E	4 km
R	29.5° N	60.2° E	15 km
S	29.5° N	59.0° E	8 km
T	25.8° N	57.7° E	11 km
