= Lacus Temporis =

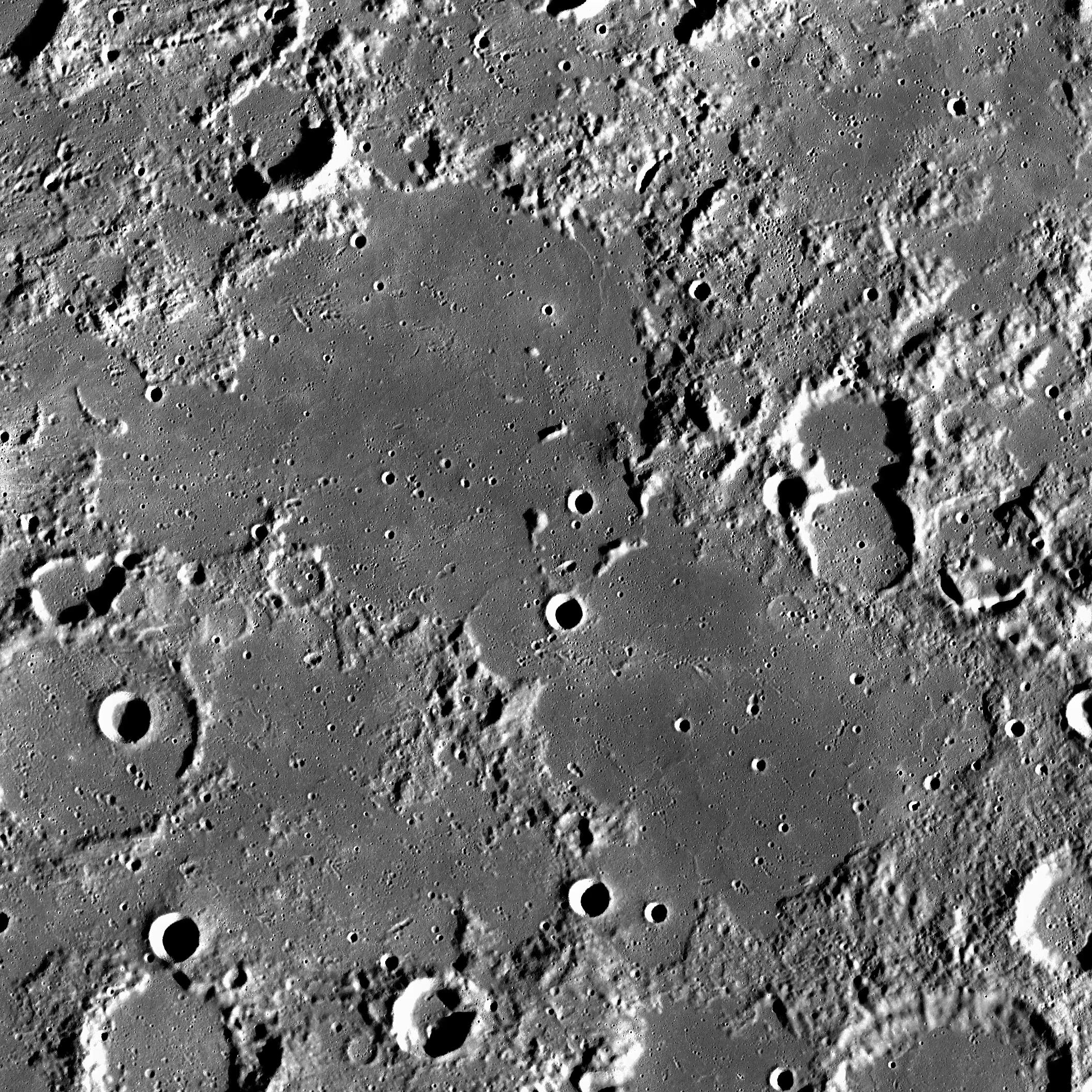
- Lunar Reconnaissance Orbiter mosaic
- Coordinates: 46.77°N 56.21°E
- Diameter: 205 km (127 mi)
- Eponym: Lake of Time

Lacus Temporis (Latin temporis, Lake of Time) is a small lunar mare that is located in the northeastern quadrant of the Moon's near side. The selenographic coordinates of this feature are 46.77°N 56.21°E, and it lies within a diameter of 205 km. It was named by the IAU in 1976.

This small mare is composed of two large, roughly circular patches of relatively smooth surface, with a pair of small, cup-shaped craters located prominently at their intersection. Both of these regions of basaltic lava covered surface have some smaller side lobes, which are most likely impact features that have become flooded.

Just to the southwest of this feature is the crater Chevallier and to the southeast lies Carrington.

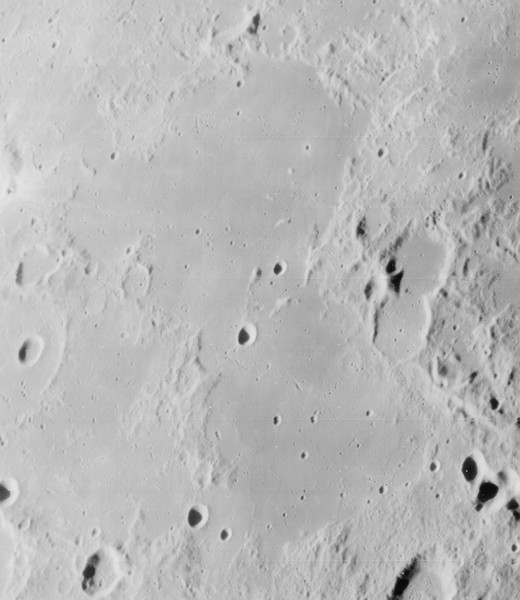
Oblique Lunar Orbiter 4 image

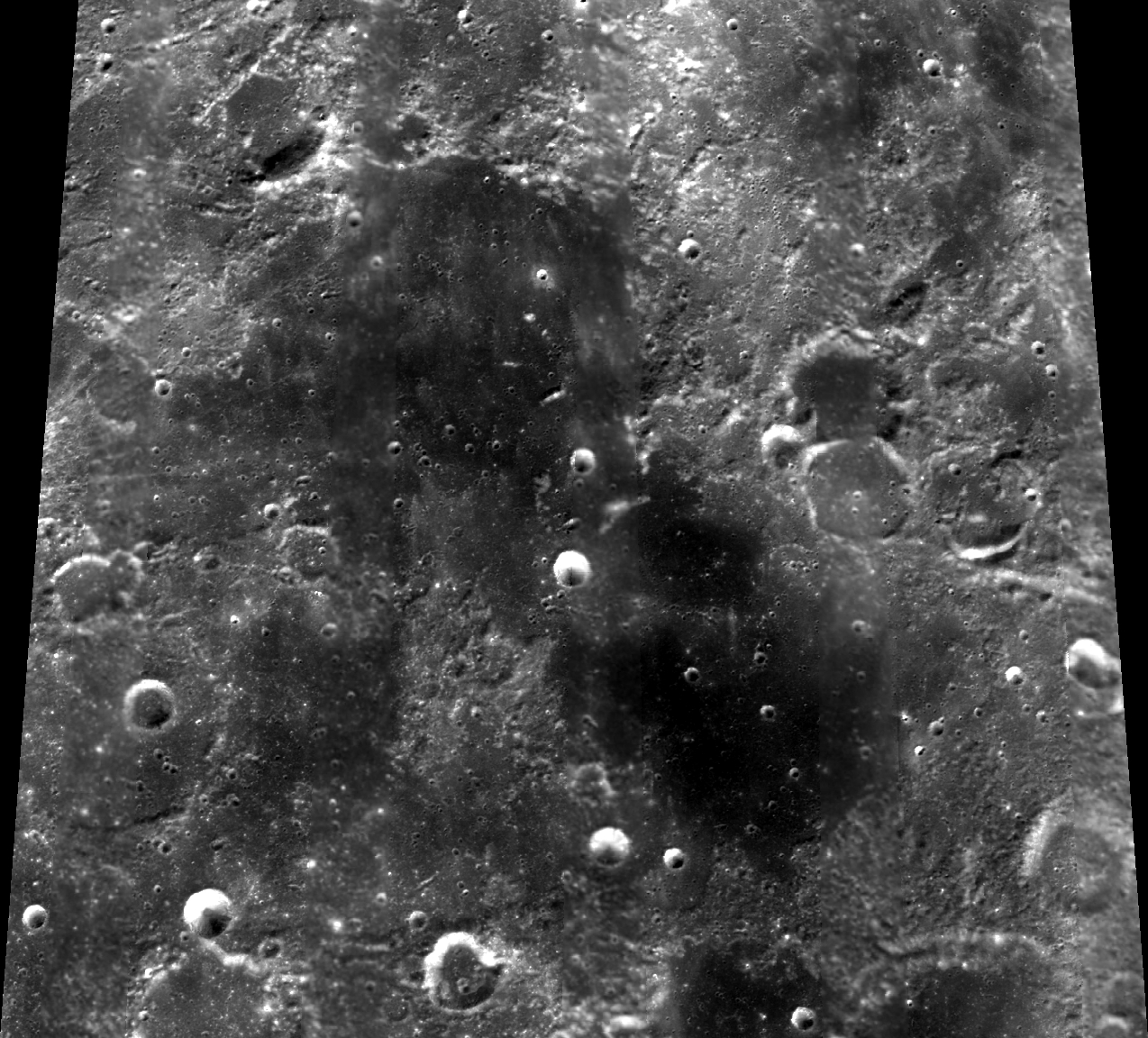
Clementine mosaic, at high sun angle

== See also ==
- Volcanism on the Moon
