= Portrait of Erasmus =

Portrait of Erasmus may refer to:

- Portrait of Erasmus (Dürer), a 1526 copper engraving by Albrecht Dürer
- Portrait of Erasmus of Rotterdam, a 16th-century painting by Hans Holbein the Younger
