= Georg Schmidt (art historian) =

Swiss art historian (1896–1965)

- Born: March 17, 1896; Basel, Switzerland
- Died: May 26, 1965 (aged 69); Basel, Switzerland
- Spouse: Annie Sophie Kohl (m. 1927)

Georg Schmidt (March 17, 1896 – May 26, 1965) was a Swiss art historian. He was director of the Kunstmuseum Basel from 1939 to 1961.

== Life ==
Georg Schmidt was the son of Carl Schmidt (1862–1923), professor of geology at the University of Basel, and his mother Charlotte Hudtwalker, who came from Hamburg. He was a younger brother of the architect Hans Schmidt (1893–1972).

Schmidt studied philosophy, history, art history and literary history at the universities of Basel and Grenoble from 1914 to 1927 and received his doctorate in 1929 in Basel on Johann Jakob Bachofen's philosophy of history. In 1927, he married Annie Sophie Kohl. Schmidt was an art critic for the Basler Vorwärts. In 1933 he set up a contact point for refugees from Germany in the Zett House on Badenerstrasse. Among those he supported was the writer Friedrich Wolf. The exhibition "Facts about the Soviet Union", which he played a leading role in organizing in Basel in 1934, was much criticised.

== Works ==
From 1927 to 1939 Schmidt was assistant to the director of the Gewerbemuseum Basel, where in 1929 he showed an exhibition of works by Bauhaus artists. From 1921 to 1938 he wrote art criticism for the Basler Nationalzeitung and was librarian of the Basler Kunstverein. He was also an important mentor of the "Gruppe 33". Starting in 1923, Schmidt contributed to the architecture magazine Werk. Mies van der Rohe invited him to give lectures at the Bauhaus in Dessaut.

On March 1, 1939, Schmidt was appointed, against the will of the advisory commission, to succeed Otto Fischer as curator (director) of the Öffentliche Kunstsammlung Basel (Basel Art Museum). In the same year, with a special loan from the government, he acquired 21 works of art that the Nazis had removed from German museums as "degenerate art," eight at an auction in Lucerne and the rest directly from Berlin.

From 1946 to 1954, he supervised the estate of Ernst Ludwig Kirchner.

Georg Schmidt expanded the modern art department. In 1949, he presented a Gauguin exhibition at the Kunstmuseum. In 1950 he bought two paintings (La Table and Portrait d'Annette) for the Emanuel Hoffmann Foundation, and a bronze sculpture (Place, 1948-1949, 63 × 44 × 21 cm, for 4800 Swiss francs), bringing Giacometti's first works into a Swiss public collection. In 1961, Franz Meyer became his successor. Maria Netter was Schmidt's assistant from 1944 to 1945.

From 1958 until his death in 1965, he held a professorship at the Academy of Fine Arts in Munich.

== Publications (selection) ==
- (mit Hans Mühlestein) Ferdinand Hodler 1853–1918. Sein Leben und sein Werk. Rentsch, Erlenbach 1942; Unionsverlag, Zürich 1983, ISBN 3-293-00020-7.
- Schriften aus 22 Jahren Museumstätigkeit. Phoebus-Verlag, 1964
- Kleine Geschichte der Modernen Malerei. Friedrich Reinhardt, Basel 1998, ISBN 3-7245-0037-8.

== Literature ==
- "Schmidt, Georg" in German, French and Italian in the online Historical Dictionary of Switzerland.
- Robert Hess: Zur Erinnerung an Prof. Dr. Dr. h.c. Georg Schmidt (1896–1965), Direktor der Öffentlichen Kunstsammlung Basel 1939–1961. In: Basler Stadtbuch 1966, S. 194–200.
- Georg Kreis: «Entartete Kunst» in Basel. Eine Chronik ausserordentlicher Ankäufe im Jahr 1939. In: Basler Zeitschrift für Geschichte und Altertumskunde, Bd. 78, 1978, S. 163–191 (doi:10.5169/seals-117978#224).
- Ivonne Höfliger (Hrsg.): Gruppe 33. Editions Galerie zem Specht, Basel 1983, ISBN 3-85696-006-6.
- Gerd Presler; Georg Schmidt (1896–1965), in: Otto Mueller zum achtzigsten Todestag. In: Jahrbuch der Otto Mueller-Gesellschaft, Band I, Weimar 2010, S. 72–77.
- Jürg Düblin: «Saubere Marxisten»: Nähe und Distanz zum Kommunismus in Georg Schmidts Wirken als Kulturjournalist. In: Basler Zeitschrift für Geschichte und Altertumskunde. Band 122, 1922, S. 219–252.

== See also ==
- Degenerate Art auction
