= Hans Schmidt (architect) =

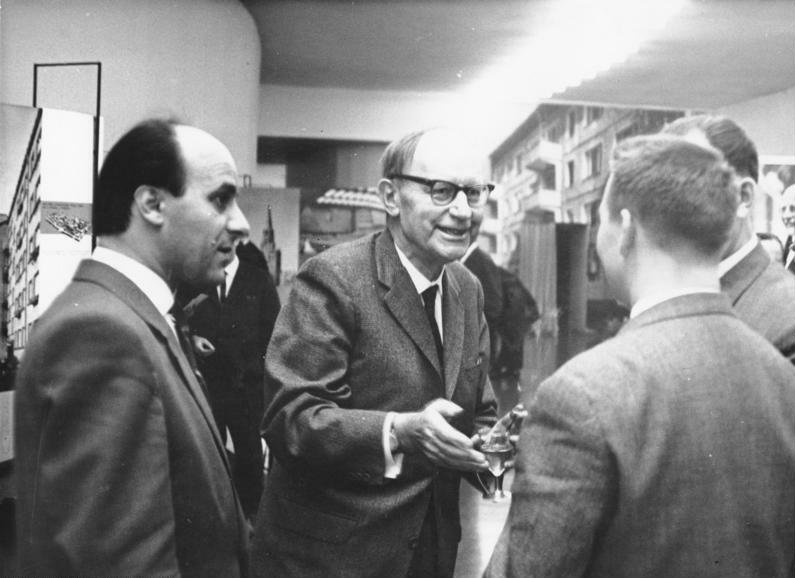
Hans Schmidt (center) in 1965

Johannes "Hans" Schmidt (10 December 1893, Basel – 18 June 1972) was a Swiss architect and urban planner.

== Biography ==
Hans Schmidt was born in to the family of the geologist Carl Schmidt. He was the older brother of the art historian Georg Schmidt.

Schmidt studied history, art history, and archaeology for a semester at the University of Geneva. He then completed an apprenticeship as a draftsman in the Zurich office of Curjel & Moser before turning to the study of architecture under Carl Hocheder and Friedrich von Thiersch at the Technical University of Munich in 1913. In 1917, Schmidt transferred to ETH Zurich to study under Karl Moser and Hans Bernoulli, where he earned his degree as a certified engineer in 1918.

After a brief period working for Bernoulli and Ernst Eckenstein, Schmidt moved to the Netherlands in 1920. There he was influenced by Jacobus Johannes Pieter Oud and in 1922 obtained a position with the renowned architect Michiel Brinkman. In 1924 he returned to Switzerland. His first completed project was the Hodel House in Riehen, finished in 1925. After founding an architectural firm with Paul Artaria in 1926, Schmidt designed and built various residential and housing developments with them until 1930, establishing himself as one of the leading architects of the New Objectivity movement.

In 1928 he became one of the founders of the Congrès International d'Architecture Moderne (CIAM) and travelled to Moscow in 1930 as an advisor to the People's Commissariat of Heavy Industry. In the following years, he participated in the planning and construction of several industrial cities in the Soviet Union, returning to Switzerland in 1937. In 1944, he was one of the co-founders of the Labour Party, which he represented in the Grand Council of the Canton of Basel-Stadt from 1944 to 1955.

In 1956, he accepted a position as chief architect at the Institute for Typification in East Berlin. In 1958, he was appointed director of the Institute for Theory and History of Architecture at the German Building Academy. In 1963, the Building Academy awarded him an honorary doctorate, and in 1968 he was awarded the Patriotic Order of Merit in Silver of the GDR. In 1969, upon his retirement, Schmidt returned to Switzerland, where he died three years later at the age of 78.
