= View to Infinity (Hodler) =

Painting series by Ferdinand Hodler

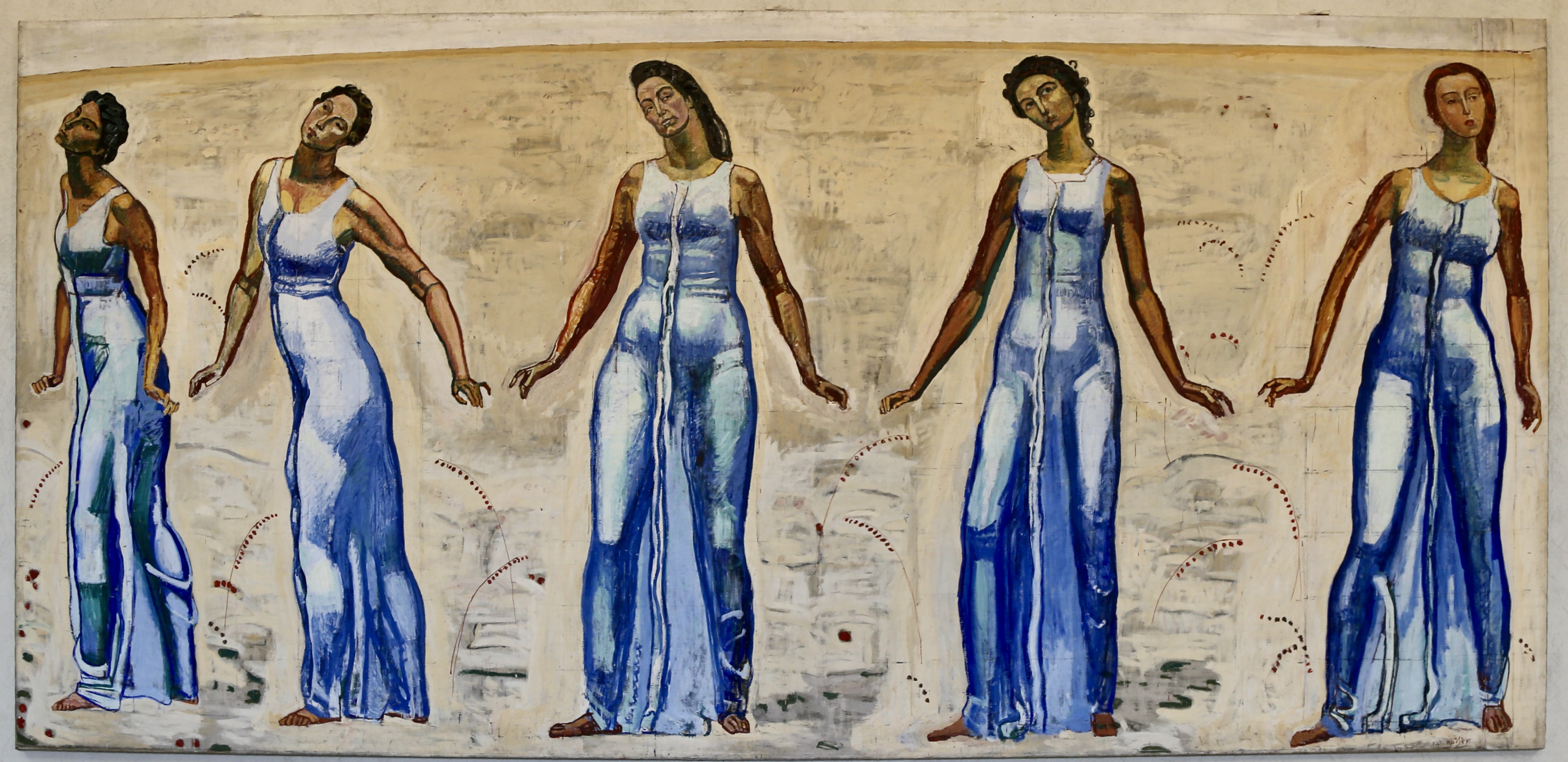
The version for Kunstmuseum Basel

View to Infinity are a series of paintings by Ferdinand Hodler of which he painted five versions. During their development he designed multiple drawing, sketches and paper forms to test their impressions. The painting of the first version took place between 1913 and 1917. It is now exhibited in the Kunstmuseum Basel, another one is exhibited in the Kunsthaus Zürich. A third, smaller and unfinished version is located in the Kunstmuseum Solothurn.

== Monumental version ==
The first version was initially meant for the Kunsthaus Zürich, which was inaugurated in 1910. The idea was that Hodler paints a mural for the second staircase. For this, Karl Moser, the architect for the Kunsthaus in Zurich, was inspired by the mural Puvis de Chavannes designed for the Museum of Fine Arts in Lyon. In November 1910, Hodler confirmed he would paint a mural for the southern wall of the staircase. Between early 1911 and 1913 he drew several sketches. The title "View into infinity" is for the first time recorded on a sketch from early 1913. Friends of his who had visited him in his workshop in Geneva, reported they saw a canvas with 4-5 figures. It is assumed Hodler decided on the motif of five female figures in long robes somewhen in the first months of 1913. Koloman Moser noted a size of about 2 and a half meters height and almost five meters width and the blue robes of the women. The version he mentioned was probably the unfinished version today deposited in the Solothurn Kunstmuseum. In September 1913, he eventually began with the larger version for the Kunsthalle in Zurich. For every figure he worked with a model. He prepared paper forms for each figure to test their impression. He initially wanted to hang View into Infinity in January 1915 in Zurich, but eventually did not present it before the art association. Instead he overpainted it and made it larger. The first final version was to be about four and a half meters high and almost nine meters wide. As he presented the version to the Art Society of Zurich in January 1916, they refused it for its sheer size. The quality of the painting was never in question, but it was considered too large and Hodler left with the order to paint a smaller version. Initially the art society wanted to keep the original version in Zürich, but upon Hodlers request for it be provided as a sample for the smaller version, the original version was returned.

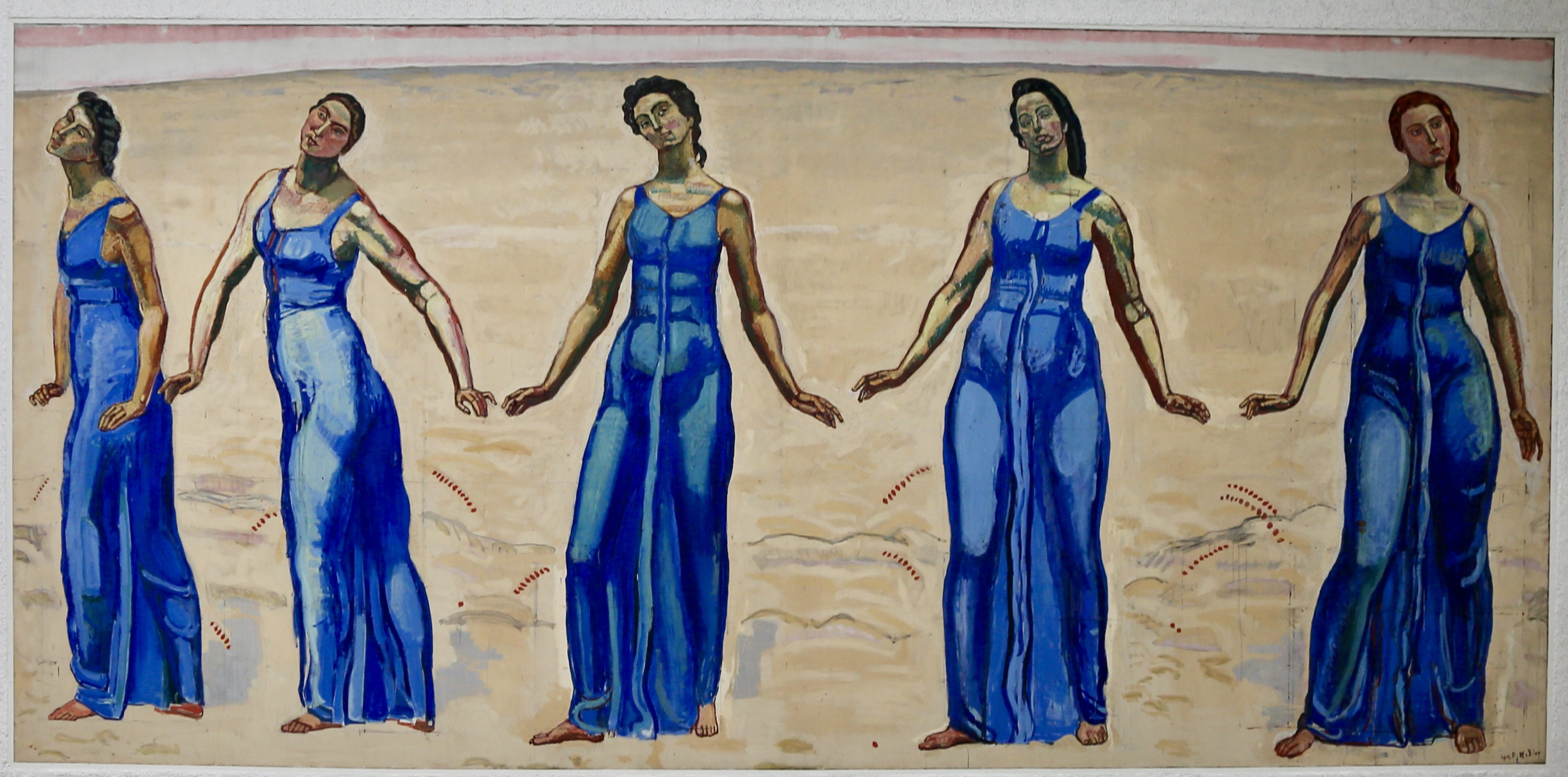
The Version for the Kunsthaus Zürich

The first version was then exhibited in the Kunsthalle Basel in spring 1917, and it was there, where he actually finished the work. Its exhibition there, raised a discussion over its purchase for Basel. Paul Ganz from the Kunsthalle Basel visited Hodler in Geneva and then the sum of 20'000 was mentioned. The first version was shown also in an exhibit in the Kunsthaus Zurich and there offered for 50'000, but Hodler preferred the 20'000 from Basel as he saw a public collection as the ideal location for the work. When in 1927 the Art Association of Basel was in financial difficulties, the work was bought for the Public Art Collection of Basel. In 1936, "View to Infinity" found its place in the newly inaugurated Kunstmuseum Basel.

=== Second version ===
The second version, which was to be trimmed for about 90 cm in height and 180 cm in width, he then did not plan to paint alone anymore but in collaboration with other painters. The second version was not an exact copy of the first, but he exchanged the central figure with the one to the right and replaced the fourth figure from right with a new model. In January 1917, the painting was finished and sent to Zurich.

== Other versions ==
A version dated to 1915 is today known as the Steiner version, and remained in possession of the Hodler family until 1958. It has the dimensions of over two and a half meters of width and about 130 cm (51 in) in height.

Another, slightly smaller version than the Steiner version, is known as the Hahnloser version due to its first owner, the Hahnloser-Bühler family from Winterthur, Switzerland. It was initially in the Kunstmuseum Winterthur, before Hodler sent it to Winterthur in 1916. In 1917 the painting was sent to Zurich for the Hodler exhibition in the Kunsthaus Zürich. In 1923, the Gallery Association of Winterthur purchased it from the Hahnloser-Bühlers and deposited it back in the Kunstmuseum Winterthur.

Hodler began work on an unfinished version in 1913, which has a height of about two and a half meters and a width of 475 cm (187 in). In 1917 it came into possession of the art collector Emma Schmidt-Müller. In 1918 the painting was deposited in the Kunstmuseum Solothurn where it was mostly forgotten by art historians.

== Reception ==
Hodler purposefully chose several figures for this painting. He mentioned in an interview that he was of the view that the depiction of the same thing in several versions, would deepen the impression. According to Hodler, the women stand before the bent horizon and observe the firmament from different points of view. For Oskar Bätschmann, with the six year long comparing of different figures and versions, Hodler was on a quest for the perfect masterpiece, but at the same time also conscious of the fate that this was impossible to accomplish. Bätschmann compares Hodlers View to Infinity to the Large Bathers by Paul Cézanne. The color of the robes is held in blue, the color of the sky and also a color which Hodler believed the human is best prepared to perceive in large amounts. The women gaze is directed to somewhere outside the painting, slightly upwards. Infinity was an issue with which Hodler had experimented also during his paintings depicting Lac Leman. For those paintings, he reasoned on the right size for the canvas.
