= Kunstmuseum Basel =

Art museum in Basel, Switzerland

Coordinates: 47°33′15″N 7°35′39″E

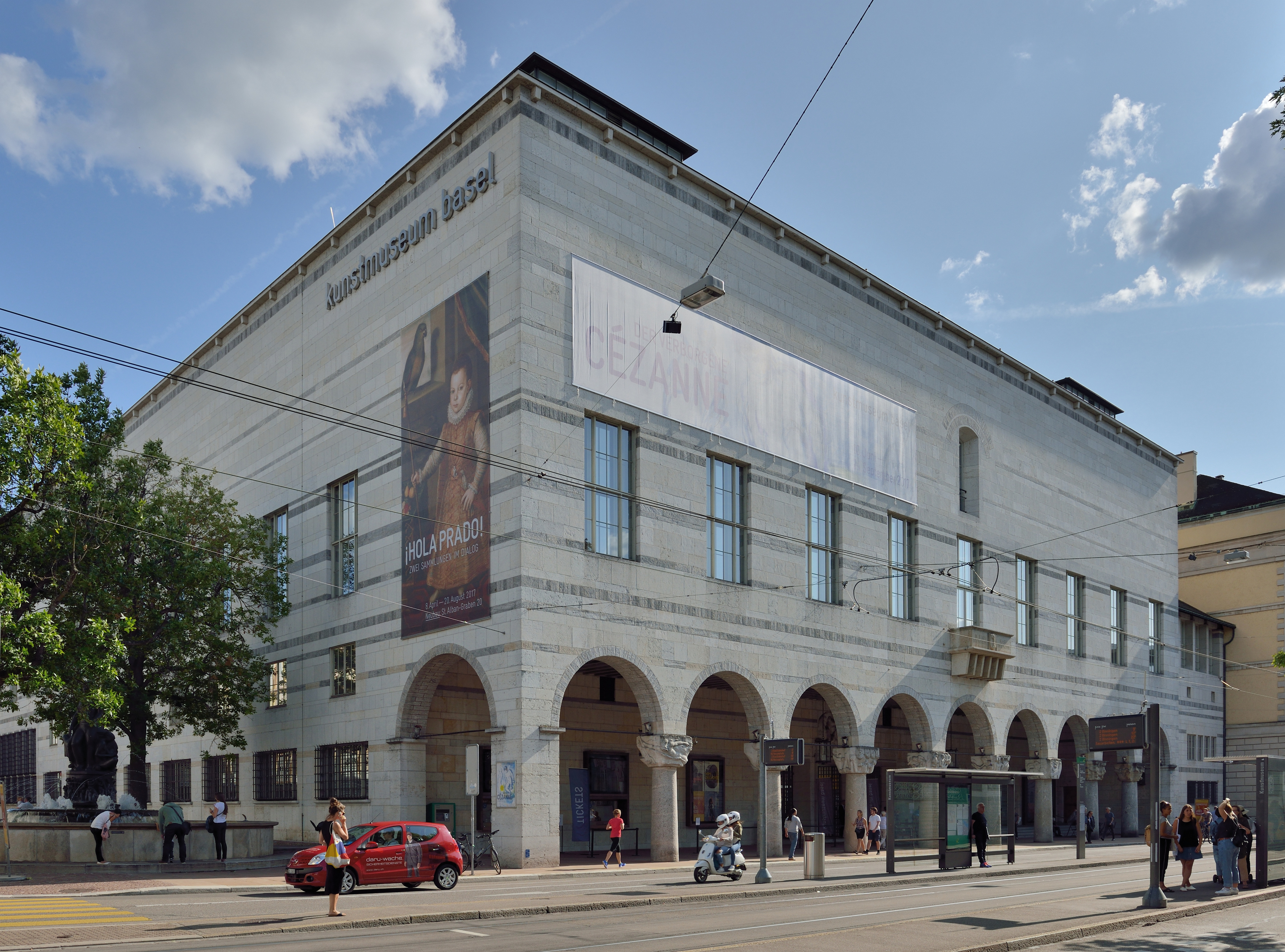
- The main building from 1931
- Established: 1661; 365 years ago
- Location: Basel, Switzerland
- Type: Art museum
- Director: Elena Filipovic
- Website: kunstmuseumbasel.ch

The Kunstmuseum Basel houses the oldest public art collection in the world and is generally considered to be the most important museum of art in Switzerland. It is listed as a Swiss heritage site of national significance.

Its lineage extends back to the Amerbach Cabinet, which included a collection of works by Hans Holbein purchased by the city of Basel and the University of Basel in 1661, which made it the first municipally owned and therefore open to the public museum in the world. Its collection covers a wide historic span, from the early 15th century up to the immediate present. Its various areas of emphasis give it international standing as one of the most significant museums of its kind. These encompass paintings and drawings by artists active in the Upper Rhine region between 1400 and 1600, as well as the art of the 19th to 21st centuries.

== Collection ==
The Kunstmuseum possesses the largest collection of works by the Holbein family. Further examples of Renaissance art include important pieces by such master artists as Konrad Witz, Hans Baldung (called Grien), Martin Schongauer, Lucas Cranach the Elder and Matthias Grünewald. The main features of the 17th and 18th centuries are the Flemish and Dutch schools (e.g. Peter Paul Rubens, Rembrandt, Jan Brueghel the Elder), German and Dutch still life painting. Key works from the 19th century include the Impressionists represented by Édouard Manet, Edmond Jean de Pury, Claude Monet, Paul Gauguin, Paul Cézanne as well as the paintings by Vincent van Gogh and Switzerland's Arnold Böcklin and Ferdinand Hodler. In the 20th century, the focus is on works of Cubism with Picasso, Braque and Juan Gris. Expressionism is represented by such figures as Edvard Munch, Franz Marc, Oskar Kokoschka, Bernard Buffet and Emil Nolde. The collection also includes works from Constructivism, Dadaism and Surrealism and American art since 1950. Further highlights are the unique compilations of works from Pablo Picasso, Fernand Léger, Paul Klee, Alberto Giacometti and Marc Chagall.

In the realm of more recent and contemporary art, the collection maintains substantial bodies of work by Swiss, German, French, Italian, and American artists, including Joseph Beuys, Andy Warhol, Jasper Johns, Georg Baselitz, A.R. Penck, Brice Marden, Bruce Nauman, Jonathan Borofsky, Roni Horn, Francesco Clemente, Mimmo Paladino, Enzo Cucchi, Martin Disler, Leiko Ikemura, Markus Raetz, Rosemarie Trockel and Robert Gober.

In 1975, the Dia Art Foundation installed Untitled (In memory of Urs Graf) by Dan Flavin in the museum's front courtyard and arcade gallery. This permanent, outdoor, installation was funded and installed by the Dia Art Foundation as its first major public work. It was subsequently gifted to the Kunstmuseum in 1980.

== History ==
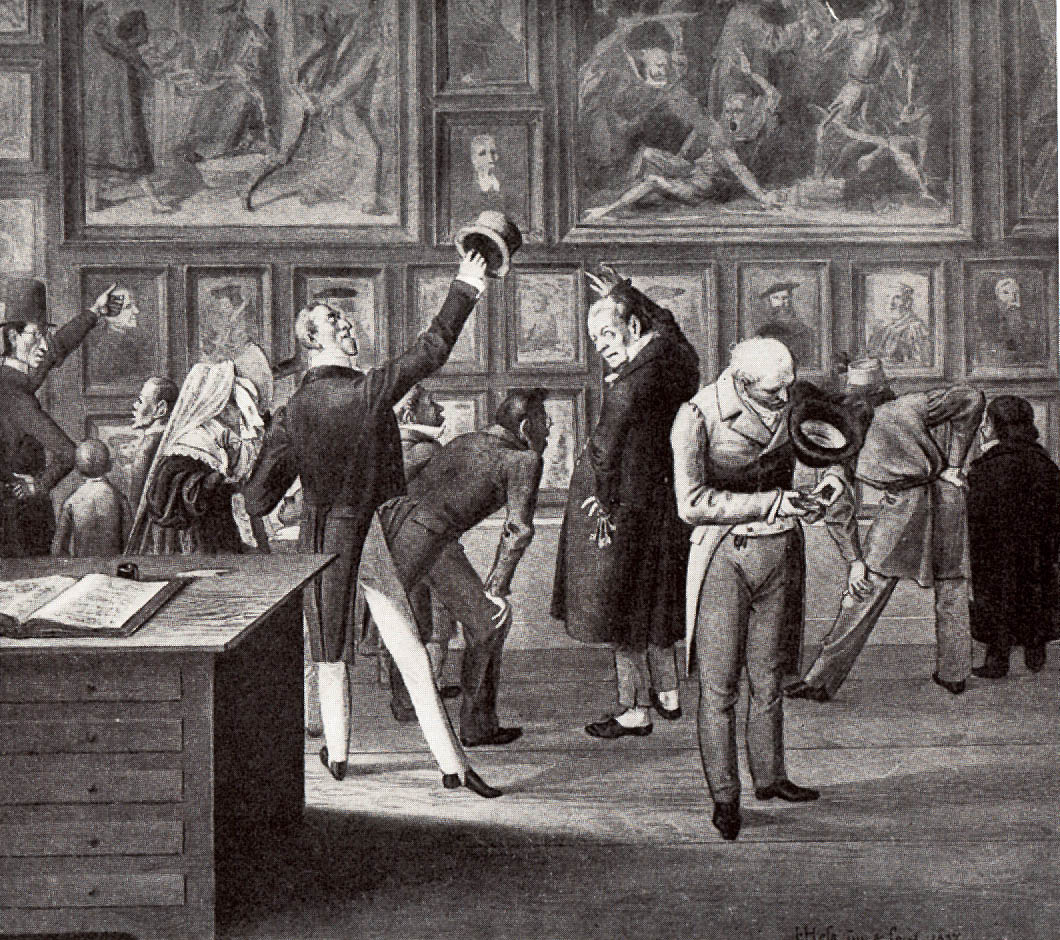
Paintings exhibited in the House zur Mücke (1837)

In 1671 the city of Basel decided to make the art collection of the Amerbach cabinet accessible to the public. The collection was exhibited in the House zur Mücke near the Munster of Basel and could be accessed by the public twice a week. In 1823 the public collection was joined with the before private Faesch Museum established by Remigius Faesch and in 1849 the collection moved into a larger building also near the Munster of Basel. In 1859, a new building for the museum was thought of, inspired by the paintings the Swiss painter Emilie Linder had annually deposited in the museum since 1847. As a possible location the building of the Common Readers Association was mentioned or also a return to the House zur Mücke was considered. The museum included several other academic departments. A move was seen to give the art collection more room and also enable an efficient rescue of the paintings in case of a fire. Until 1864, the museum included physical and chemical departments. In 1866, also the ethnographic and antiquarian departments were moved to another location following which the artworks received two more prominent rooms. The Gottfried Keller Foundation introduced the painting of Cows drinking in the Alps by Giovanni Segantini in 1904. The Birmann Fonds, which was established to purchase paintings of Swiss painters introduced modern painters and introduced the Lac Leman from Chebrous in 1905 and Rise in space in 1910 by Ferdinand Hodler, further The Bread by Giovanni Giacometti in 1908 and the Peasants Garden by Cuno Amiet in 1914. With the Village in Pontoise from Camille Pissarro, the first impressionist painting was introduced to the Museum in 1912.

In 1936, the Museum moved to its current location. In 1939 a large body of work by German-Jewish artists, whose paintings were considered to be degenerate art by the Nazi regime in Germany, were acquired for the Kunstmuseum under the director George Schmidt. They are on display in the museum up to this day. In 1980 the Museum joined forces with the Museum for Contemporary Art, which displays artworks from the 1960s onwards. It was the first museum focused on contemporary art at the time.

In 2006, the Swiss dealer Eberhard Kornfeld donated his Rembrandt collection, including more than 100 etchings, to the Kunstmuseum Basel.

More research is underway.

== Buildings ==
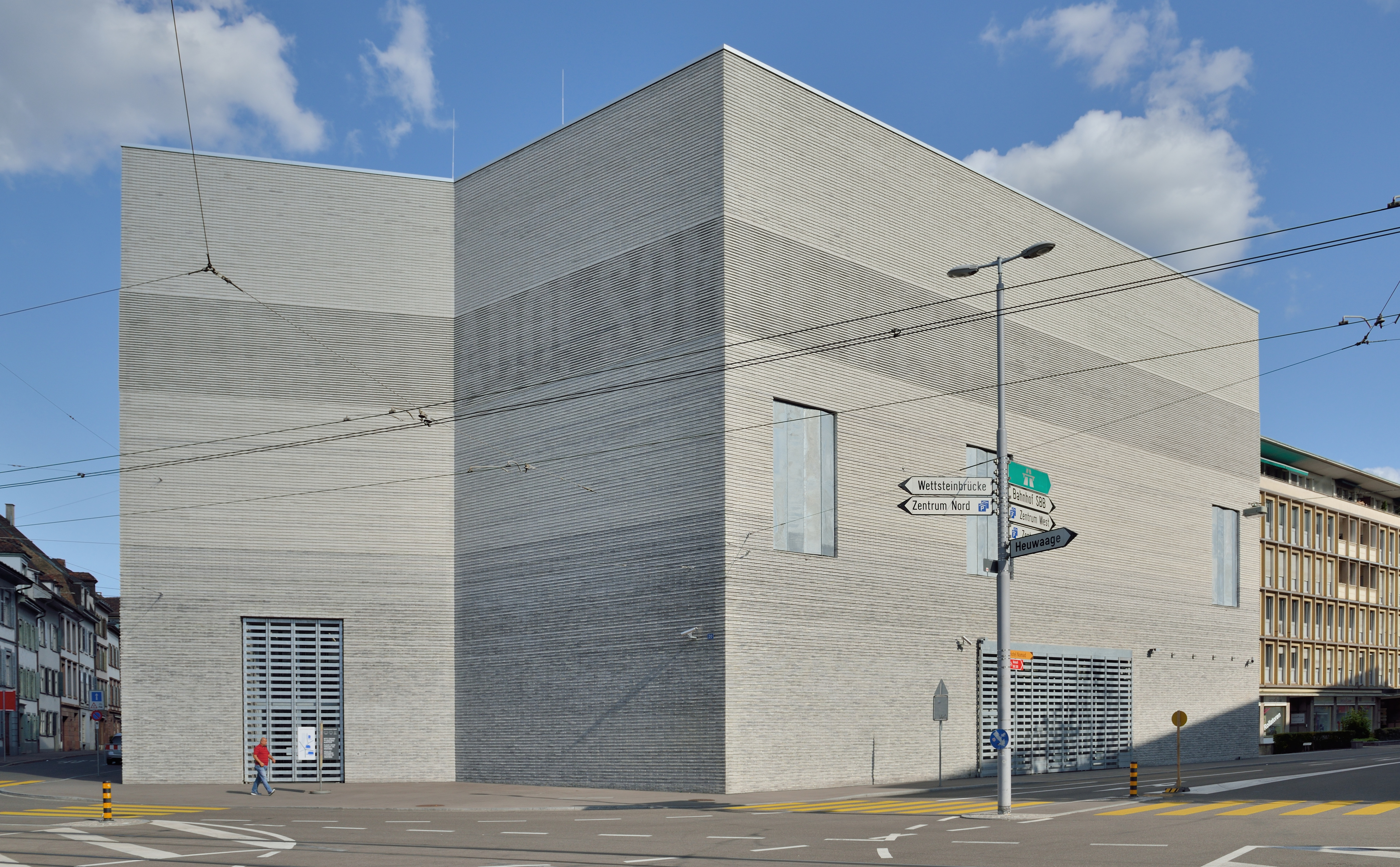
The new extension from 2016

The Kunstmuseum's current and main building was designed and constructed 1931-1936 by architects Paul Bonatz and Rudolf Christ, adjacent to the former building of the Swiss National Bank in Basel. In 1980, a building beside the Rhine in the St. Alban neighborhood was added as an additional location for the museum, the Contemporary Art Museum.

In 2008, the museum acquired land on the other side of Dufourstrasse and an architectural competition was held. With international star competitors, such as five Pritzker Prize laureates (Peter Zumthor, Zaha Hadid, Rafael Moneo, Tadao Ando and Jean Nouvel) — all pitching, eventually a young local firm, Christ & Gantenbein, won the project. The final design is an angled building, faced with concrete bricks, and at the same height as the original museum. The new building is joined with the main building through an underpass.

The new building was completed in April 2016 and its construction was funded by the Canton of Basel-Stadt and the Laurenz Foundation (Laurenz-Stiftung).

The extension adds 2,750 square meters of galleries, to a total of nearly 10,000 square meters. The original museum now houses art from the 15th century to 1950, with later works in the extension. The upper floor of the new building houses temporary exhibitions and the middle floor and part of the ground floor houses the permanent collection.

== Claims for restitution of artworks ==
In 2008, Basel rejected a restitution request for paintings by Edvard Munch, Max Beckmann, Marc Chagall and Henri Matisse from the heirs of Curt Glaser, saying "The Kunstmuseum paid prices typical for the time and our decision was that the Washington principles do not apply in this case." Twelve years later, after battling against restitution, the museum reached an agreement.

In 2012 the museum reached an agreement with the heirs of the painter Kazimir Malevich, whose Landscape with Red Houses it purchased from Marlborough Fine Art Ltd Gallery in London in 1964. The settlement concerned other artworks as well.

In 2020 the museum refused to restitute seven artworks that had belonged to Julius Freund.

The museum rejected a request made in 2022 to return the 1909 painting The muse inspiring the poet by Henri Rousseau, which had been owned by Lotte von Mendelssohn-Bartholdy, a Jewish collector who was fleeing the Nazis.

== Patrons of the arts ==
- Peter G. Staechelin
- Martin H. Burckhardt (1921–2007), Swiss architect and politician

== Visitors ==
In 2019, the Kunstmuseum had 265,000 visitors.

== Gallery ==
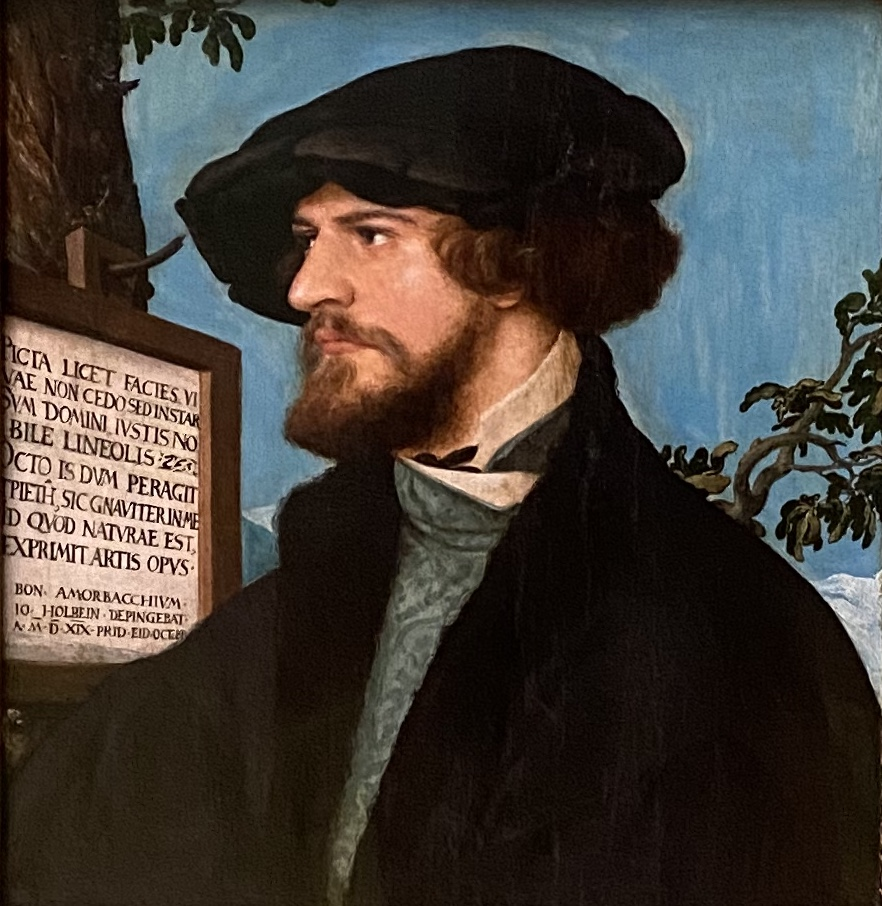
Hans Holbein the Younger Portrait of Bonifacius Amerbach

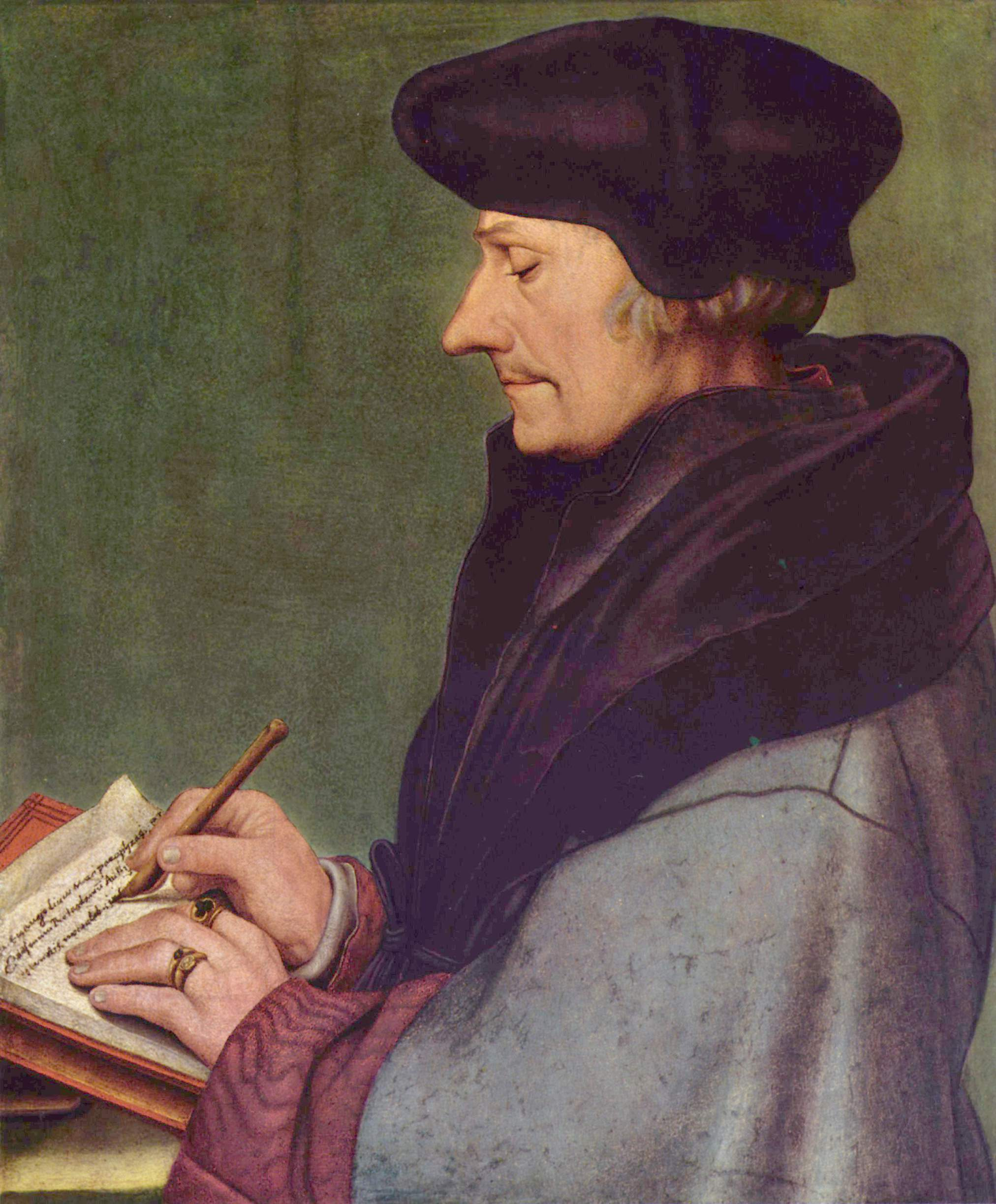
Hans Holbein the Younger, Portrait of Erasmus of Rotterdam (1523)

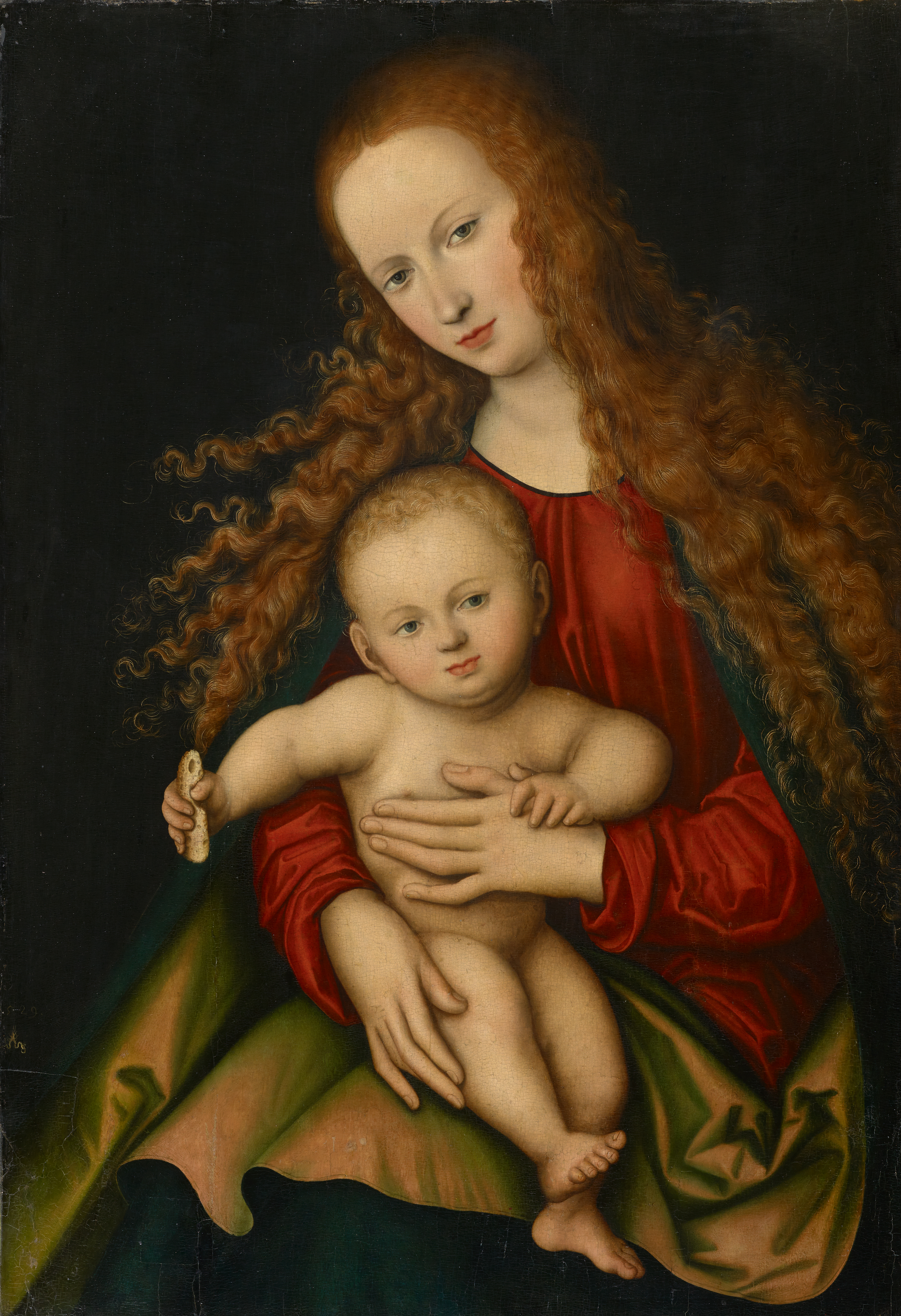
Lucas Cranach the Elder, Madonna with child (1529)

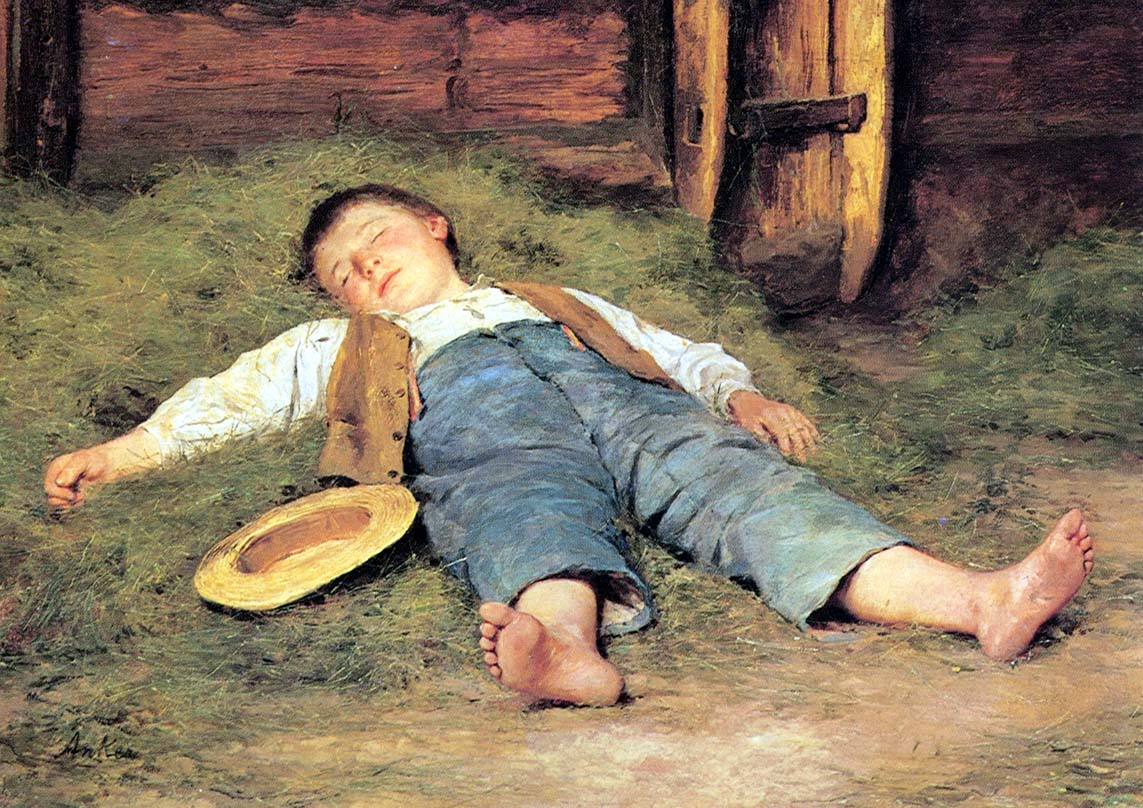
Albert Anker, Sleeping boy in the hay (1897)

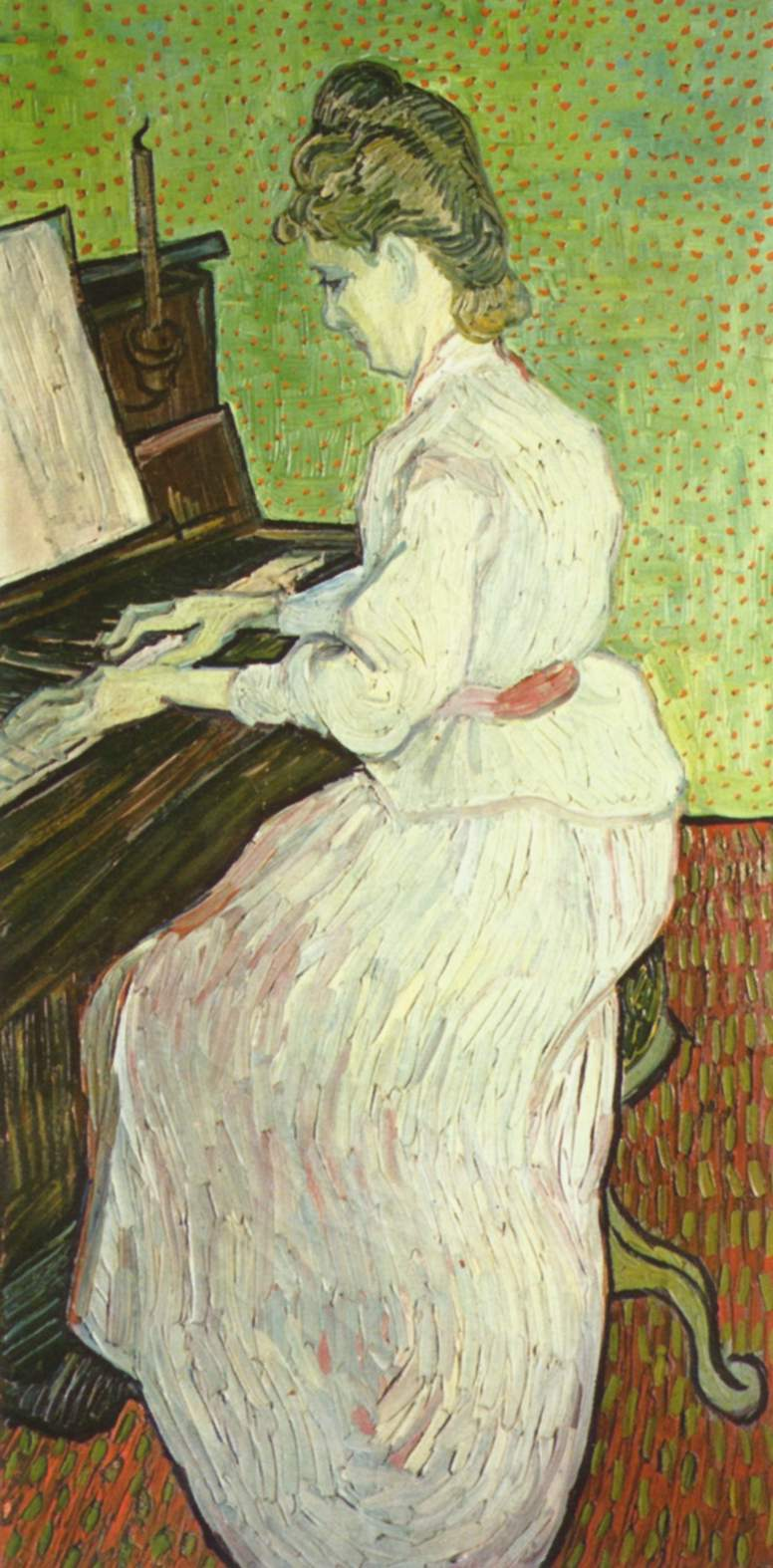
Vincent van Gogh, Marguerite Gachet at the Piano (1890)

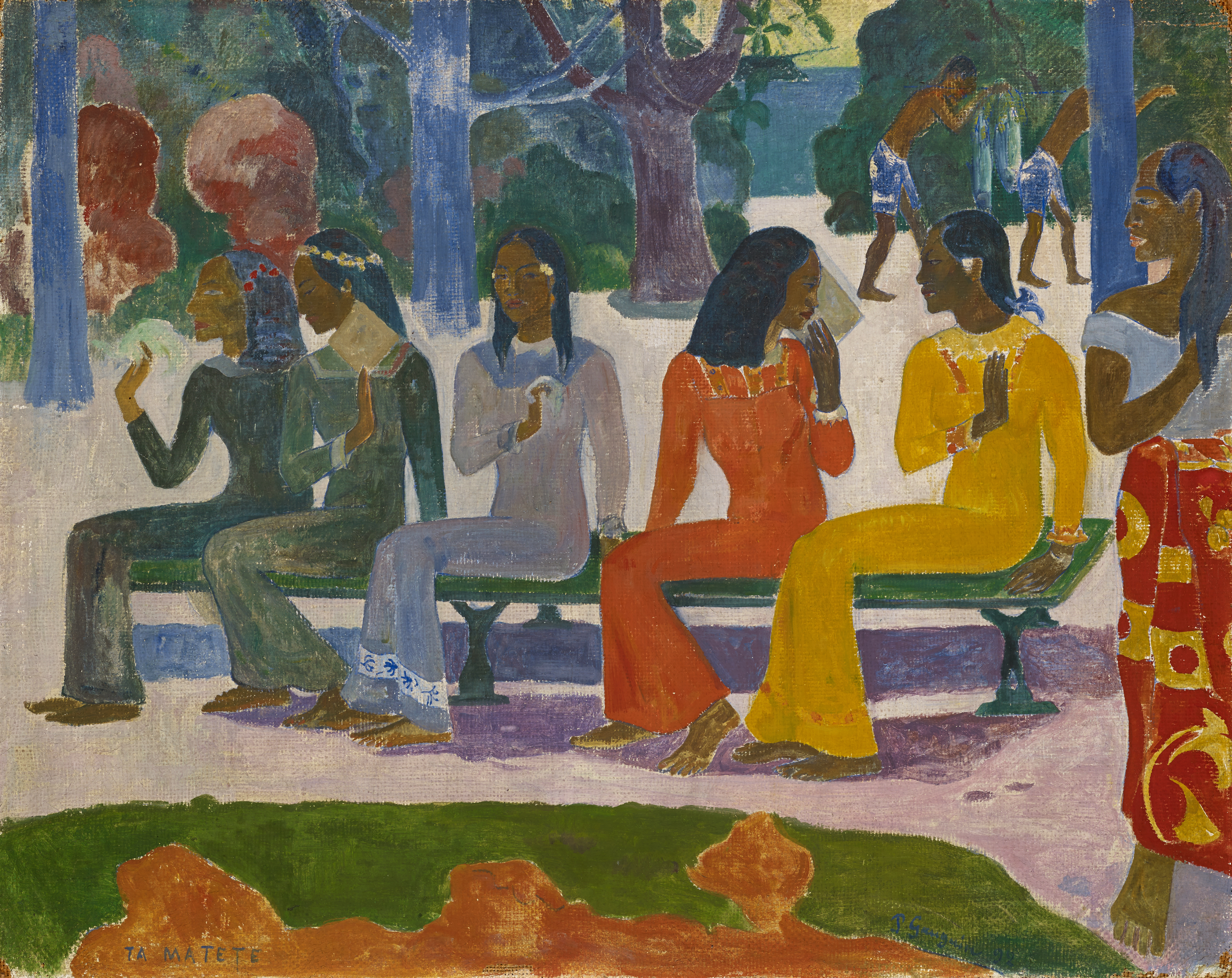
Paul Gauguin, Ta matete (The market) (1892)

Pablo Picasso, Les deux frères (The two brothers) (1905–06)

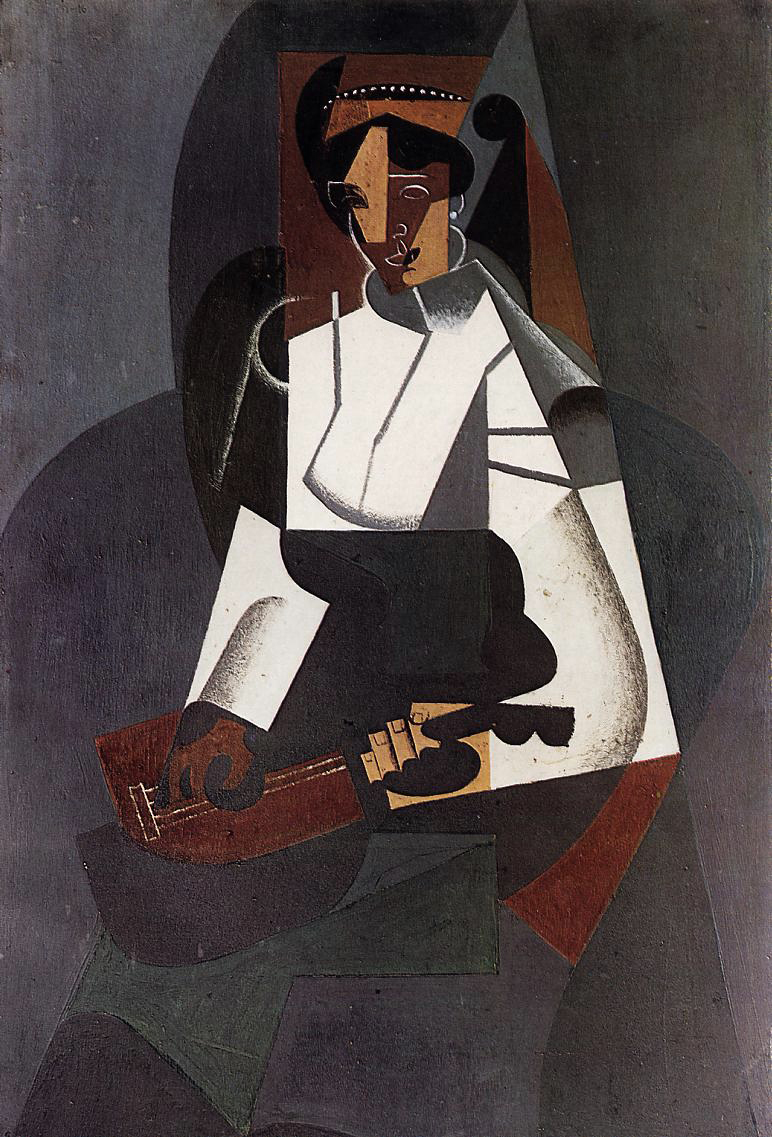
Juan Gris, La femme à la mandoline (Woman with Mandolin) (1916)

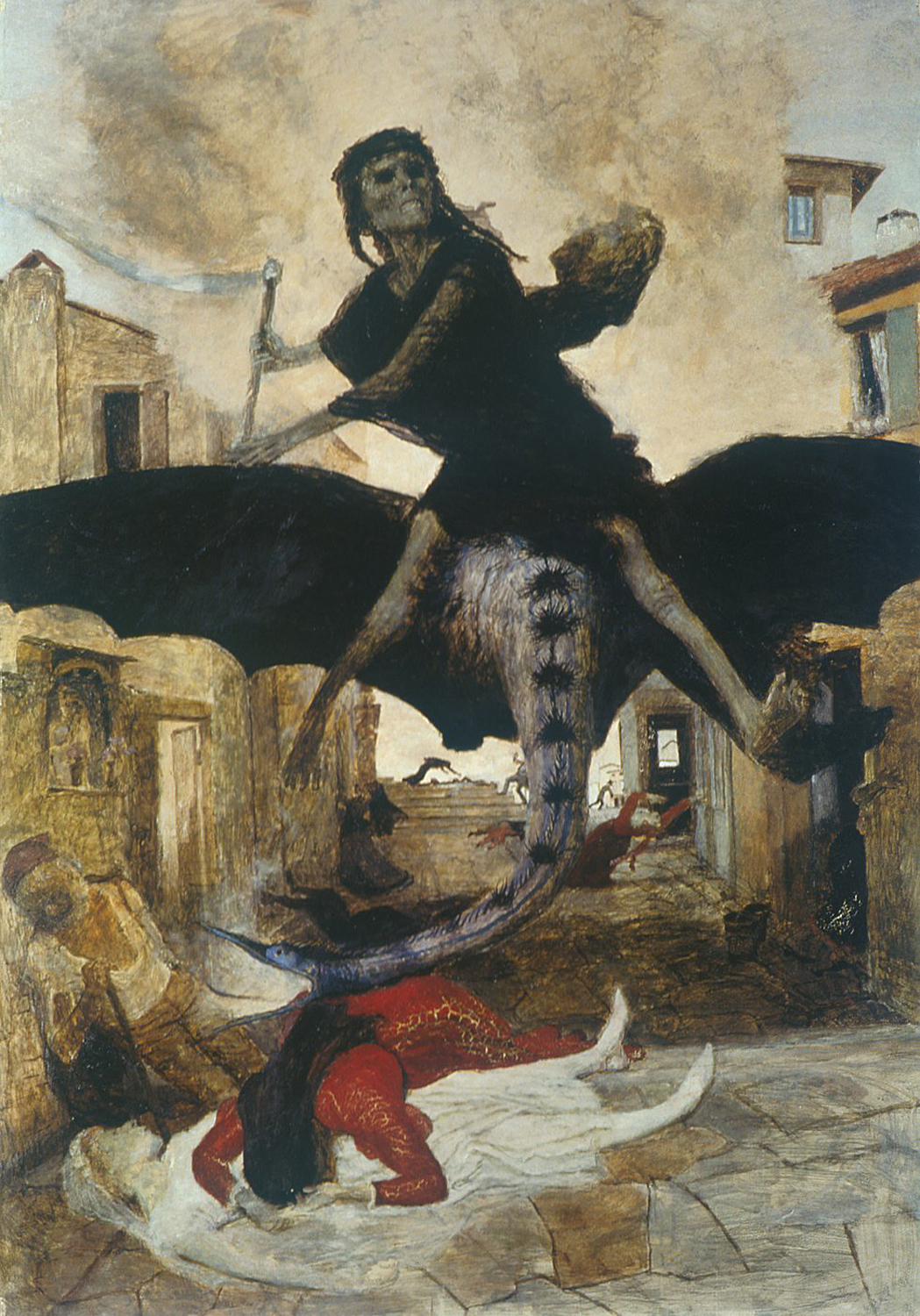
Arnold Böcklin, The Plague (1898)

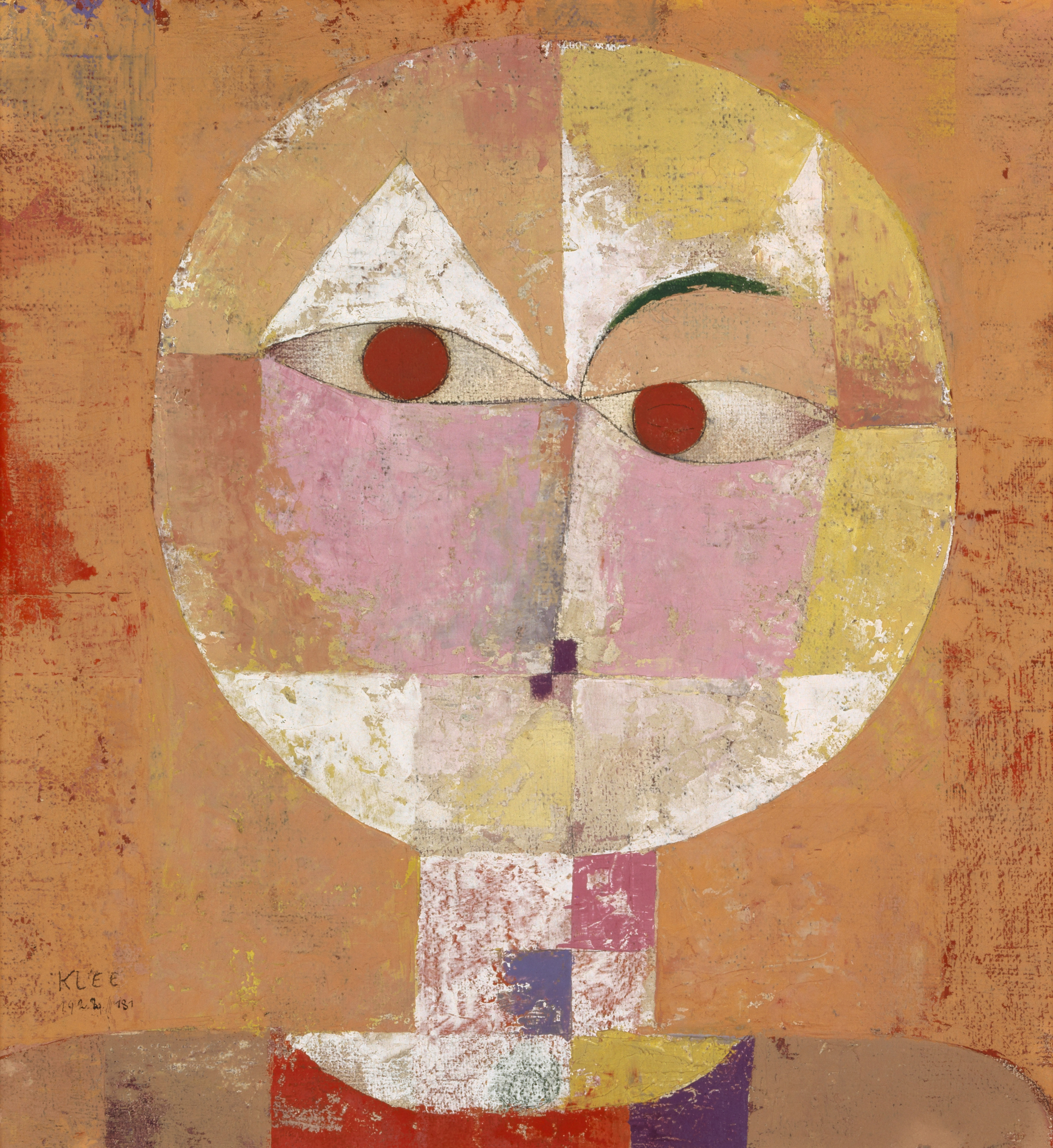
Paul Klee, Senecio (1922)

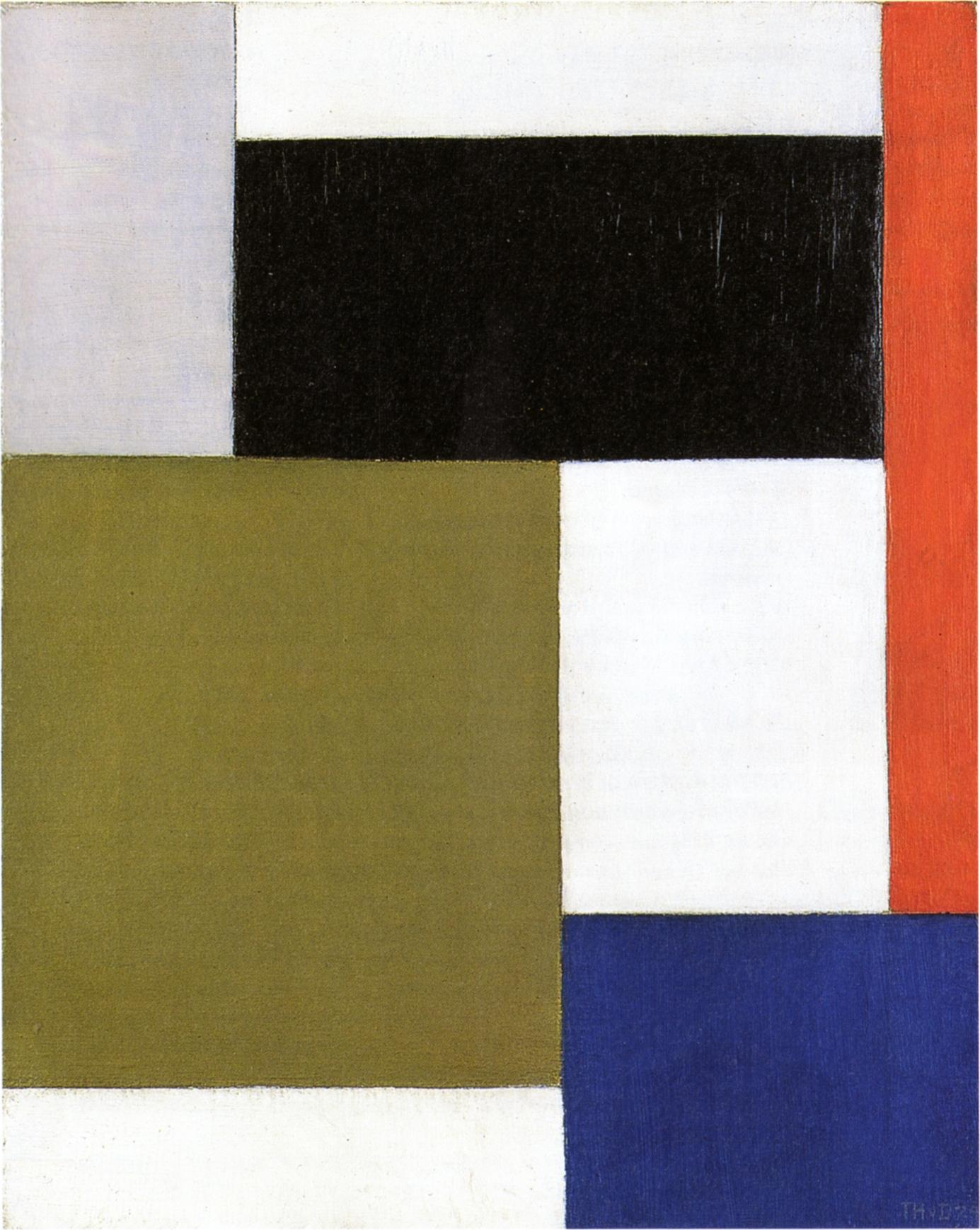
Theo van Doesburg, Composition (1923–1924)

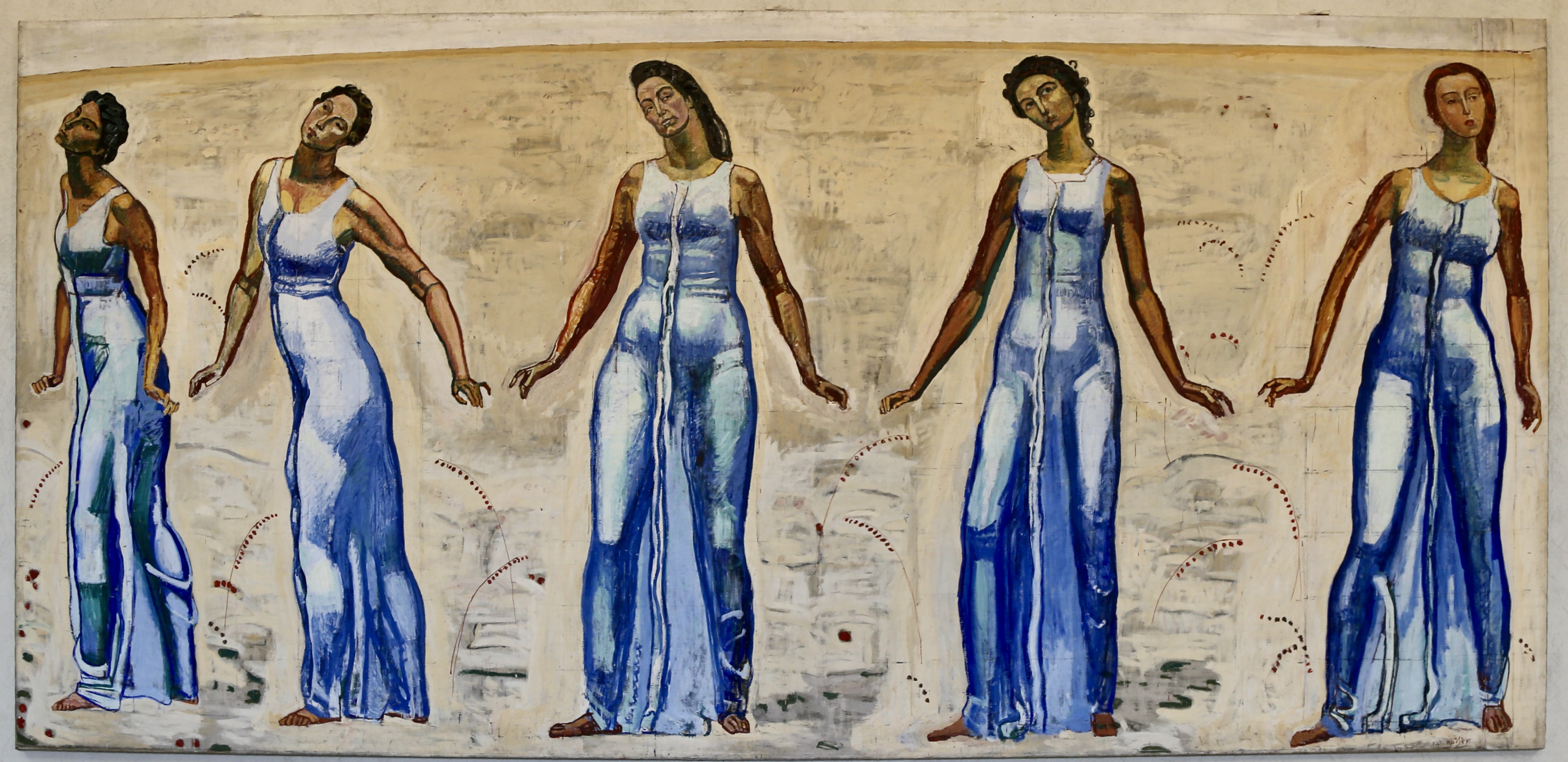
View to Infinity by Ferdinand Hodler

== See also ==
- List of largest art museums
- Raoul Albert La Roche, Swiss art collector and donor
- Louise Bachofen-Burckhardt, Swiss art collector and donor
- List of museums in Switzerland
