= Louise Bachofen-Burckhardt =

Swiss philanthropist

Louise Elisabeth Bachofen-Burckhardt
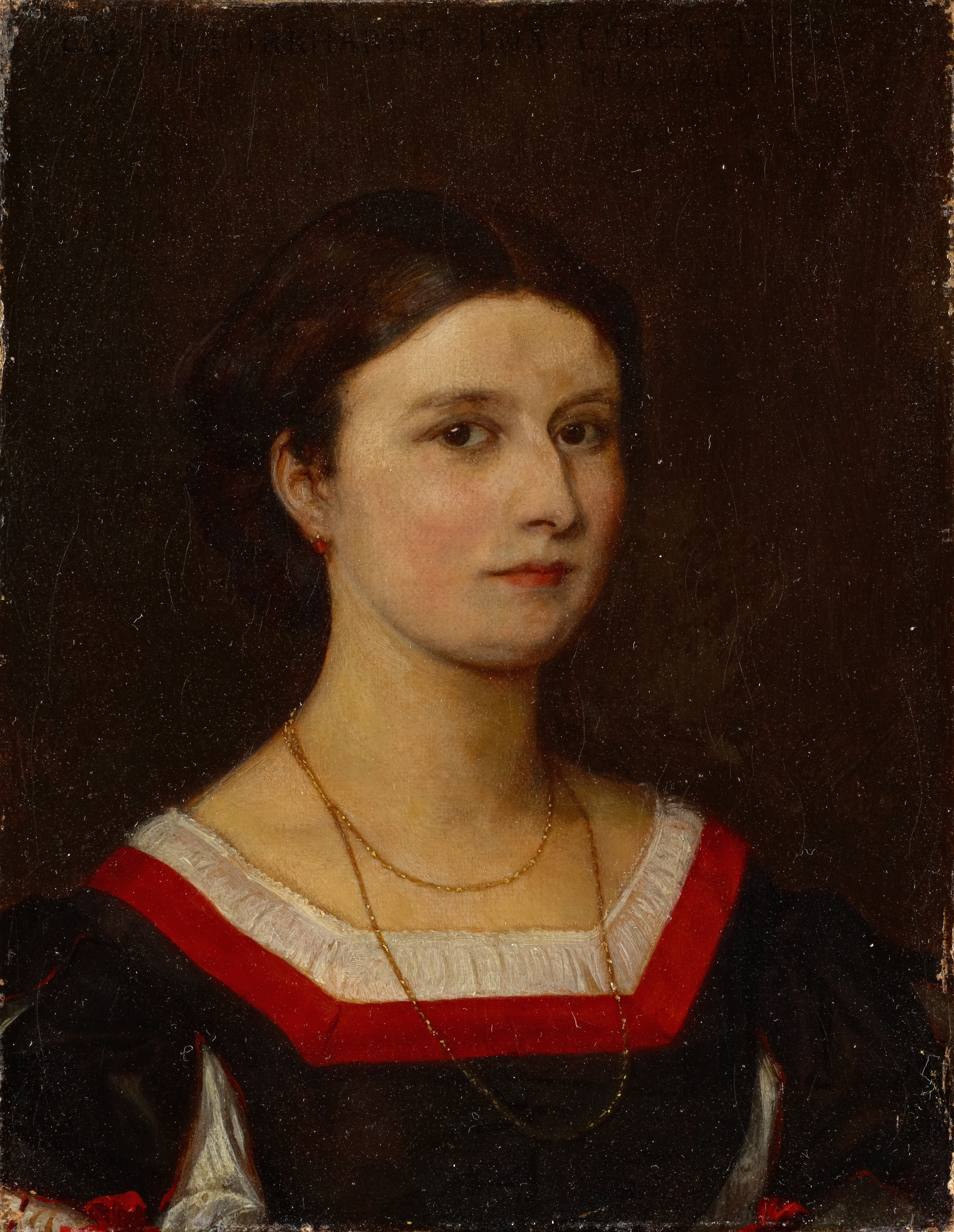
- Portrait of Louise Bachofen-Burckhardt, 1865, by Ernst Stückelberg
- Born: October 8, 1845
- Died: February 21, 1920 (aged 74)
- Spouse: Johann Jakob Bachofen

Louise Elisabeth Bachofen-Burckhardt (October 8, 1845 – February 21, 1920) was a Swiss philanthropist. She is known for her art collection that she bequeathed to the Kunstmuseum Basel in Switzerland. Her 1904 gift doubled the museum’s collection of Old Masters.

== Biography ==
Bachofen-Burckhardt was born in 1845 in the Daig. She married anthropologist and antiquarian Johann Jakob Bachofen at age 25. Her father died by suicide, her mother died in 1853 when she was eight, and her stepfather, a co-founder of the Basler Kunstverein, died ten years later. She was widowed at the age of 42. After her husband's death, she expanded his art collection with the assistance of German art historian Wilhelm von Bode, with the goal of transforming the City of Basel's public art collection.

During the last decades of her life, she collected about 300 paintings from the late Middle Ages to the 20th century, including works by artists Bartolomeo Vivarini, Jan Breughel the Elder, Hans Memling, Hans Schäufelin and Lucas Cranach the Elder. Some of her acquisitions, such as Hans Memling’s Saint Jerome in Penitence, were initially disputed but later recognised as major works.

In 1904, she donated all of the works to a foundation in her late husband's name, with the Kunstmuseum Basel as its sole beneficiary. Her collection was first catalogued in 1907 by Rudolf Burckhardt, who described the works in detail for the museum.

== Legacy ==
From 2019 to 2020, the Kunstmuseum Basel ran a special exhibition honouring Bachofen-Burckhardt, 100 years after her death.

== See also ==
- Art Basel
- Basel
