= Johann Jakob Bachofen =

Swiss jurist and philologist (1815–1887)

J. J. Bachofen
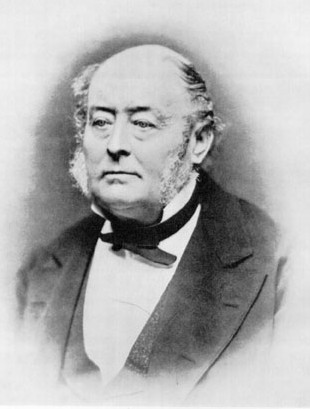
- J. J. Bachofen
- Born: 22 December 1815; Basel, Switzerland
- Died: 25 November 1887 (aged 71); Basel, Switzerland
- Spouse: Louise Bachofen-Burckhardt
- Scientific career
- Fields: Roman law, anthropology

Johann Jakob Bachofen (22 December 1815 – 25 November 1887) was a Swiss antiquarian, jurist, philologist, anthropologist, and professor of Roman law at the University of Basel from 1841 to 1844.

Bachofen is most often connected with his theories surrounding prehistoric matriarchy, or Das Mutterrecht, the title of his seminal 1861 book Mother Right: an investigation of the religious and juridical character of matriarchy in the Ancient World. Bachofen assembled documentation demonstrating that motherhood is the source of human society, religion, morality, and decorum. He postulated an archaic "mother-right" within the context of a primeval Matriarchal religion or Urreligion.

Bachofen became an important precursor of 20th-century theories of matriarchy, such as the Old European culture postulated by Marija Gimbutas from the 1950s, and the field of feminist theology and "matriarchal studies" in 1970s feminism.

== Biography ==
Born into a wealthy Basel family active in the silk industry, he attended services at the French Reformed Church in Basel. After attending the Gymnasium, Bachofen studied in Basel and in Berlin under August Boeckh, Karl Ferdinand Ranke, and Friedrich Carl von Savigny, as well as in Göttingen. After completing his doctorate in Basel, he studied for another two years in Paris, London, and Cambridge.

He was appointed to the Basel chair of Roman law in 1841. In 1842, he travelled to Rome with his father to, as he described it, see his spiritual homeland with his own eyes. After returning to Basel, he was appointed to the appellate court, and his subsequent book on Roman law received academic acclaim. He was also elected to the Grand Council of Basel.

He retired from his professorship in 1844 after the local press suggested that his family’s wealth had helped him obtain the university position. In 1845, he also resigned from the Grand Council. He served as a judge for twenty-five years, resigning after his marriage to Louise Bachofen-Burckhardt.

In 1848, he undertook a second journey to Rome, during which he witnessed the Roman revolution. This experience led him to shift his research focus from classical antiquity to early antiquity. Between 1851 and 1852, he travelled to Greece, Magna Graecia, and Etruria. He published most of his works as a private scholar.

== Personal life ==
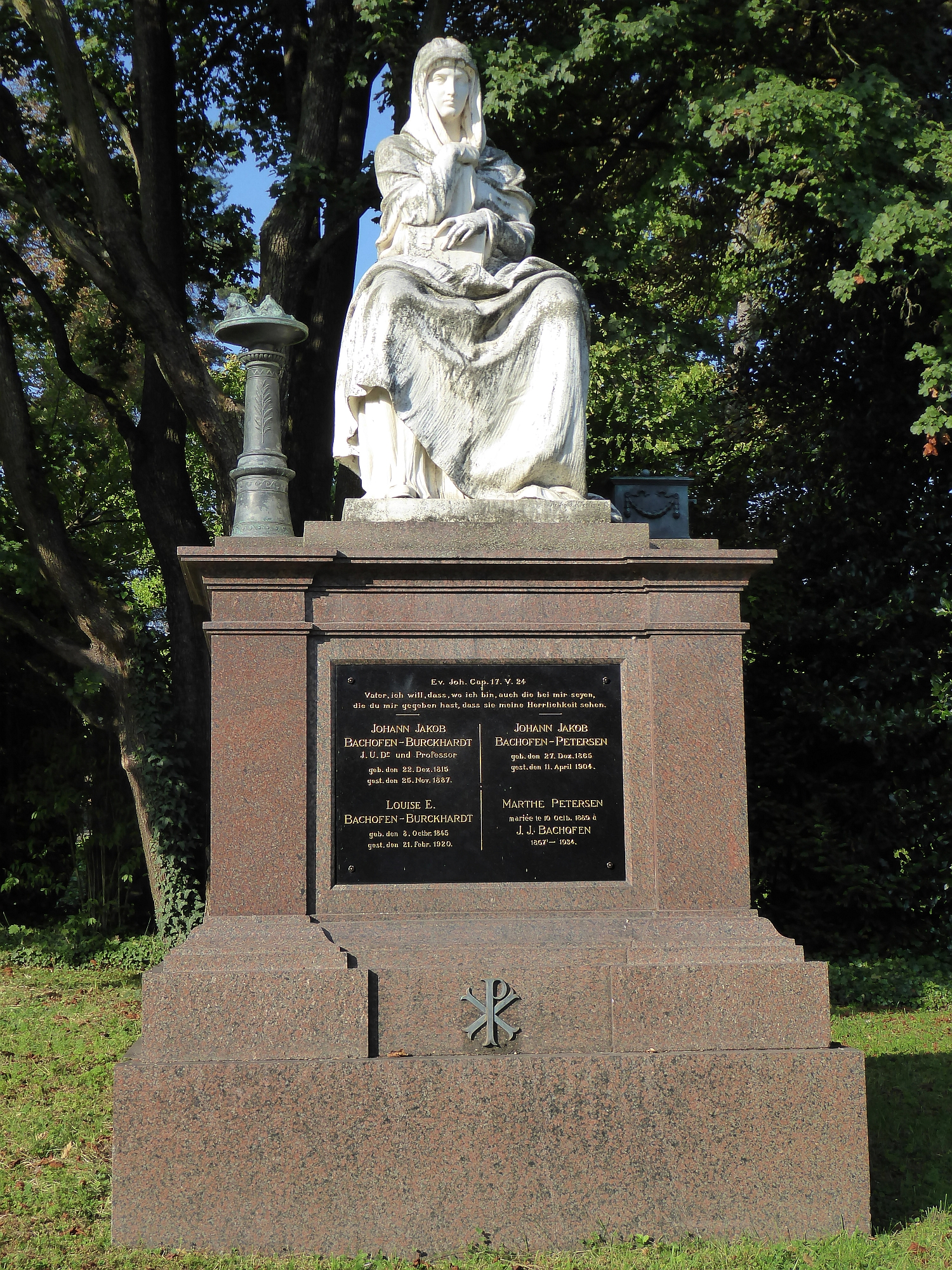
Tomb of the Bachofen family in the Wolfgottesacker. The statue was sculptured by Richard Kissling

His mother Valeria Merian Bachofen died in 1856 but he kept living in the same house as his father. It was the same house which would become the seat of the Civil Register of Basel between 1962 and 1983 and part of the Antikenmuseum Basel und Sammlung Ludwig in the 1980s. In 1865, he married the at the time twenty five-years old Louise Bachofen-Burckhardt from a noble family of Basel. He would buy a house at the square before the Minster of Basel and a son was born. Louise Bachofen Burckhardt would live in the house at the Minster Square after her husband would die in 1877. Johann Jakob Bachofen is buried at the Wolfgottesacker cemetery in Basel. The tomb was sculptured by Richard Kissling.

== Das Mutterrecht ==
Bachofen's 1861 Das Mutterrecht proposed four phases of cultural evolution which absorbed each other:

1. Hetaerism: a wild nomadic 'tellurian' [= chthonic or earth-centered] phase, characterised by him as communistic and polyamorous, whose dominant deity he believed to have been an earthy proto Aphrodite.
2. Das Mutterecht: a matriarchal 'lunar' phase based on agriculture, characterised by him by the emergence of chthonic mystery cults and law. Its dominant deity was an early Demeter.
3. The Dionysian: a transitional phase when earlier traditions were masculinised as patriarchy began to emerge. Its dominant deity was the original Dionysos.
4. The Apollonian: the patriarchal 'solar' phase, in which all trace of the Matriarchal and Dionysian past was eradicated and modern civilisation emerged.

=== Reception ===
There was little initial reaction to Bachofen's theory of cultural evolution, largely because of his impenetrable literary style, but eventually, along with furious criticism, the book inspired several generations of ethnologists, social philosophers, and even writers: Lewis Henry Morgan; Friedrich Engels, who drew on Bachofen for The Origin of the Family, Private Property and the State; Thomas Mann; Jane Ellen Harrison, who was inspired by Bachofen to devote her career to mythology; Walter Benjamin; Carl Jung; Erich Fromm; Robert Graves; Rainer Maria Rilke; Joseph Campbell; Otto Gross; Erich Neumann and opponents such as Julius Evola. In the 1930s his work was acclaimed by several prominent academics in the German speaking world.

Because of his theoretical commitment to Marxist historiography, Friedrich Engels faulted Bachofen for regarding "religion as the main lever of the world's history" and therefore considered it a "troublesome and not always profitable task to work your way through [his] big volume [i.e. Das Mutterrecht]". Nevertheless, he credited Bachofen with inaugurating research into the history of the family. He summarized Bachofen's views as follows:

"(1) That originally man lived in a state of sexual promiscuity, to describe which Bachofen uses the mistaken term "hetaerism";
(2) that such promiscuity excludes any certainty of paternity, and that descent could therefore be reckoned only in the female line, according to mother-right, and that this was originally the case amongst all the peoples of antiquity;
(3) that since women, as mothers, were the only parents of the younger generation that were known with certainty, they held a position of such high respect and honor that it became the foundation, in Bachofen's conception, of a regular rule of women (gynaecocracy);
(4) that the transition to monogamy, where the woman belonged to one man exclusively, involved a violation of a primitive religious law (that is, actually a violation of the traditional right of the other men to this woman), and that in order to expiate this violation or to purchase indulgence for it the woman had to surrender herself for a limited period." (Friedrich Engels, 1891: see link below)

Emile Durkheim credited Bachofen with upsetting the "old conception" that the father must be "the essential element of the family". Before Bachofen, Durkheim claims that "no one had dreamed that there could be a family organization of which the paternal authority was not the keystone".

In contrast to Engels and Durkheim, the American sociologist Carle Zimmerman criticized Bachofen's work for initiating a research paradigm in sociology that "completely divorced" the study of the family from history, replacing the "constant struggle between familism and individualism" with "imagination". He characterized Bachofen and the other members of this research paradigm, such as J.F. McLennan, L.H. Morgan, E.A. Westermark, and others, as "evolutionary cultists" and considered them to have "destroyed history as a fundamental study in social science" during the late nineteenth and early twentieth centuries.

== Works ==
- De legis actionibus de formulis et de condictione. Dissertation Basel. Dieterich, Göttingen 1840.
- Das Naturrecht und das geschichtliche Recht in ihren Gegensätzen. Basel 1841. reprint: Off. Librorum, Lauterbach 1995, ISBN 3-928406-19-1
- Römisches Pfandrecht. Schweighauser, Basel 1847. reprint: Keip, Goldbach 1997, ISBN 3-8051-0688-2
- Ausgewählte Lehren des römischen Civilrechts. Leipzig 1848. reprint: Keip, Goldbach 1997, ISBN 3-8051-0689-0
- Versuch über die Gräbersymbolik der Alten. Basel 1859
- Oknos der Seilflechter : ein Grabbild : Erlösungsgedanken antiker Gräbersymbolik. Basel 1859. reprint: Beck, München 1923
- Das Mutterrecht: eine Untersuchung über die Gynaikokratie der alten Welt nach ihrer religiösen und rechtlichen Natur. Stuttgart: Verlag von Krais und Hoffmann, 1861 ( Internet Archive link)
  - abbreviated edition, ed. Hans-Jürgen Heinrichs. (Suhrkamp Taschenbücher Wissenschaft; Nr.135.) Frankfurt am Main: Suhrkamp, 1975 ISBN 3-518-27735-9
  - excerpts edited as Mutterrecht und Urreligion: eine Auswahl, ed. Rudolf Marx. (Kröners Taschenausgabe; Band 52) Leipzig: A. Kröner, 1927; Stuttgart, 1954; 6th ed. 1984 ISBN 978-3-520-05206-3.
- Antiquarische Briefe vornemlich zur Kenntniss der ältesten Verwandtschaftsbegriffe. 2 vols. Trübner, Strassburg 1880 & 1886.
- Römische Grablampen nebst einigen andern Grabdenkmälern vorzugsweise eigener Sammlung. Basel 1890
- Gesammelte Werke (collected works) ed. Karl Meuli. Basel: B. Schwabe, 1943–1967, in 8 volumes (I-IV, VI-VIII and X)
  - I. Antrittsrede; politische Betrachtungen
  - II. Das Mutterecht, erste Hälfte
  - III. Das Mutterecht, zweite Hälfte
  - IV. Die Sage von Tanaquil
  - VII. Die Unsterblichkeitslehre der orphanischen Theologie: Römische Grablampen
  - VIII. Antiquarische Briefe
  - X. Briefe
- Myth, Religion and Mother Right Princeton University Press, translated by Ralph Manheim, 1967 ISBN 978-0-691-01797-6
- An English Translation of Bachofen's Mutterrecht (Mother Right) (1861): A Study of the Religious and Juridical Aspects of Gynecocracy in the Ancient World Volumes 1-5:
  - Vol 1. "Lycia," "Crete," and "Athens" Lewiston, NY: Edwin Mellen, translated by David Partenheimer, 30 January 2008 ISBN 9780773451865
  - Vol 2. "Lemnos" and "Egypt" Lewiston, NY: Edwin Mellen, translated by David Partenheimer, 1 April 2007 ISBN 9780773454798
  - Vol 3. Orchomenus And the Minyan's And India And Central Asia Lewiston, NY: Edwin Mellen, translated by David Partenheimer, 30 June 2006 ISBN 9780975995389
  - Vol 4. "Elis", "The Epizephyrian Locrians", and "Lesbos" Lewiston, NY: Edwin Mellen, translated by David Partenheimer, 1 June 2005, ISBN 9780773462984 ISBN 978-0779919031
  - Vol 5. Mantinea; Pythagoreanism and Subsequent Doctrines; The Cantabri; Lewiston, NY: Edwin Mellen, translated by David Partenheimer, 1 January 2003 ISBN 978-0779919048

== See also ==
- List of important publications in anthropology
- James Frazer
- René Girard
- Robert Graves
- Matriarchal religion
- Margaret Murray
- Potnia theron
