= Stahlberg (disambiguation) =

Stahlberg may refer to:

- Stahlberg, a municipality in Germany
- Stahlberg Models, a promotional model car company from Finland
- Georg Stahlberg (1866–1942), Estonian opera singer and music pedagogue
- Henning Stahlberg (born 1965), German physicist and professor
- Jan Henrik Stahlberg (born 1970), German actor and film director
- Nico Stahlberg (born 1991), Swiss rower
