= Affolter =

Affolter is a surname

- Félicie Affolter (1926–2024), Swiss psychologist, psychotherapist, speech therapist and teacher of the deaf.
- François Affolter (born 1991), Swiss footballer
- Konrad Affolter (born 1954), Swiss handball player
- Markus Affolter (born 1958), Swiss biologist
- Sydney Affolter (born 2003), American former basketball player
- Heath, Jon, Nathan and Thomas Affolter, brothers who run the Canadian film studio Foreshadow Films.
