= Hauri =

Hauri is a Swiss surname. Notable people with this surname include:

- Erik Hauri (1966–2018), American geochemist
- Hans-Peter Hauri (born 1945), Swiss biologist
- Katharina Hauri, Swiss Salvation Army soldier and musician
- Matthew Hauri (born 1996), American rapper known as "Yung Gravy"
- Max Hauri (1941–2015), Swiss equestrian
- Rebekka Hauri (born 1998), Swiss volleyball player and model
