= Andreas Engel =

Swiss structural biologist (1943–2026)

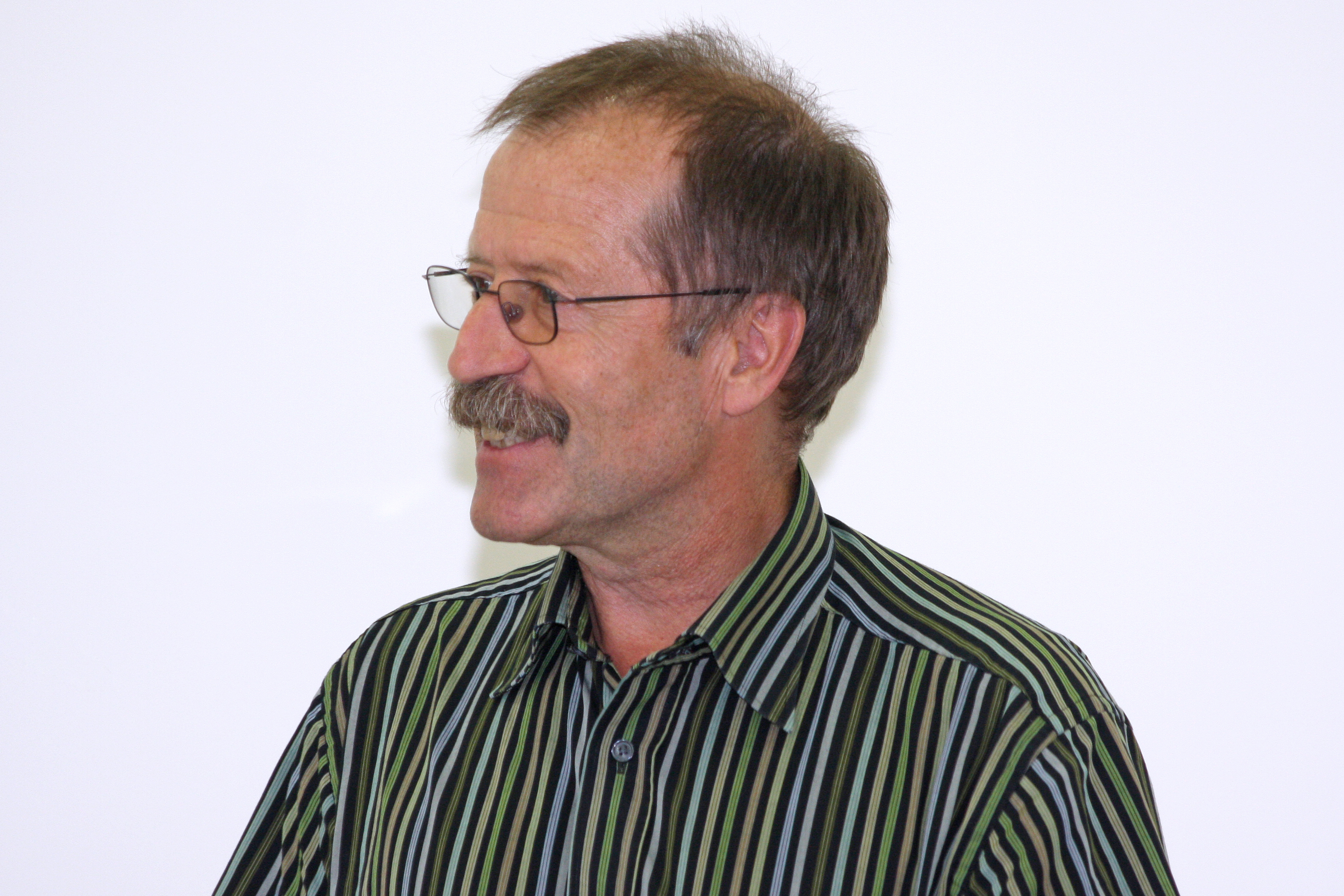
- Engel in 2009
- Born: 6 October 1943; Bern, Switzerland
- Died: 1 April 2026 (aged 82); Basel, Switzerland
- Scientific career
- Fields: Structural biology
- Workplaces: Johns Hopkins University, Biozentrum University of Basel

Andreas Engel (6 October 1943 – 1 April 2026) was a Swiss structural biologist and co-founder of the Maurice E. Müller Institute for Structural Biology at the Biozentrum of the University of Basel.

== Background ==
Engel studied physics and mathematics in Bern (PhD 1972) and at the Johns Hopkins University, Baltimore. In 1974 he joined the Biozentrum Basel. In 1986, after work in industry, he became Professor for Structural Biology. Engel and Ueli Aebi established the Maurice E. Müller Institute for Structural Biology. After becoming professor emeritus in 2010, Engel joined the Case Western Reserve University, to build up the Cleveland Center for Membrane and Structural Biology. He worked at the Department of Bionanoscience, part of the Kavli Institute of Nanoscience and TU Delft until his retirement in 2018.

Engel died in Basel on 1 April 2026, at the age of 82.

== Work ==
Engel pioneered the application of scanning transmission electron microscopy (STEM) and atomic force microscopy (AFM) to image biomolecular complexes. Mass measurements using STEM, 2-dimensional crystallization of membrane proteins, cryo-electron crystallography and AFM were applied to study the structure of supramolecular assemblies [5]. Gram negative and positive pathogens, as well as bacterial envelopes were analyzed. Fujiyoshi and Engel solved the structure of Aquaporin-1 in collaboration with Agre. Together with Palczewski Engel's team discovered the packing arrangement of rhodopsin in the retina. Engel developed the first curriculum in nanoscale sciences that attracted many young talents to the University of Basel. Similar programs have since been implemented in many top universities.

== Awards and honors ==
- 1996 Elected Member of the European Molecular Biology Organization
- 1999 Max Gruber Lecture, Groningen
- 2006 Karl Friederich Bonhoeffer Lecture, Göttingen
- 2006 Edmund de Rothschild Lecture, Paris
- 2012 Doctor Medicine Honoris Causa, Aarhus University
