= Biozentrum University of Basel =

Division of the University of Basel

Coordinates: 47°33′51″N 7°34′51″E

Biozentrum, University of Basel
- Motto: The Center for Molecular Life Sciences
- Established: 1971
- Academic affiliation: University of Basel
- Director: Alexander F. Schier
- Location: Basel, Switzerland
- Website: www.biozentrum.unibas.ch
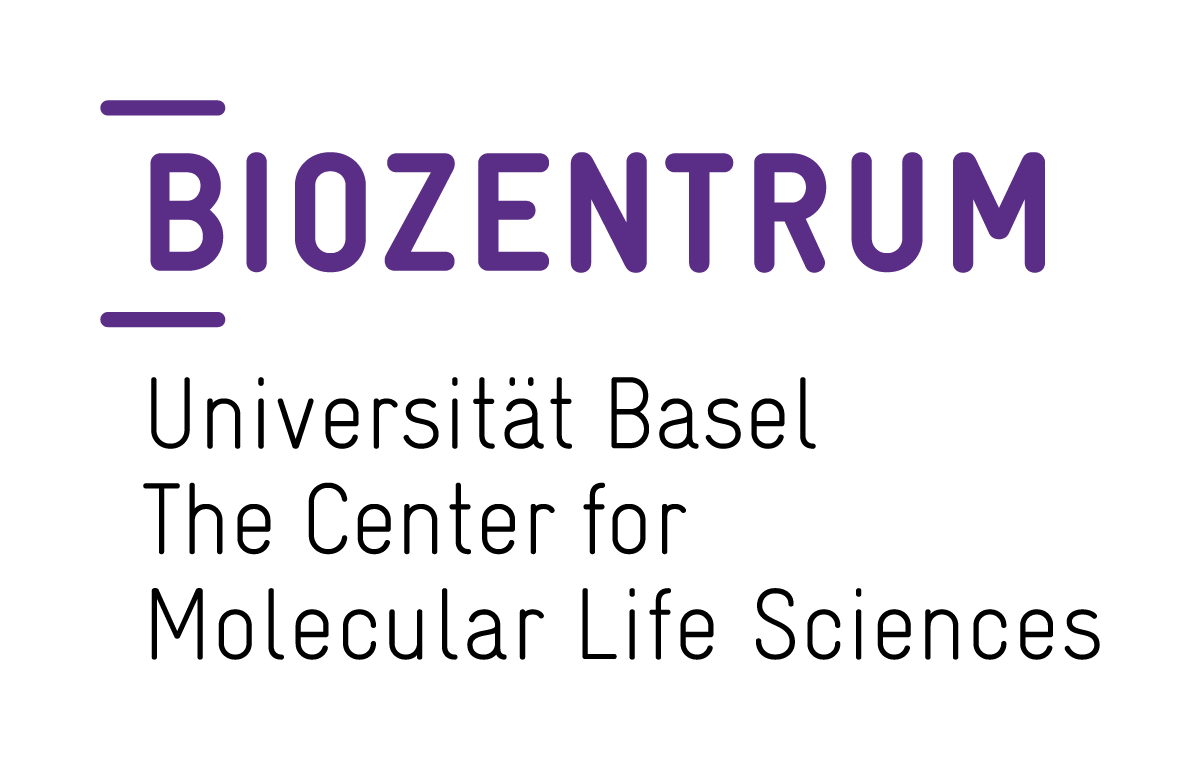

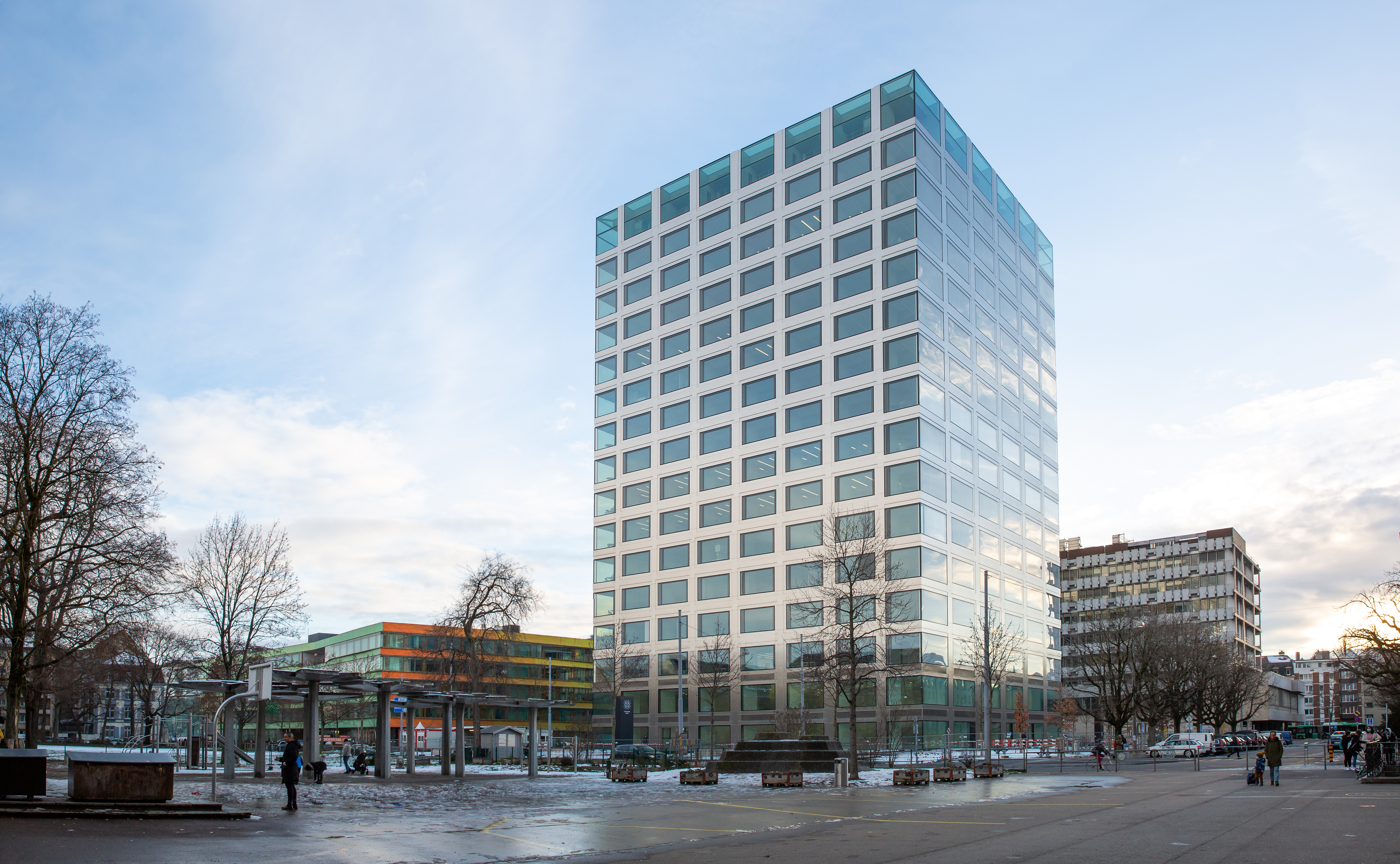
Biozentrum, University of Basel

Research at the Biozentrum of the University of Basel is dedicated to the central question of how molecules and cells create life − from atom to organism, and from the physics of life to the dynamics of multicellular systems. Accordingly, the scientists at the Biozentrum are active in a wide range of research fields. These disciplines are not strictly separated from each other, but often overlap, thus leading to new questions and collaborations.

With 529 employees, the Biozentrum is the largest department at the University of Basel's Faculty of Science. It is home to 32 research groups with scientists from more than 40 nations who investigate how molecules and cells create life.

== History ==
In 1971, at the time when the Biozentrum was founded, the concept of developing an interdisciplinary biological research facility was unique in Europe. Scientists from academy and industry as well as representatives of the Canton of Basel-Stadt promoted the Biozentrum's development.

In the winter semester 1972/73 the first students enrolled for the new "Biology II" curriculum. It encompassed a two-year foundation course in mathematics, physics and chemistry as well as a cycle of block courses – a new teaching format. In 1976 the first students received their diplomas. In 1978 the Biozentrum became a department of the University of Basel. In the same year, one of the founding professors, Werner Arber, was awarded the Nobel Prize for Physiology or Medicine for his discovery of the restriction enzymes.

With the incorporation of the Maurice E. Müller Institute in 1986, the Biozentrum became a competence center for high resolution electron microscopy. It also established a platform for nuclear magnetic resonance spectroscopy. Cooperation with the Institute for Immunology (Hofmann-La Roche) and the Friedrich Miescher Institute (Ciba/Geigy) became ever closer and networking more and more important: In 1996, what is now the "Center of Competence and Excellence in Neuroscience" was founded. Then "Neurex", the largest tri-national alliance of neurobiologists, was set up. The "Basel Signalling Alliance", the "Neuroscience Network Basel", and the "Basel Stem Cell Network" followed. And finally, the Basel Translational Medicine Hub was established to further personalized medicine. The major areas of investigation were also extended: whereas into the 1990s the Biozentrum focused on Cell Growth & Development, Neurobiology and Structural Biology, it was at the beginning of the 21st century that Infection Biology and Computational & Systems Biology were added. Building up a range of Technology Core Facilities which offer highly sophisticated methods of investigation and analysis was also a priority during the last decade.

In 2021, the Biozentrum moved into a 73 m high research tower. The new building offers a state-of the art infrastructure that meets the needs of modern-day research as well as enough room for 400 researchers and 900 students. The Biozentrum is headed by its director Alexander F. Schier.

== Research ==
Research at the Biozentrum is dedicated to the central question of how molecules and cells create life − from atom to organism, and from the physics of life to the dynamics of multicellular systems. Accordingly, the scientists at the Biozentrum are active in a wide range of research fields. These disciplines are not strictly separated from each other, but often overlap, thus leading to new questions and collaborations.

Modern research increasingly depends on sophisticated technologies, notably in the fields of genomics, proteomics, imaging, and data analysis. To meet this challenge, the Biozentrum has established a number of so-called Technology Platforms. It has facilities for electron and light microscopy, cell imaging and nanoanalytics, proteomics, biophysics, FACS (Fluorescence Activated Cell Sorting) and Research IT. A microarray and a quantitative genomics facility are being shared with other regional research institute

== Degrees awarded ==
The courses of studies in molecular biology at the Biozentrum are characterized by the early exposure of the students to current research, the offer of all research areas and methods relevant to molecular biology, a modern technical infrastructure and the practical-work-oriented supervision.

=== BSc Major in Molecular Biology ===
The bachelor's degree program in Molecular Biology encompasses one year of basic studies followed by two years of immersion in more specialized topics. In the first year, knowledge in mathematics, physics, general chemistry and the basic principles of biology are acquired. In the second year, students attend lectures in biochemistry, developmental biology, genetics, human physiology, immunology, molecular microbiology, neurobiology, structural biology and physics of life and they participate in a practical course in experimental molecular biology. The third year of study has also a practical orientation: in three six-week block courses the students actively engage in research and they work on and write an eight-week theses in Molecular Biology.

=== BSc Major in Computational Biology ===
The bachelor's degree program in Computational Sciences leading to a Major in Computational Biology also starts with one year of basic studies in mathematics, physics and chemistry and courses in computer science. In the second year, mathematics and computer science are combined with the basic principles of molecular biology. Besides the lectures, the students participate in a practical course in experimental molecular biology. One six-week block course with theoretical and experimental content as well as two research projects are part of the program of the third academic year.

=== MSc in Molecular Biology ===
The prerequisite for admission to the master's degree in Molecular Biology is a "Bachelor of Science in Biology" with a "Major in Molecular Biology", in some cases a "Major in Integrative Biology", or a "Bachelor of Science in Computational Sciences" with a "Major in Computational Biology". In general, the program takes three semesters to complete. Students concentrate principally on an own research project. They work at least ten months in the laboratory.

=== MSc in Physics of Life ===
The admission to the master’s degree in Physics of Life requires a Bachelor of Science in mathematics, computer science, physics, chemistry, biochemistry, or engineering. In general, the program takes three semesters to complete. The major focus lies on two three-month research projects as well as on the master’s thesis.

=== PhD program ===
The PhD program builds on a university degree in biology or related discipline and requires the student to engage in an independent research project within a period of three to four years. The program is completed by writing a thesis. The students also receive practical training in the latest methods and techniques of molecular biology research and attend courses of the Graduate Teaching Program.

=== Postdoctoral ===
To expand their knowledge and experience, young researchers often spend a few years in research groups abroad. Accordingly, postdoctoral researchers from all continents are working at the Biozentrum.

== Biozentrum in figures ==
Members of staff in 2025

Total members of staff: 522
Professors: 34
Postdoctoral researchers: 109
PhD students: 129
Scientific staff, etc.: 44
Master Students: 37
Lab staff/Technicians: 129
Administration: 40

Annual financial statement 2025

Total expenditure: : 75.9 Mio. CHF
University of Basel: 68.2 %
National Science Foundation: 19.7%
Swiss Institute of Bioinformatics: 2%
Misc. third party grants: 10.1%

== Notable people ==
The following notable people work or have worked at the Biozentrum:

- Jan Pieter Abrahams
- Ueli Aebi
- Markus Affolter
- Silvia Arber
- Werner Arber
- Marek Basler
- Attila Becskei
- Thomas A. Bickle
- Dirk Bumann
- Guy R. Cornelis
- Christoph Dehio
- Médéric Diard
- Fiona Doetsch
- Flavio Donato
- Knut Drescher
- Andreas Engel
- Ben Engel
- Jürgen Engel
- Walter Gehring
- Stephan Grzesiek
- Michael N. Hall
- Christoph Handschin
- Hans-Peter Hauri
- Sebastian Hiller
- Maria Hondele
- Urs Jenal
- Claudia Keller Valsecchi
- Anissa Kempf
- Yuping Li
- Roderick Lim
- Timm Maier
- Susan Mango
- Richard Neher
- Urs A. Meyer
- John Graham Nicholls
- Erich Nigg
- Jean Pieters
- Heinrich Reichert
- Markus Rüegg
- Gottfried Schatz
- Peter Scheiffele
- Alexander F. Schier
- Tilman Schirmer
- Torsten Schwede
- Anna Seelig-Löffler
- Joachim Seelig
- Anne Spang
- Martin Spiess
- Henning Stahlberg
- Erik van Nimwegen
- Mihaela Zavolan

=== Former chairs ===
Since 1973 the Biozentrum has been led by a chair. In 2009, the position was changed to director. The following persons have occupied this position:

- Max M. Burger (1973–77)
- Jürgen Engel (1977–79)
- Werner Arber (1979–83)
- Gottfried Schatz (1983–85)
- Kasper Kirschner (1985–87)
- Walter J. Gehring (1987–89)
- Johan N. Jansonius (1989–91)
- Thomas A. Bickle (1991–93)
- Urs A. Meyer (1993–95)
- Walter Keller (1995–97)
- Joachim Seelig (1997–99 and 2000–09)
- Andreas Engel (1999–2000)
- Erich Nigg (2009–2018)
- Alexander F. Schier (2018–present)
