= Handschin =

Handschin is a surname. Notable people with the surname include:

- Christoph Handschin, Swiss cell biologist
- Emil Handschin (1928–1990), Swiss ice hockey player
- Johannes Handschin (1899–1948), Swiss artist
- Roman Handschin (born 1982), Swiss bobsledder
- Thomas Handschin (born 1973), Swiss bobsledder
