= Anna Seelig-Löffler =

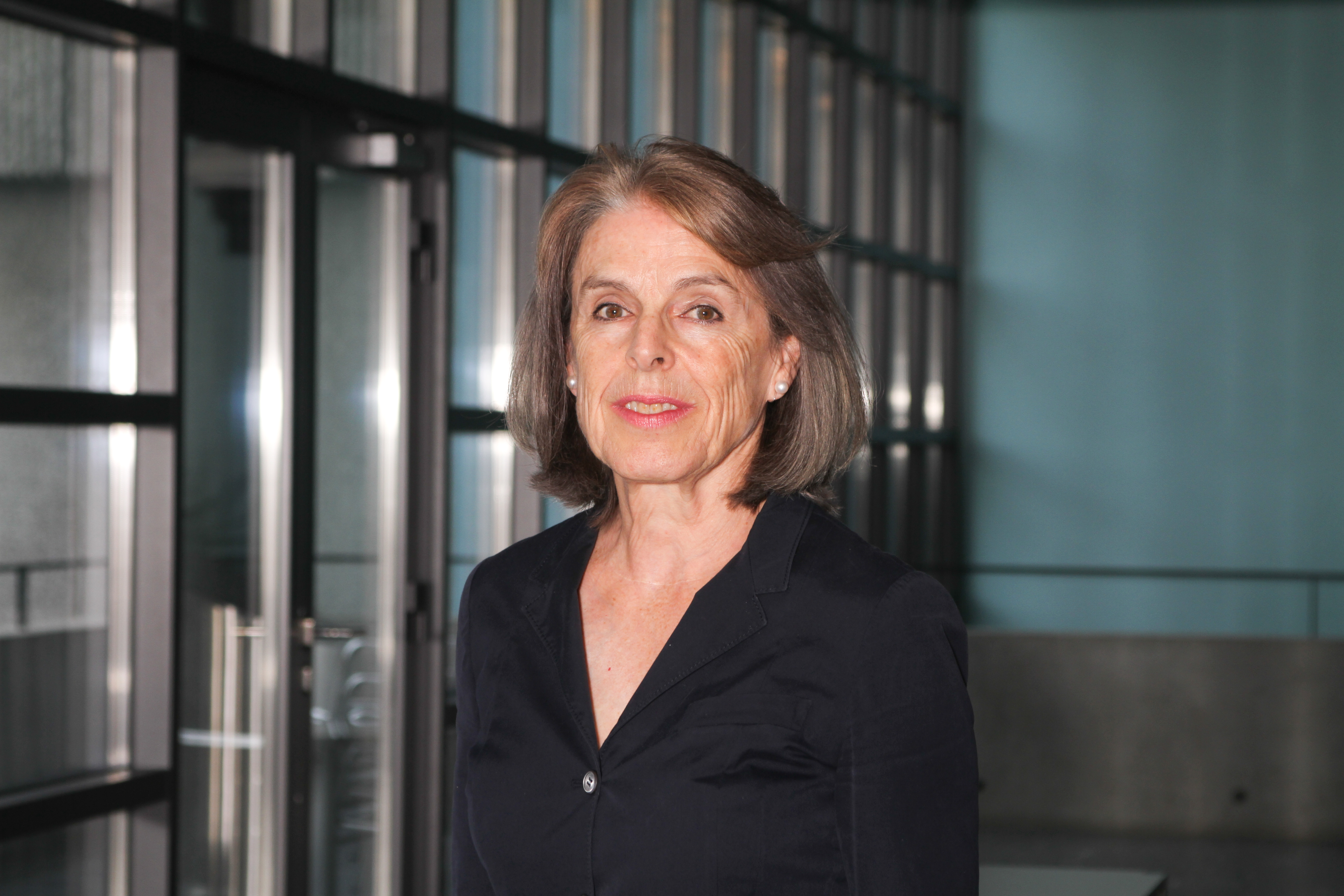
- Anna Seelig-Löffler (2011)
- Born: October 7, 1944 (age 81)
- Citizenship: Basel
- Scientific career
- Fields: Biophysical chemist
- Workplaces: Biozentrum University of Basel

Anna Seelig-Löffler (born October 7, 1944 from Basel) is a Swiss biophysical chemist who worked at the Biozentrum University of Basel, Switzerland.

== Life ==
Anna Seelig-Löffler studied medicine and chemistry and received her PhD in physical chemistry from the University of Basel. As a postdoc she worked with Prof. Joachim Seelig. She then became an independent scientist in the Division of Biophysical Chemistry at the Biozentrum, habilitated in 1992, and later became honorary Professor of Biophysical Chemistry at the University of Basel. She reached emeritus status in 2012.

== Work ==
Her areas of expertise include the structural and functional analysis of membranes and their lipid and protein components. More recently her work focused on ATP Binding Cassette (ABC) transporters, such as P-glycoprotein, which prevent drug uptake across cell membranes and cause multidrug resistance. She discovered a universal substrate pattern for P-glycoprotein which made it possible to estimate the chance of a substrate to reach its target site. Based on these findings she developed a model to predict drug uptake across biological membranes.

== Awards and honors ==
2008 STK Award of the Swiss Society for Thermal Analysis and Calorimetry
