= Daniel Jobst Müller =

German biophysicist (born 1965)

Daniel J. Müller
- Born: 22 March 1965 (age 61); Bad Wimpfen, Germany
- Citizenship: German
- Education: Technische Universität Berlin, Hahn-Meitner-Institute (BSc); University of Basel, Forschungszentrum Jülich (PhD)
- Known for: Membrane protein biophysics, Cell biophysics, Atomic force microscopy, Bionanotechnology
- Scientific career
- Fields: Biophysics
- Workplaces: Max Planck Institute of Molecular Cell Biology and Genetics; Dresden University of Technology; ETH Zürich
- Doctoral advisor: Andreas Engel, Georg Büldt
- Website: www.bsse.ethz.ch/biophysics

Daniel Jobst Müller (born 22 March 1965) is a German scientist and Professor of Biophysics at ETH Zürich. He is known for work on single molecule and cell biophysics, bionanotechnology, and membrane proteins.

== Education ==
Müller was educated in physics at the University of Technology Berlin and the Hahn-Meitner-Institute in Berlin, Germany. He did his PhD research at University of Basel with Andreas Engel and Forschungszentrum Jülich with Goerg Büldt. He was awarded his PhD in 1997 in Life Sciences at the University of Basel.

== Research career ==
In 2000, Müller became a group leader at the Max Planck Institute for Cell Biology and Genetics in Dresden, Germany. Shortly after, he was appointed full Professor at Technical University of Dresden in 2002, where he acted as director from 2003 to 2005. His research group initially focused on single molecule biophysics before branching out into wider topics such as cell biophysics, cell adhesion, and cell mechanics.

In 2010 Müller was appointed as a Professor at ETH Zurich in the Department of Biosystems Science and Engineering, Basel, Switzerland. In 2014 Muller co-launched the Swiss National Competence Centre of Research (NCCR) on Molecular Systems Engineering seeking to establish new engineering principles to assemble functional molecular modules into complex systems that can fulfill tasks not observed in nature. In the last 20 years he has co-authored more than 200 research articles in international scientific journals and been cited more than 17,000 times.

In 2006 Müller founded nAmbition, a bionanotechnology company focused on automated robotic technology for high-throughput single molecule force spectroscopy of proteins. The company was acquired by JPK instruments in 2008.
