= Thomas A. Bickle =

British/Swiss microbiologist

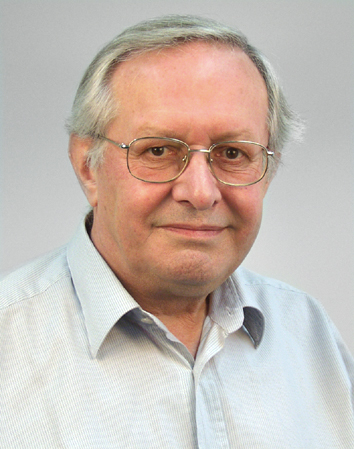
- Thomas A. Bickle 2002
- Scientific career
- Fields: Microbiology
- Workplaces: University of Geneva, University of California, Davis, Biozentrum University of Basel

Thomas Anthony Bickle is a British/Swiss microbiologist.

== Life ==
Thomas A. Bickle studied biology at the University of Geneva. He completed his doctorate in 1972 at the University of California, Davis and subsequently worked there as an assistant. The following year he moved to the Biozentrum at the University of Basel on an EMBO Long-Term Fellowship. Here he was appointed in 1980 to associate professor and in 1990 to full professor. In addition to his duties in research and teaching, he served as Chairman of the Biozentrum and as Dean of the Faculty of Science. He reached emeritus status in 2005.

== Work ==
Thomas A. Bickle mainly investigated the mode of action of bacterial DNA restriction and modification systems. These systems protect bacteria from being invaded by foreign DNA, either free or packaged in bacterial viruses. So-called restriction enzymes (endonucleases) recognize foreign DNA and inactivate these through endonucleolytic cleavage. In Escherichia coli Bickle elucidated the precise method used by these enzymes to distinguish between their own and foreign DNA, He identified the DNA recognition sequences of various restriction enzymes and investigated their structure. Furthermore, he demonstrated that many bacterial viruses have evolved diverse defense mechanisms to avoid restriction.

== Awards and honors ==
- 1980 elected Member of the European Molecular Biology Organization (EMBO)
- 1985 member of the Swiss Commission for Molecular Biology
