= Susan Mango =

American biologist

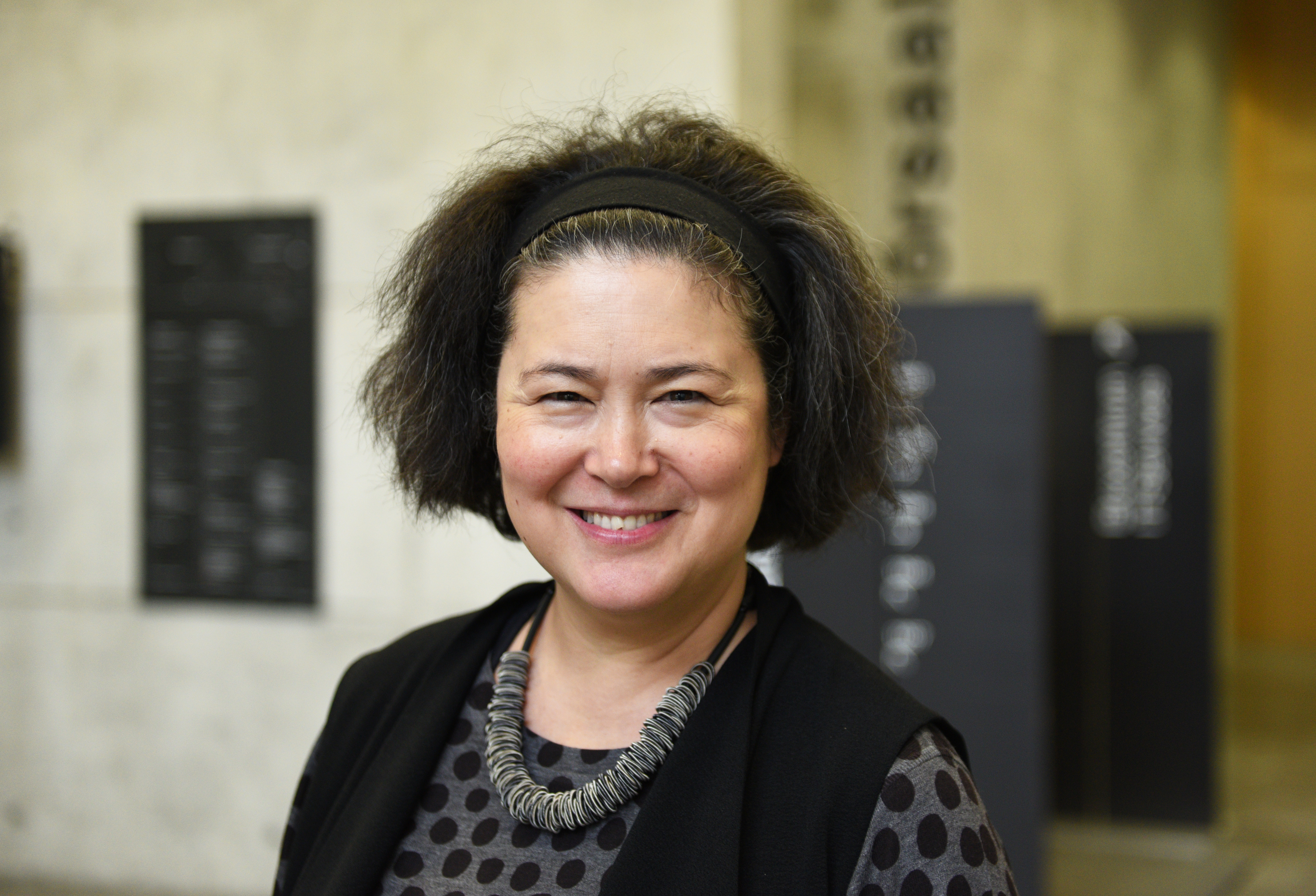
- Susan Mango in 2017
- Education: Harvard University; Princeton University (PhD)
- Awards: MacArthur Fellows Program (2008); Elected member of the European Molecular Biology Organization (2019)
- Scientific career
- Fields: Biology

Susan E. Mango is an American biologist, the former H.A. and Edna Benning Professor of Oncological Sciences at the University of Utah, and former professor at Harvard University. She is Professor of Cell and Developmental Biology and research group leader at Biozentrum University of Basel

Mango graduated from Harvard University, and from Princeton University with a Ph.D. She was a postdoctoral research fellow in the lab of Judith Kimble at the University of Wisconsin-Madison.

She and her team are currently studying the cells of the worm C. elegans to observe how a cell transforms from a pluripotent state into a particular cell type. Her articles have been published in Nature, Science, Cell, and PLoS Biology.

== Awards ==
- 2008 MacArthur Fellows Program
- 2019 Elected member of the European Molecular Biology Organization (EMBO)
