= Sebastian Hiller =

German-Swiss structural biologist

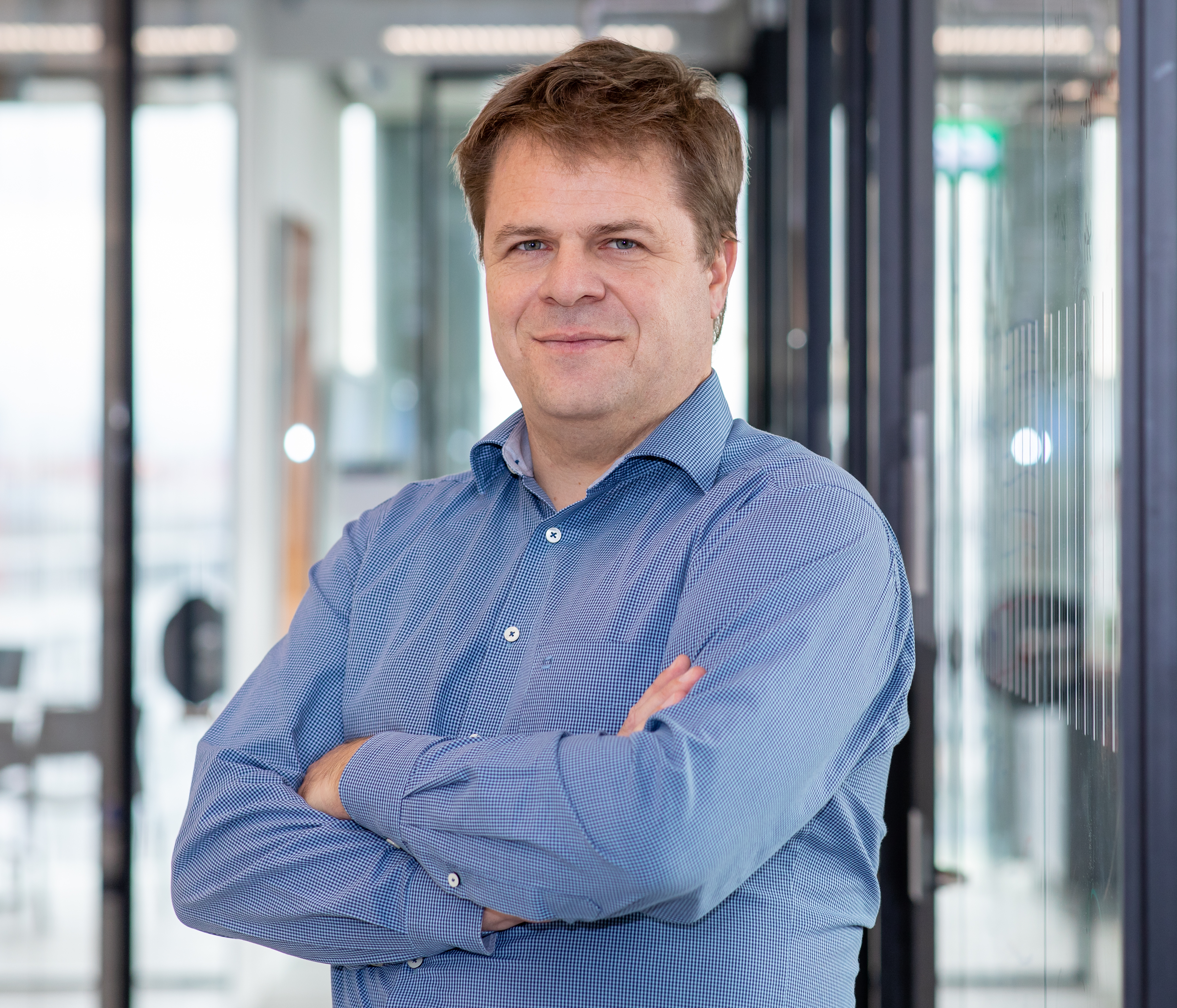
- Sebastian Hiller (2024)
- Scientific career
- Fields: Structural biology
- Workplaces: ETH Zürich, University of Cambridge, Harvard Medical School, Biozentrum University of Basel

Sebastian Hiller is a German and Swiss structural biologist and biophysicist. He has been teaching and researching at the Biozentrum of the University of Basel since 2010.

== Life ==
Sebastian Hiller studied Interdisciplinary Natural Sciences at ETH Zurich and the University of Cambridge. He obtained his doctorate in 2006 in the laboratory of the Swiss Nobel Prize winner Kurt Wüthrich on methods of Nuclear Magnetic Resonance (NMR) spectroscopy. He conducted postdoctoral research with Gerhard Wagner at Harvard Medical School in Boston and with Beat Meier at ETH Zurich. In 2010, Sebastian Hiller was awarded an SNSF professorship at the Biozentrum of the University of Basel. In 2015 he was appointed Associate Professor and in 2022 Full Professor at the University of Basel.

== Work ==
Sebastian Hiller uses NMR spectroscopy to investigate the structure and function of proteins, their interactions and underlying molecular mechanisms. By investigating the biophysical principles of molecular chaperone function, he was recently able to show how the state of α-synuclein in living cells is regulated, which plays a key role in the development of Parkinson's disease. He is also exploring the outer membrane protein biogenesis of Gram-negative bacteria and the way it can be targeted by novel antibiotics. By elucidating the natural compound darobactin's mode of action, his research serves as a basis for the rational design of new antibiotics, to help fight the world-wide antimicrobial resistance crisis. Other areas of research focus on mechanisms of bacterial cell signaling and mechanisms that control pyroptosis and chronic inflammation. Recent findings showed that the protein NINJ1 plays an important role in inflammatory reactions in the body and forms a molecular built-in breaking point on the cell membrane in preparation for cell death.

== Awards and honors ==
- 2026 Elected member of the European Molecular Biology Organization
- 2026 Elected member of the German National Academy of Sciences Leopoldina
- 2018 ICMRBS Founder's medal
- 2014 EMBO Young investigator
- 2011 ERC Starting grant
- 2010 SNSF Professorship
- 2008 SNSF Scholarship for young researchers
