= Dirk Bumann =

German infection biologist

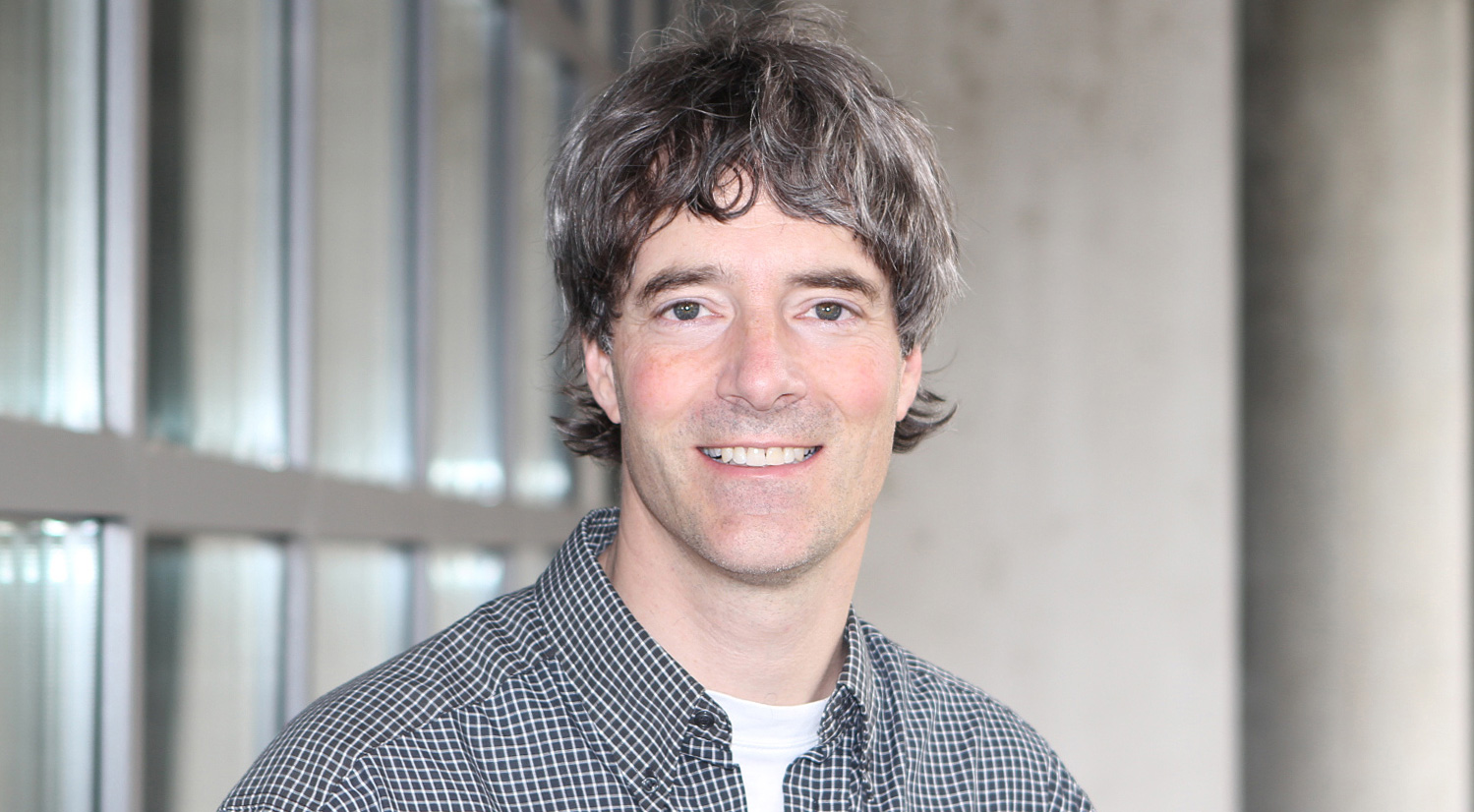
- Dirk Bumann (2015)
- Born: Berlin
- Scientific career
- Fields: Infection biology
- Workplaces: Free University of Berlin, Max Planck Institute of Biochemistry, Marine Biological Laboratory, Max Planck Institute for Infection Biology, Hannover Medical School, Biozentrum University of Basel

Dirk Bumann is a German infection biologist and professor at the Biozentrum of the University of Basel, Switzerland.

== Life ==
Dirk Bumann studied chemistry and biology at the Free University of Berlin. In 1994 he earned his doctorate at the Max Planck Institute for Biochemistry in Martinsried followed by postdoc research at the Marine Biological Laboratory, Woods Hole, US. From 1997 to 2004 Bumann was a research group leader at the Max Planck Institute for Infection Biology in Berlin and from 2004 till 2007 he taught and researched at the Hannover Medical School (MHH). Since 2007 Dirk Bumann is a Professor of Infection Biology at the Biozentrum of the University of Basel.

== Work ==
Bumann‘s research focuses on the study of pathogenic metabolic processes in the bacteria Salmonella and Shigella that cause typhus and diarrheal diseases. He investigates how these pathogens obtain nutrients from their host and how they coordinate the individual activities in metabolic networks and cause diseases through their growth. In addition, Dirk Bumann demonstrated that Salmonella within intestinal cells are initially marked through the attachment of Ubiquitin and finally the phosphorylating protein optineurin binds to them. This tags them for special cell organelles, the autophagosomes, which recognize and eliminate them.

== Awards and honors ==
- 2007 "Go-Bio" Award
- 2006 EMBO Young Investigator Award
- 2006 BD Research Prize
- 2015 Pettenkofer Prize
- 2015 Elected member of the European Molecular Biology Organization (EMBO)
- 2024 Elected member of Leopoldina
