= Mihaela Zavolan =

System biologist and professor

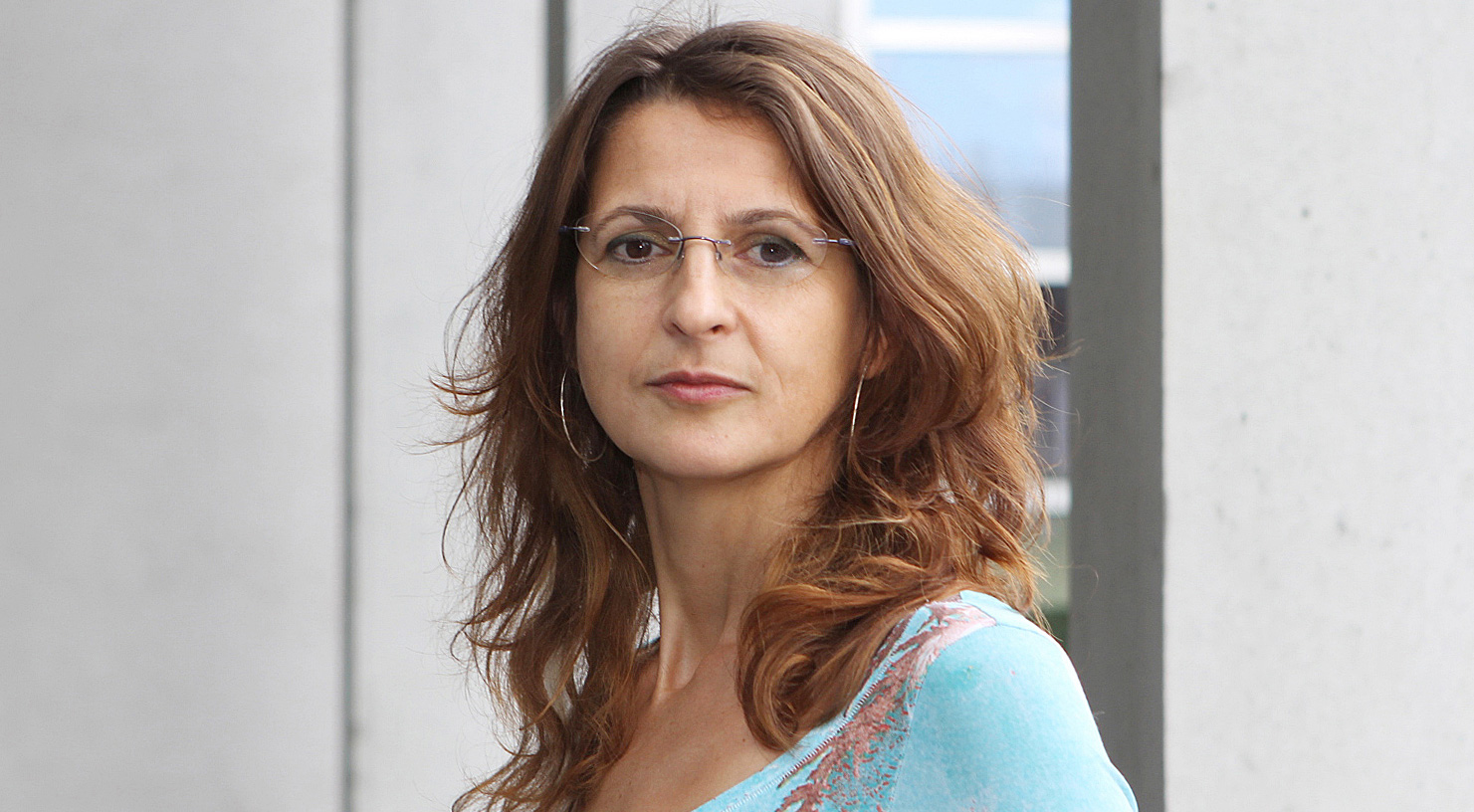
- Mihaela Zavolan (2015)
- Scientific career
- Fields: Systems Biology
- Workplaces: Victor Babeș University of Medicine and Pharmacy, Timișoara, University of New Mexico, Santa Fe Institute, Los Alamos National Laboratory, Rockefeller University, Swiss Institute of Bioinformatics, Biozentrum University of Basel

Mihaela Zavolan is a system biologist and Professor at the Biozentrum of the University of Basel.

== Life ==
Mihaela Zavolan studied medicine at the University of Medicine and Pharmacy in Timișoara, Romania. She then graduated with a PhD in Computer Science from the University of New Mexico in Albuquerque, USA. Between 1993 and 2003 Mihaela Zavolan carried out research in the US, at the Santa Fe Institute in Santa Fe, the Los Alamos National Laboratory in Los Alamos, as well as at the Rockefeller University in New York. In 2003, Mihaela Zavolan was appointed Professor of Computational and Systems Biology at the Biozentrum of the University of Basel. She is also a group leader of the Swiss Institute of Bioinformatics (SIB).

== Work ==
The main focus of the research in Mihaela Zavolan's group is of microRNAs (miRNAs). These 22 nucleotides long RNA molecules regulate the expression of protein coding genes, thereby controlling cell differentiation, metabolism and immune responses. Through the development of high-throughput experimental methods and computational analyses, Zavolan has contributed to the discovery of many miRNAs in various organisms ranging from viruses to humans. She has developed algorithms to predict miRNA genes and miRNA targets, and has worked on the development of the CLIP method (cross-linking and immunoprecipitation) for mapping the binding sites of RNA-binding proteins in RNAs. Recently, her group used CLIP binding site data to infer a biophysical model of miRNA-target interaction, which can be used to predict the strength between of interactions between miRNAs and their targets on mRNAs and long non-coding RNA.

== Awards and honors ==
- 2012 ERC Starting Grant
- 2014 elected Member of the Academia Europaea

== Video link ==
- Video: Prof. Dr. Mihaela Zavolan – Computational Biology cccs.unibas.ch. Retrieved 2020-12-21
