= Markus Rüegg =

Swiss neurobiologist

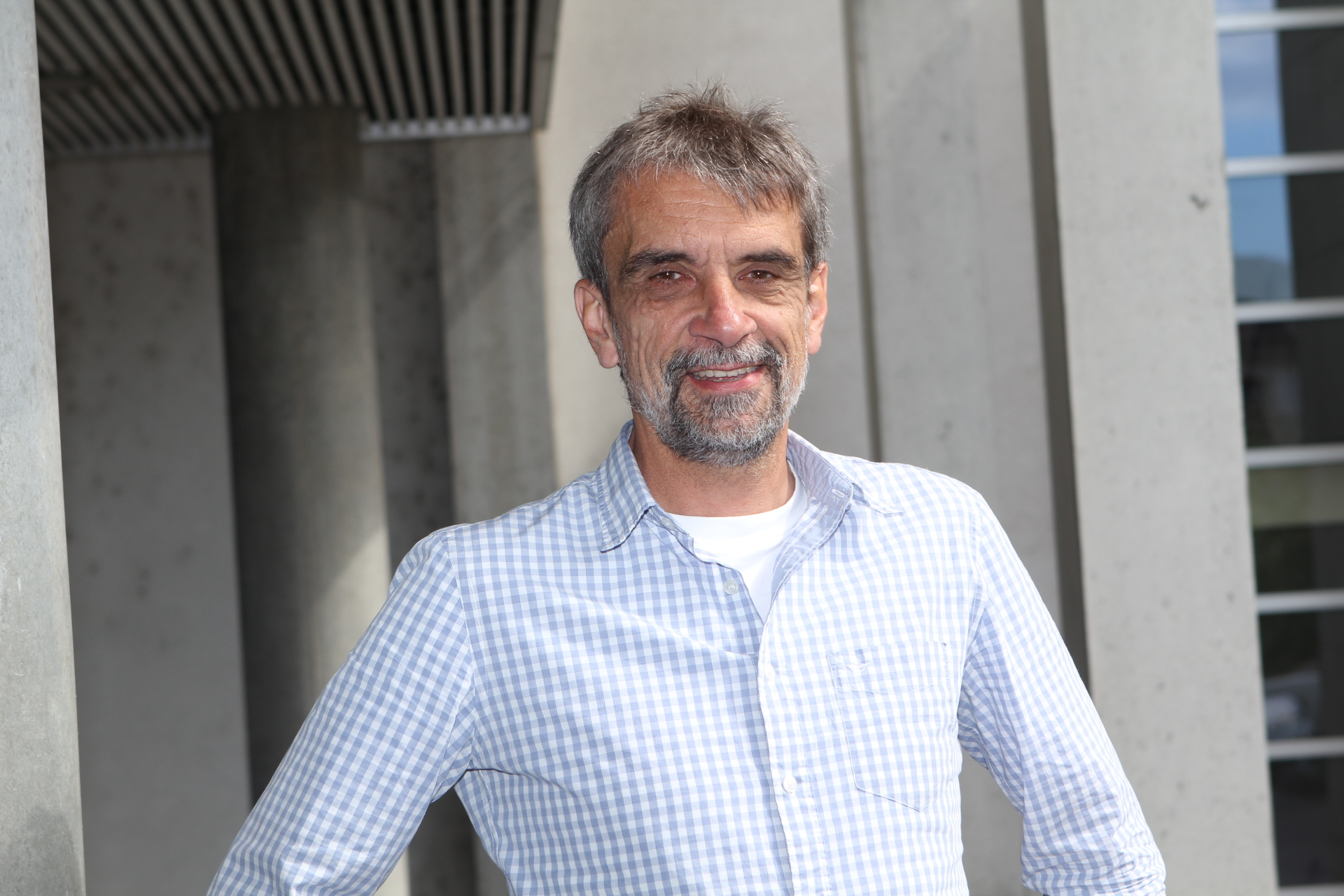
- Rüegg in 2015
- Awards: Robert Bing Prize (2000); Lelio Orci Award (2021)
- Scientific career
- Fields: Neurobiology
- Workplaces: University of Zürich, Stanford University, Biozentrum University of Basel

Markus Rüegg is a Swiss neurobiologist and professor at the Biozentrum of the University of Basel.

== Life ==
Markus Rüegg studied biochemistry at the University of Zurich and graduated with a PhD in the field of Neurobiology. In 1989 he went as a postdoctoral fellow to conduct research at the Department of Neurobiology at Stanford University School of Medicine. In 1992 he was appointed as Assistant Professor to the Biozentrum, University of Basel. Since 1998 he is a Professor of Neurobiology and teaches and conducts research at the Biozentrum of the University of Basel. Based on his research findings he co-founded the first spin-off company (MyoContract Ltd) of the Biozentrum in 2000, which merged in 2004 to become Santhera Pharmaceuticals Ltd. As of August 2021, he co-founded SEAL Therapeutics Ltd. and acts as its CEO. SEAL Therapeutics Ltd. aims to develop a gene therapy for the severe LAMA2-related muscular dystrophy (LAMA2 MD). He is also scientific advisor to several biotech companies for rare diseases, board member on several patient organizations for neuromuscular diseases and scientific editor for several renowned magazines.

== Work ==
Rüegg studies the molecular principles that are essential for the development and the maintenance of the neuromuscular system. The major achievements of his earlier work include the isolation and functional characterization of proteins involved in axonal pathfinding, synapse formation and in mediating changes in synapse structure upon learning. Furthermore, for the last 20 years his laboratory is interested in understanding the disease mechanisms involved in congenital muscular dystrophies and recent findings of his laboratory have led to the development of a novel therapeutic strategy. In addition, his research group has recently demonstrated that the multi-protein complex mTORC1 is essential for muscle homeostasis and is associated to precocious sarcopenia, the loss of muscle mass and function at advanced age. This knowledge may help to counteract pathological muscle degradation and to develop new therapeutic strategies.

== Awards and honors ==
- 2000 Robert Bing Prize of the Swiss Academy of Medical Sciences
- 2013 Chairman of the Scientific Advisory Board of the " Swiss Foundation for Research on Muscle Diseases " (SSEM)
- 2021 Lelio Orci Award

== Notable publications ==
- Ruegg, M.A., Tsim, K.W., Horton, S.E., Kröger, S., Escher, G., Gensch, E.M., and McMahan, U.J. (1992). The agrin gene codes for a family of basal lamina proteins that differ in function and distribution. Neuron 8, 691-699. PMID 1314621
- Gesemann, M., V. Cavalli, et al. (1996). "Alternative splicing of agrin alters its binding to heparin, dystroglycan, and the putative agrin receptor." Neuron 16(4): 755-767. PMID 8607994
- Moll, J., Barzaghi, P., Lin, S., Bezakova, G., Lochmuller, H., Engvall, E., Muller, U., and Ruegg, M.A. (2001). An agrin minigene rescues dystrophic symptoms in a mouse model for congenital muscular dystrophy. Nature 413, 302-307. PMID 11565031
- Bentzinger, C.F., Romanino, K., Cloetta, D., Lin, S., Mascarenhas, J.B., Oliveri, F., Xia, J., Casanova, E., Costa, C.F., Brink, M., Zorzato, F., Hall, M.N., and Rüegg, M.A. (2008). Skeletal muscle-specific ablation of raptor, but not of rictor, causes metabolic changes and results in muscle dystrophy. Cell Metab 8, 411-424. PMID 19046572
- Castets, P., Lin, S., Rion, N., Di Fulvio, S., Romanino, K., Guridi, M., Frank, S., Tintignac, L.A., Sinnreich, M., and Ruegg, M.A. (2013). Sustained Activation of mTORC1 in Skeletal Muscle Inhibits Constitutive and Starvation-Induced Autophagy and Causes a Severe, Late-Onset Myopathy. Cell Metab 17, 731-744. PMID 23602450
- Guridi, M., Tintignac, L. A., Lin, S., Kupr, B., Castets, P. and Ruegg, M. A. (2015) 'Activation of mTORC1 in skeletal muscle regulates whole-body metabolism through FGF21', Science Signaling, 8(402), p. ra113. PMID 26554817
- Reinhard, J. R., Lin, S., McKee, K. K., Meinen, S., Crosson, S. C., Sury, M., Hobbs, S., Maier, G., Yurchenco, P. D. and Ruegg, M. A. (2017) 'Linker proteins restore basement membrane and correct LAMA2-related muscular dystrophy in mice', Science Translational Medicine, 9(396), p. eaal4649. PMID 28659438
- Ham, D. J., Börsch, A., Lin, S., Thürkauf, M., Weihrauch, M., Reinhard, J. R., Delezie, J., Battilana, F., Wang, X., Kaiser, M. S., Guridi, M., Sinnreich, M., Rich, M. M., Mittal, N., Tintignac, L. A., Handschin, C., Zavolan, M. and Ruegg, M. A. (2020) 'The neuromuscular junction is a focal point of mTORC1 signaling in sarcopenia', Nature Communications, 11(1), p. 4510. PMID 32908143
