= Tilman Schirmer =

Structural biologist

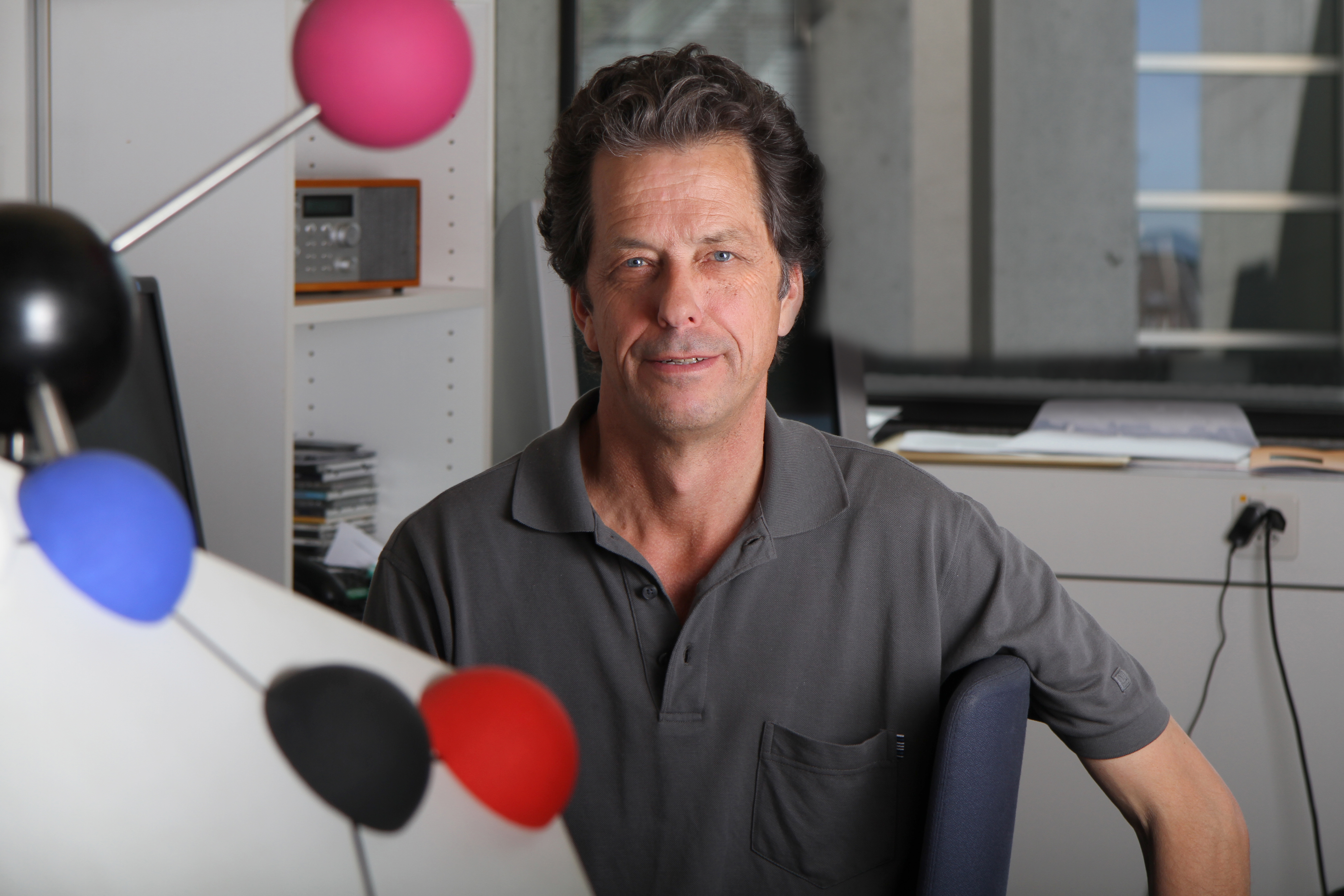
- Tilman Schirmer (2011)
- Scientific career
- Fields: Structural biologist
- Workplaces: University of Konstanz; University of Vienna; LMU Munich; Max Planck Institute for Biochemistry; MRC Laboratory of Molecular Biology; Biozentrum University of Basel

Tilman Schirmer is a structural biologist and was a Professor at the Biozentrum of the University of Basel.

== Life ==
Tilman Schirmer studied physics at the University of Konstanz, the University of Vienna, and at LMU Munich. In 1985, he obtained his doctorate at the Max Planck Institute for Biochemistry in Martinsried. He subsequently conducted research at the MRC Laboratory of Molecular Biology in Cambridge, United Kingdom. In 1989, Schirmer joined the Biozentrum University of Basel, initially as a group leader and was appointed as Associate Professor of Structural Biology in 1997. Since 2020, he is an emeritus professor.

== Work ==
Schirmer investigates the mechanism of action of bacterial proteins based on their spatial structures, which are determined using X-ray crystallography. This has provided insights into light harvesting in photosynthetic antenna complexes, the allosteric regulation of phosphofructokinase and the translocation of small molecules through the porins of the outer membrane. As of 2013, Schirmer’s research group at the Biozentrum in Basel is studying the mechanisms of signal transduction of the messenger substrate cyclic di-GMP and the structure-function relationships of bacterial effector proteins with AMP-transferase activity. The goal is the elucidation of fundamental biological interrelationships on the molecular level.

== Awards and honors ==
- 1986 Otto Hahn Medal of the Max Planck Society
- 1988 Long-Term Fellowship of the European Molecular Biology Organization (EMBO)
