= Peter Scheiffele =

German neurobiologist

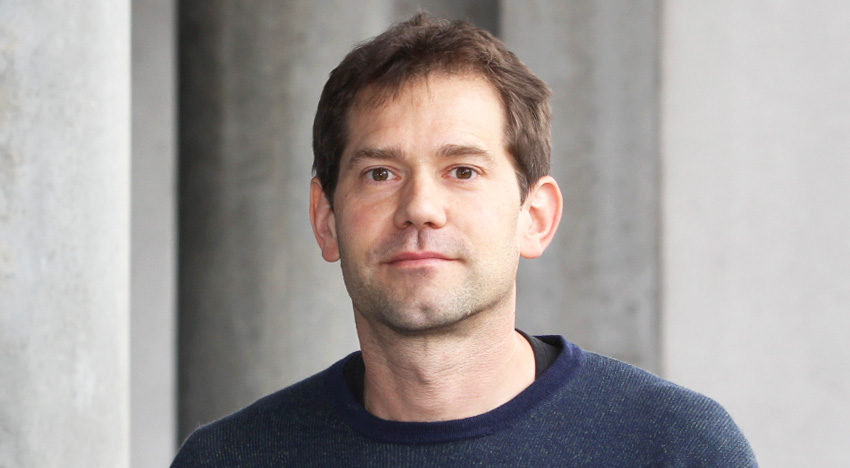
- Peter Scheiffele (2014)
- Education: Freie Universität Berlin
- Awards: Alfred P. Sloan Research Fellow (2002); Elected Member of the European Molecular Biology Organization (EMBO) (2013)
- Scientific career
- Fields: Neurobiology
- Workplaces: Freie Universität Berlin, EMBL Heidelberg, University of California Berkeley, University of California San Francisco, Columbia University New York, Biozentrum University of Basel

Peter Scheiffele (born 21 December 1969 in Berlin) is a German neurobiologist who conducts research at the Biozentrum of the University of Basel, Switzerland.

== Life ==
Peter Scheiffele studied biochemistry at the Freie Universität Berlin. In 1998 he earned his doctorate from the EMBL in Heidelberg and subsequently worked as a postdoc at the University of California, Berkeley, and the University of California in San Francisco. In 2001 he was appointed as an assistant professor in the Department of Physiology & Cellular Biophysics at Columbia University, New York, and conducted research in the field of neurobiology. Since 2008 Peter Scheiffele has been a Professor of Cell and Developmental Biology at the Biozentrum of the University of Basel.

== Work ==
Scheiffele investigates the mechanisms in the formation of neuronal networks in the central nervous system. His focus is the formation of synapses. Peter Scheiffele discovered that the neuronal adhesion molecules neuroligin and neurexin play an important role in synapse formation. In his current work he is collaborating with a network of European researchers to investigate pathophysiology and explore treatment approaches for autism spectrum disorders.

== Awards & honors ==
- 2002 Alfred P. Sloan Research Fellow
- 2002 Searle Scholar Award
- 2004 John Merck Scholar Award
- 2005 Simons Foundation Young Investigator Award
- 2013 elected Member of the European Molecular Biology Organization (EMBO)
- 2014 Robert Bing Prize of the Swiss Academy of Medical Sciences
- 2015 ERC Advanced Grants
- 2022 SNSF Advanced Grant
