= Christoph Handschin =

Swiss cell biologist

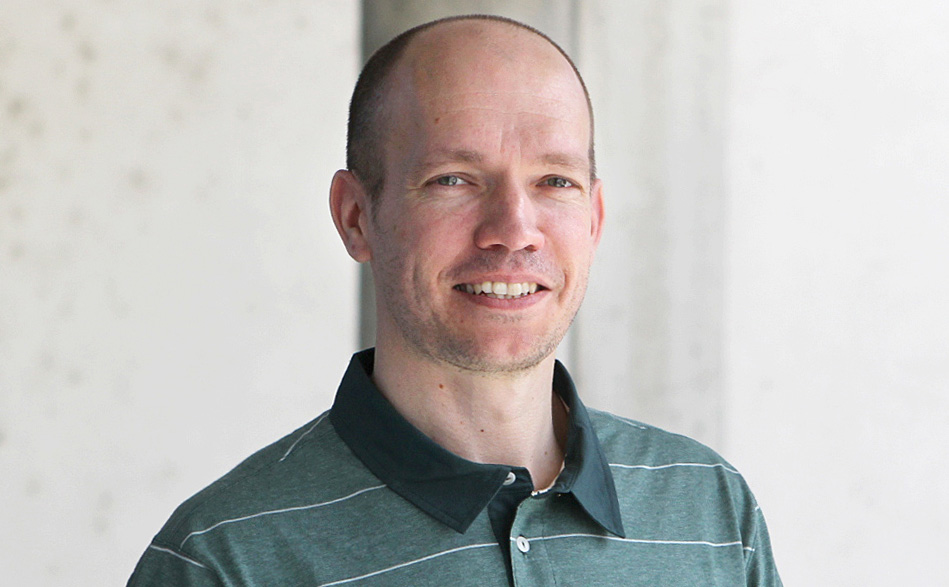
- Christoph Handschin (2015)
- Scientific career
- Fields: Cell biology
- Workplaces: Dana–Farber Cancer Institute, Harvard Medical School, University of Zürich, Biozentrum University of Basel

Christoph Handschin is a Swiss cell biologist at the Biozentrum University of Basel.

== Life ==
Handschin studied biology at the University of Basel. He completed his doctorate in biochemistry in Urs A. Meyer's group at the Biozentrum. From 2002 to 2006, Handschin carried out research at the Dana–Farber Cancer Institute and the Harvard Medical School, before being appointed as an assistant professor of physiology and an SNSF professor to the University of Zurich in 2006 . In 2009 he returned to the Biozentrum, where he works in research and teaching as a professor of pharmacology.

== Work ==
Handschin studies the molecular processes underlying trained or diseased muscles. Central to his research is the protein PGC-1α that has a significant influence on metabolism and muscle function. Handschin demonstrated that PGC-1 α centrally steers the adaptive mechanisms of the muscle during endurance training. PGC-1α increases the endurance capacity of the muscle by among other things regulating the formation and degradation of lactate. Furthermore, Handschin discovered that an elevated PGC-1α production manifests a therapeutic effect on muscle wasting and dystrophies. Although his findings provide concrete approaches for the treatment of muscle diseases and age-related muscle wasting, attempts to drug the target have not been successful so far. Moreover, the insights gained on the Regulation of heme biosynthesis were highly relevant for the understanding of porphyria.

== Awards and honors ==
- 2013 European Research Council ERC Consolidator Grant
- 2008 Award ("Wissenschaftspreis") of the Walter and Gertrud Siegenthaler-Stiftung
- 2006 SNSF Professorship of the Swiss National Science
- 2004 Scientist Career Development Award, Muscular Dystrophy Association USA (MDA)
