= Erich Nigg =

Swiss cell biologist

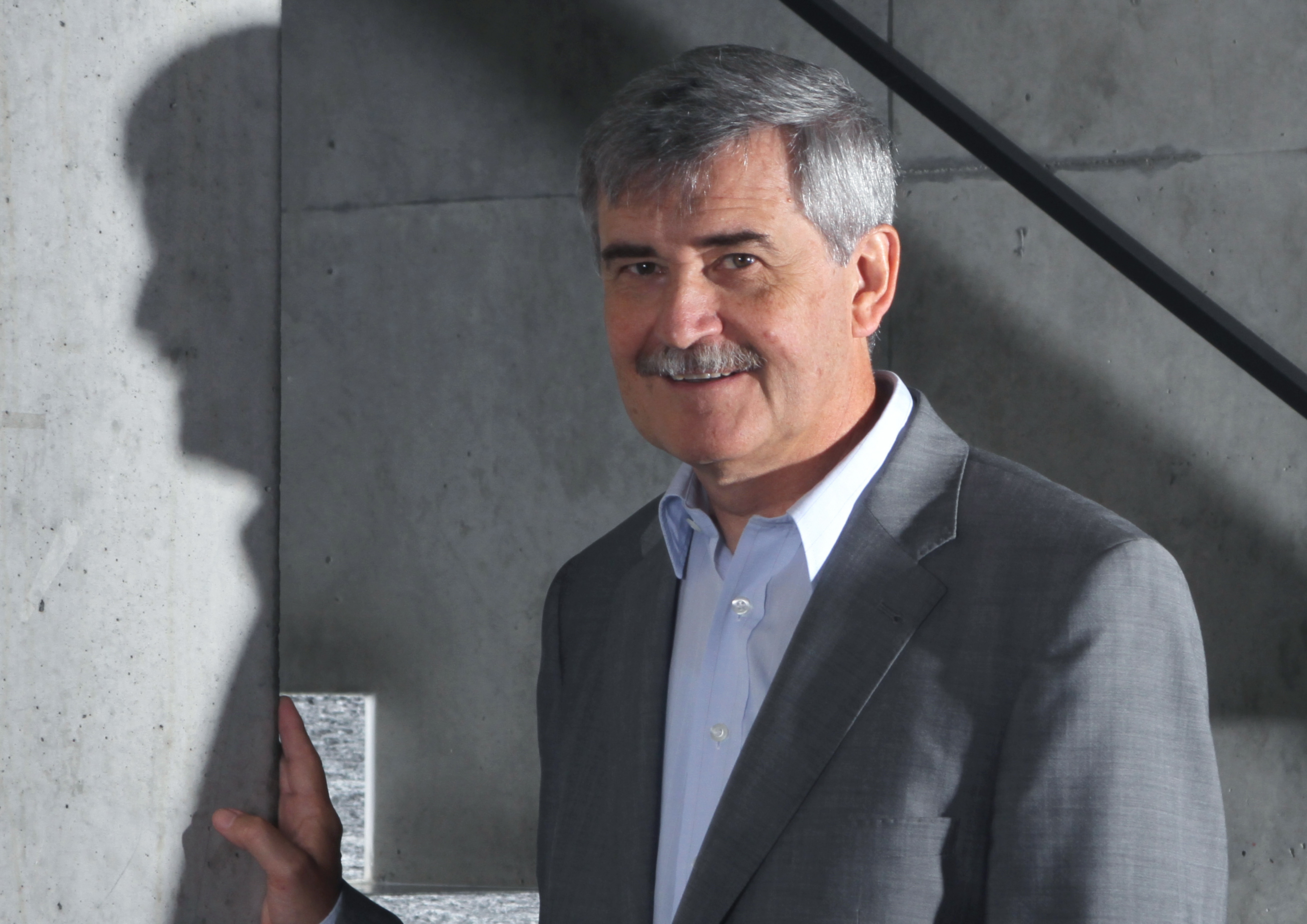
- Erich Nigg (2011)
- Born: 28 November 1952 (age 73)
- Scientific career
- Fields: Cell Biologist
- Workplaces: Swiss Institute for Experimental Cancer Research, University of Geneva Max Planck Institute of Biochemistry, Biozentrum University of Basel

Erich Nigg (born 28 November 1952 in Uster) is a Swiss cell biologist.

== Life ==
Erich Nigg received his PhD in 1980 from the ETH Zürich (Biochemistry). Subsequently, he carried out research at the University of California, San Diego, the ETH Zürich and the Swiss Institute for Experimental Cancer Research (ISREC). From 1995 he was Professor of Molecular Biology at the University of Geneva before he was appointed, in 1999, to a Directorship at the Max Planck Institute of Biochemistry in Martinsried, Germany. From 2009 - 2018 was Erich Nigg Professor of Cell Biology and Director of the Biozentrum at the University of Basel, Switzerland.

== Work ==
After early work on biological membranes, the structure of the cell nucleus and mechanisms of intracellular signal transduction, Erich Nigg's research focused on the cell cycle. His studies contribute to our understanding of the segregation of human chromosomes during cell division, the regulation of mitosis, as well as the structure and function of human centrosomes. This work is relevant to understanding diseases, because mitotic errors contribute to the genetic instability of cancer cells and centrosome abnormalities are known to cause disease (brain diseases and ciliopathies).

== Awards and honors ==
- 1991: Elected Member of the European Molecular Biology Organization (EMBO)
- 1992: Friedrich Miescher Prize
- 1993: Robert Wenner Prize for Cancer Research
- 1998: Elected Member of the Academia Europaea
- 2004: Meyenburg Prize of Wilhelm and Maria Meyenburg Foundation
- 2009: Elected member of the European Academy of Cancer Sciences
