= Heinrich Reichert =

Swiss developmental and Neurobiologist (1949–2019)

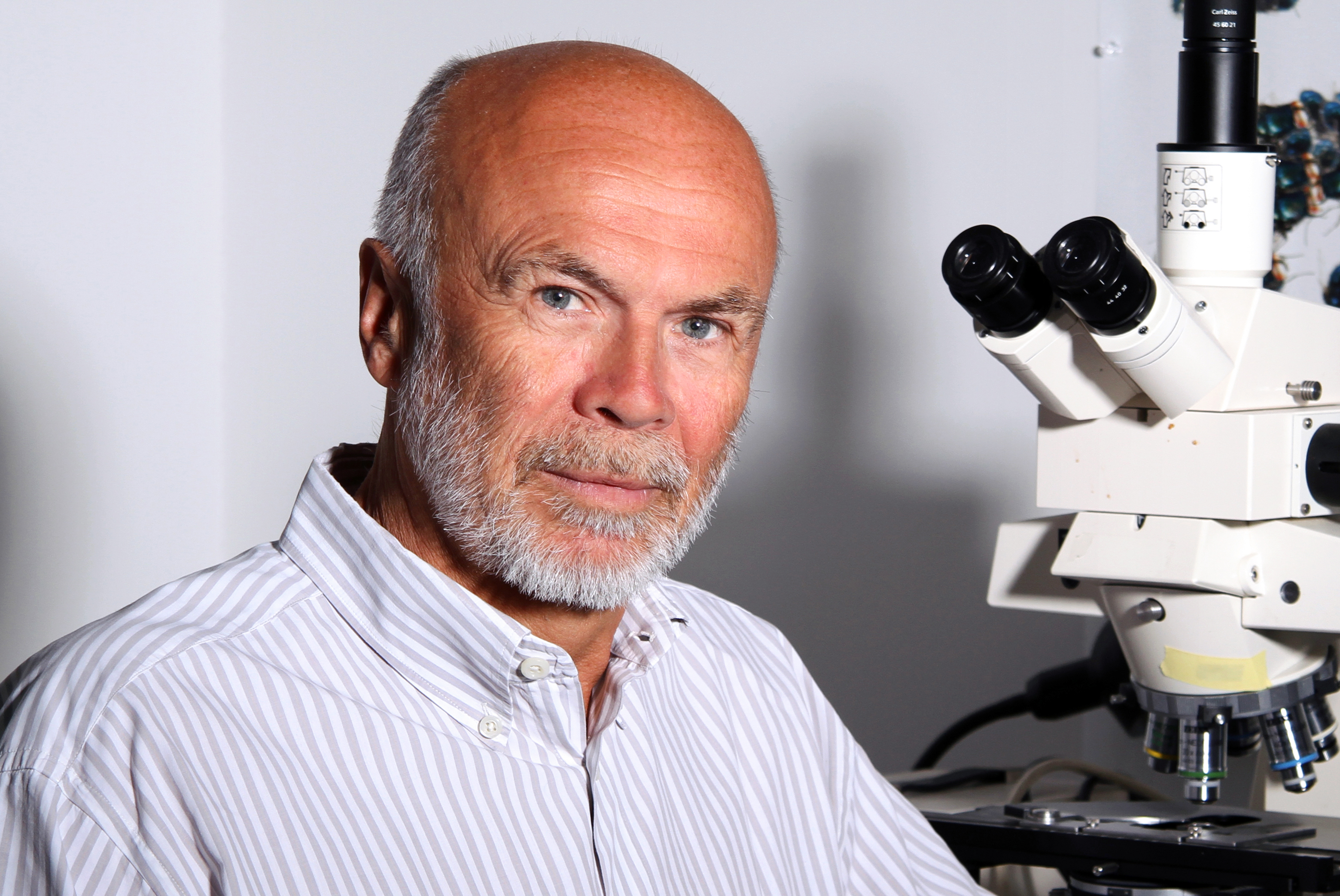
- Reichert in 2011
- Born: 1949
- Died: 13 June 2019
- Scientific career
- Fields: Developmental biology, Neurobiology
- Workplaces: University of Karlsruhe, University of Freiburg, Stanford University, Biozentrum University of Basel

Heinrich Reichert (1949 – June 13, 2019) was a Swiss developmental and neurobiologist at the Biozentrum University of Basel.

== Life ==
Heinrich Reichert studied physics, chemistry and biology at the University of Karlsruhe. After graduating with a doctorate in the field of genetics from the University of Freiburg, Germany, in 1979 he went to Stanford University, in California. In 1982 Reichert moved to the Zoological Institute at the University of Basel and between 1986 and 1991 he was a faculty member at the University of Geneva before returning to the University of Basel. Reichert remained as a professor at the Zoological Institute until 2006, when he moved to the Biozentrum of the University of Basel where he continued to teach and research. He died on 13 June 2019.

== Work ==
Reichert investigated the role of neural stem cells in the development of the brain using the fruit fly Drosophila as a model. He discovered a molecular production program followed by stem cells as they develop in the brain. A similar, evolutionary conserved developmental program also plays a role in the formation of the brain in vertebrates. If this program is disrupted by specific Gene mutations, an uncontrolled production of misprogrammed cells results, which divide in an uncontrolled manner, leading to the development of lethal brain tumors. How exactly such genetic aberrations in the formation of stem cells come about is subject of Reichert’s research. His goal was to find new strategies to prevent such brain tumors.

== Awards and honors ==
- 2000 Neurex founding member and Vice President
- 2005 Scientific member of the European Doctoral School, Strasbourg
