= Guy R. Cornelis =

Belgian microbiologist

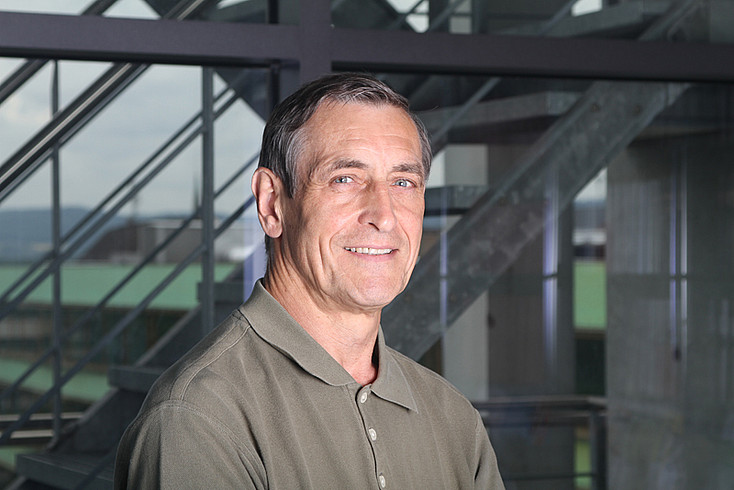
- Guy R. Cornelis (2011)
- Known for: Bacterial infectious diseases
- Scientific career
- Fields: Microbiology
- Workplaces: Université catholique de Louvain, University of Freiburg Max Planck Institute for Plant Breeding Research Biozentrum University of Basel

Guy R. Cornelis is a Belgian microbiologist.

== Life ==
Cornelis graduated in pharmacist, studied in Oxford, UK and received his PhD from the University of Louvain, Belgium in 1974. He studied antibiotic resistance plasmids in Bristol (UK) and transposons at the University of Freiburg and at the Max Planck Institute in Cologne, Germany. After his appointment as Professor in Louvain in 1984, he investigated bacterial pathogenesis and joined in 1991 the Christian de Duve Institute in Brussels. In 2001, he was appointed Professor of Molecular Microbiology at the Biozentrum, University of Basel, Switzerland. Since emeritus in 2012, he pursues his research at the University of Namur, Belgium.

== Work ==
Cornelis investigates the complex mechanisms of bacterial infectious diseases. He received particular recognition for the co-discovery with H. Wolf-Watz (Umea, Sweden) of the bacterial type III secretion system (T3SS). T3SS is a mechanism by which many bacteria inject a cocktail of toxins, so-called effector proteins into animal, plant or insect cells. The effectors disarm or reprogram the target cell by sabotaging the cellular signaling network. The T3SS apparatus, called injectisome, is a complex nanosyringe made of more than 25 different proteins. Since 2004, Cornelis also studies Capnocytophaga canimorsus, a bacterium from dog's mouths responsible for fatal infections in humans.

Cornelis belongs to the world’s most cited scientists.

== Awards and honors ==
- 1980: Prize of the Belgian Royal Academy of Medicine
- 1985: Pfizer Prize
- 1993: Member of the Belgian Royal Academy of Medicine
- 1998 Elected Member of the European Molecular Biology Organization (EMBO)
- 2008: Member of the American Academy for Microbiology (AAM)
