= Johan Jansonius =

Dutch structural biologist (1932–2022)

Johan Nomdo Jansonius (1932 – 2 January 2022) was a Dutch chemist and structural biologist. He spent his career at the Biozentrum University of Basel where he was professor of structural biology between 1973 and 1998.

== Life ==
Jansonius was born in the Netherlands in 1932. He studied chemistry. Jansonius obtained his PhD from the University of Groningen in 1967 with a thesis titled: "De kristalstructuur van papaïne : een röntgendiffractie-onderzoek met een oplossend vermogen van 4,5 Å". He subsequently was lector of protein structure chemistry at the same university between 1971 and 1973. He was professor of structural biology at the University of Basel between 1973 and 1998 and introduced the field of protein crystallography there. He joined the newly founded Biozentrum University of Basel, of which he later served as chair from 1989 to 1991.

He was one of the founders of the field of crystallography in Switzerland. Apart from his work in the field of protein crystallography he performed research on enzymes related to metabolism. Jansonius looked into the vitamin B6 dependent enzymes and their structure-function relationship. He clarified the structure of five of those enzymes. Jansonius also worked on thermophilic enzymes.

Jansonius was elected a corresponding member of the Royal Netherlands Academy of Arts and Sciences in 1988. He died on 2 February 2022 in Therwil, Switzerland, aged 89.
