= Martin Spiess =

Swiss biochemist

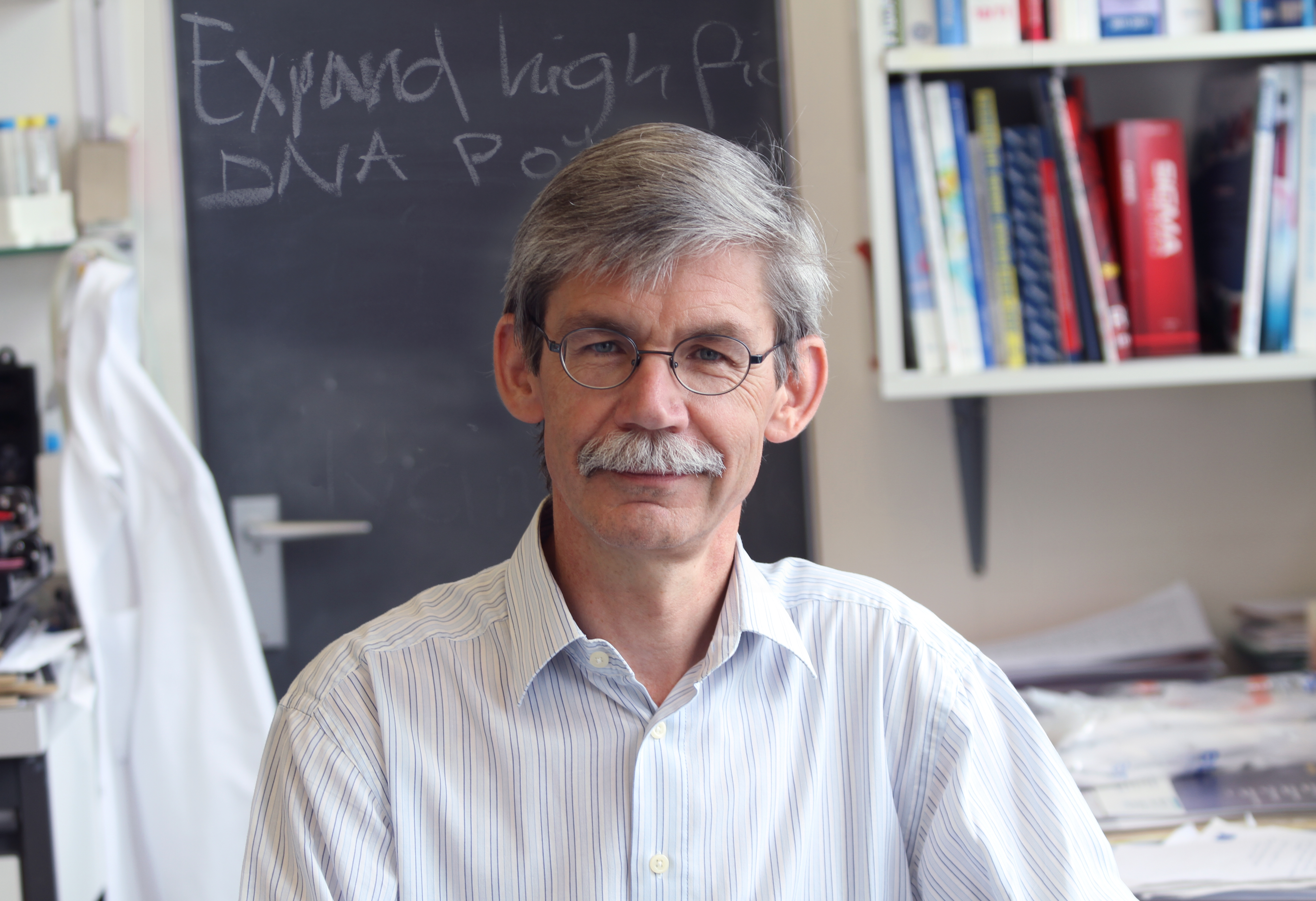
- Martin Spiess (2011)
- Born: 11 October 1955 (age 70); Zürich
- Scientific career
- Fields: Biochemistry
- Workplaces: ETH Zürich, Massachusetts Institute of Technology, Whitehead Institute, Biozentrum University of Basel

Martin Spiess (born 11 October 1955 in Zürich) is a Swiss Biochemist and former professor at the Biozentrum University of Basel, Switzerland.

== Life ==
Martin Spiess studied and graduated with a doctorate in biochemistry at the ETH Zurich. In 1983 he began research as a postdoc at the Massachusetts Institute of Technology and the Whitehead Institute in Cambridge, USA, returning in 1985 to the ETH Zurich. In 1986 he was appointed assistant professor at the Biozentrum of the University of Basel, where he has taught and conducted research as associate professor since 1993 and as professor of biochemistry from 2004 to 2021. From 2010 to 2012, and from 2017 to 2021 Spiess served as Dean of the Faculty of Science.

== Work ==
Martin Spiess investigates topogenesis and the intracellular transport of membrane proteins in eukaryotic cells. He studies the mechanism of translocon function and how proteins are sorted in the cell and transported to their designated organelles. Spiess discovered that the translocon, in particular the asymmetric polarity along the pore, determines the thermodynamic equilibrium between integration of individual proteins segments into the cell membrane and their further transport. Further studies demonstrated that the orientation of transmembrane segments are defined through the flanking charges, the folding of neighboring segments as well as the hydrophobic properties of the sequences themselves.

== Awards and honors ==
- 1989 FEBS Anniversary Prize of the Society for Biochemistry and Molecular Biology (GBM)
- 1991 Helmut Horten Incentive Prize
- 1997 Elected Member of the European Molecular Biology Organization (EMBO)
