= Alexander F. Schier =

Swiss biologist

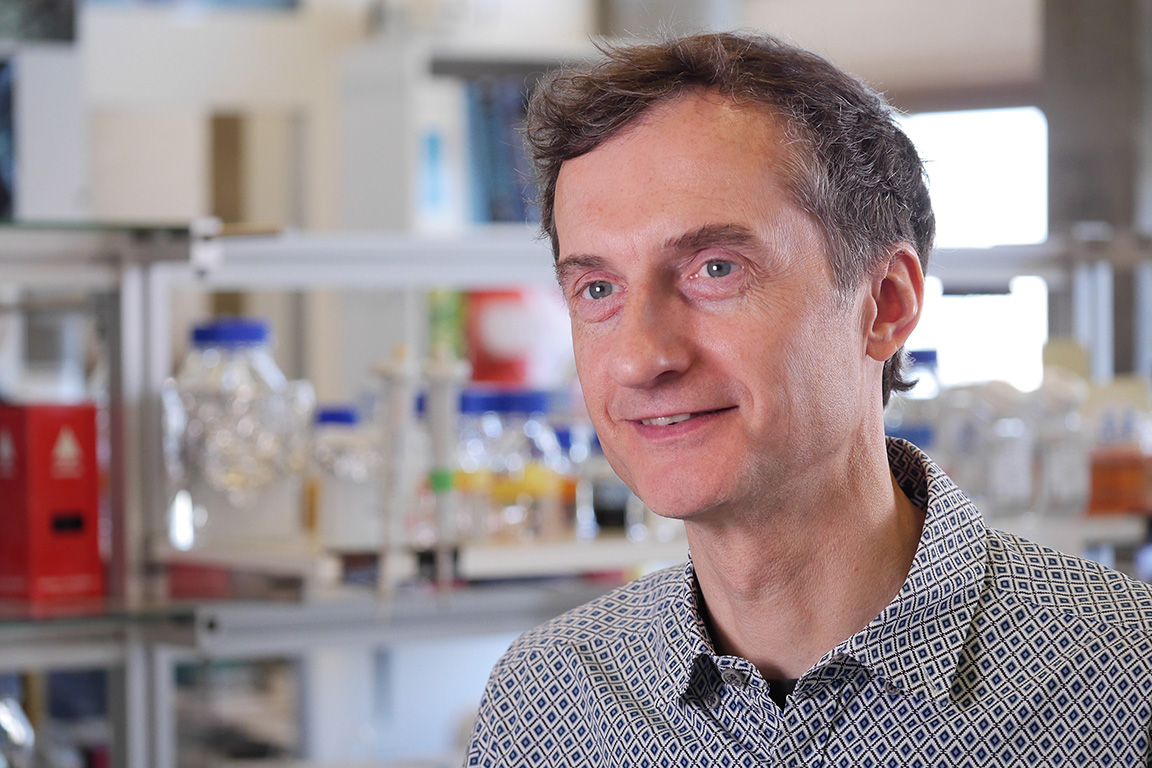
- Alexander F. Schier (2017)
- Born: 1964 (age 61–62); Basel, Switzerland
- Citizenship: Switzerland, USA
- Education: University of Basel (1988)
- Known for: Research with zebrafish (Danio rerio); Embryogenesis; Sleep
- Awards: McKnight Scholar for Neuroscience (1999-2002); Irma T. Hirschl Scholar (2001-2005); McKnight Neuroscience of Brain Disorders Award (2006-2008); Everett Mendelsohn Excellence in Mentoring Award (2014); NIH MERIT Award (2016); NIH Pioneer Award (2017); Election to EMBO (2018); Science Breakthrough of the Year (2018); ERC Advanced Grant (2020); George Streisinger Award of the International Zebrafish Society (2020); Election to National Academy of Sciences (2020); Election to Academia Europaea (2020); AAAS Fellow, American Association for the Advancement of Science (2021)
- Scientific career
- Fields: Cell Biology; Development; Genetics; Neurobiology; Behavior
- Workplaces: Biozentrum of the University of Basel (Switzerland); Massachusetts General Hospital, Boston (USA); Skirball Institute, NYU School of Medicine (USA); Department of Molecular and Cellular Biology, Harvard University (USA)
- Doctoral advisor: Walter J. Gehring
- Other academic advisors: Wolfgang Driever

Alexander F. Schier (born 1964) is a Professor of Cell Biology and the Director of the Biozentrum University of Basel, Switzerland.

Schier received a B.A. in cell biology in 1988 from the Biozentrum of the University of Basel, Switzerland, followed by a PhD in cell biology in 1992 under Walter J. Gehring, also from the University of Basel, Switzerland. He conducted his postdoctoral research in Wolfgang Driever's lab at the Massachusetts General Hospital and Harvard University in Boston, US. In 1996, Schier was recruited as assistant professor in the Developmental Genetics Program to the Skirball Institute and Department of Cell Biology, NYU School of Medicine.

From 2005 to 2019, he was a professor at the Department of Molecular and Cellular Biology, Harvard University, Faculty of Arts and Sciences. In 2013 he became the Leo Erikson Life Sciences Professor. He chaired the Department of Molecular and Cellular Biology from 2014 to 2017. Since 2017 Schier is a site director of the Allen Discovery Center for Cell Lineage Tracing. In 2018, Schier became the Director of the Biozentrum of the University of Basel as well as Professor of Cell Biology.

== Research ==
Schier is internationally recognized for his pioneering work on vertebrate development using zebrafish (Danio rerio) as a model organism. During his postdoctoral work, Schier and colleagues performed one of the first large-scale forward genetic screens in a vertebrate.

In his own lab, Schier has made fundamental contributions to the understanding of the molecular basis of vertebrate embryogenesis, including signaling, cell fate determination, cell movement, the maternal-zygotic transition, microRNAs, chromatin and non-coding RNAs. Schier's more recent interest in behavior has established zebrafish as a model for sleep and behavioral research, determined neural circuits that underlie sleep identified small molecule sleep regulators and studied the roles of schizophrenia-associated genes REF Thyme Cell 2019.

He has contributed to the development of zebrafish as model system, including positional cloning, germ-line replacement to generate maternal-effect mutants, photobleaching and photo conversion, Brainbow imaging, brain activity atlas, small molecule profiling, transcriptomics and epigenomics, gene annotation, CRISPR/Cas9 genome editing, lineage tracing by genomic barcode editing and reconstruction of developmental trajectories by single-cell RNA-sequencing.

== Mentoring ==
Schier is also well known for having an unusually high rate of placing trainees in academic positions. Previous mentees have gone on to PI positions at Yale, Princeton, Caltech, UCLA, University of Toronto, U Mass Amherst, NYU School of Medicine, University College London, MPI Dresden, University of Tokyo, UCSD, University of Calgary, MPI Tuebingen, IMP Vienna, University of Utah, Cambridge University and NIH. Key to his mentoring philosophy are five questions he has developed to sharpen the thoughts of his mentees:

- Do you work on an important problem?
- Do you work with sustained concentration?
- Do you have a sense of urgency?
- Are you able to troubleshoot?
- Do you have the killer instinct to do the key experiments that will result in a coherent, conclusive and publishable study?

== Awards ==
- 1999-2002 McKnight Scholar for Neuroscience
- 2001-2005 Irma T. Hirschl Scholar
- 2002-2005 Established Investigator of the American Heart Association
- 2006 Harland Winfield Mossman Developmental Biologists Award of the American Asc. of Anatomists
- 2006-2008 McKnight Neuroscience of Brain Disorders Award
- 2014 Everett Mendelsohn Excellence in Mentoring Award from Harvard's Graduate Student Council
- 2016 NIH MERIT Award
- 2016 Bjorkman-Strominger-Wiley Prize for Collaboration (with Florian Engert)
- 2017 NIH Pioneer Award
- 2018 Election to EMBO
- 2018 Science "Breakthrough of the Year 2018"
- 2020 ERC Advanced Grant
- 2020 George Streisinger Award of the International Zebrafish Society
- 2020 Election to National Academy of Sciences
- 2020 Election to Academia Europaea
- 2021 Fellow of the American Association for the Advancement of Science
