= Hans-Peter Hauri =

Swiss biologist

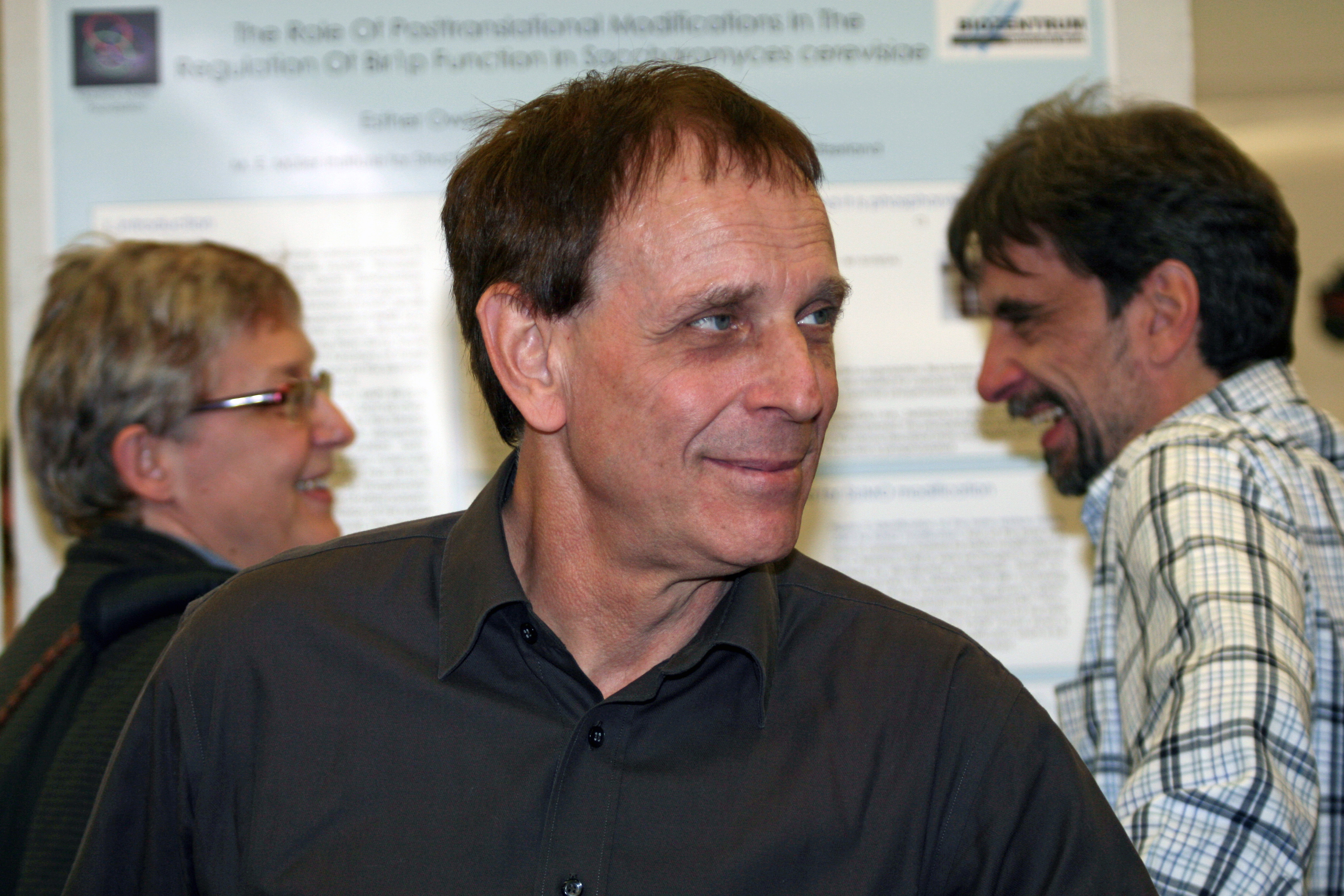
- Hans-Peter Hauri in 2008
- Born: 13 February 1945 (age 81); Zürich, Switzerland
- Scientific career
- Fields: Biologist
- Workplaces: University of Zurich, University Hospital of Bern, Massachusetts General Hospital, Harvard University, Biozentrum, University of Basel

Hans-Peter Hauri (born 13 February 1945 in Zürich) is a Swiss biologist

== Life ==
Hans-Peter Hauri, Professor emeritus of Cell Biology, conducted research at the Biozentrum of the University of Basel from 1983 to 2010. After completing biology studies at the University of Zurich followed by a doctoral thesis in 1973, he joined the Pediatric Clinic at the University Hospital of Bern. In 1978 he moved as a postdoc to the Massachusetts General Hospital and Harvard University, in Boston. In 1980 he returned to Switzerland and began research in Urs A. Meyer‘s Group, initially at the University of Zurich and later at the Biozentrum. Here he was appointed Associate Professor and in 2004 Professor of Cell Biology. In addition, he served as Director of Studies in Biology and Dean of the Faculty of Science at the University of Basel.

Hauri completed his doctoral dissertation, Ein invasives Neoplasma aus embryonalen Zellen von Drosophila melanogaster in Dauerkultur in vivo, at the University of Zürich in 1974.

== Work ==
Hans-Peter Hauri studied protein secretion, involving the movement of these proteins from the site of synthesis to their intended destination, during which the integrity of the cell organelles remained preserved. Hauri discovered that the membrane protein CLIMP-63 mediates the interaction of the endoplasmic reticulum (ER) and microtubules. In addition, he successfully established the ER-Golgi-intermediate compartment (ERGIC) as a cell organelle of the secretory pathway and could show that secretory proteins, produced in the ER, reach the Golgi apparatus via ERGIC. Using a screening method, which he developed, he succeeded to systematically record protein interactions in the secretory pathway in living cells. Furthermore, he also elucidated the signaling networks of the secretory process.
