= Urs Jenal =

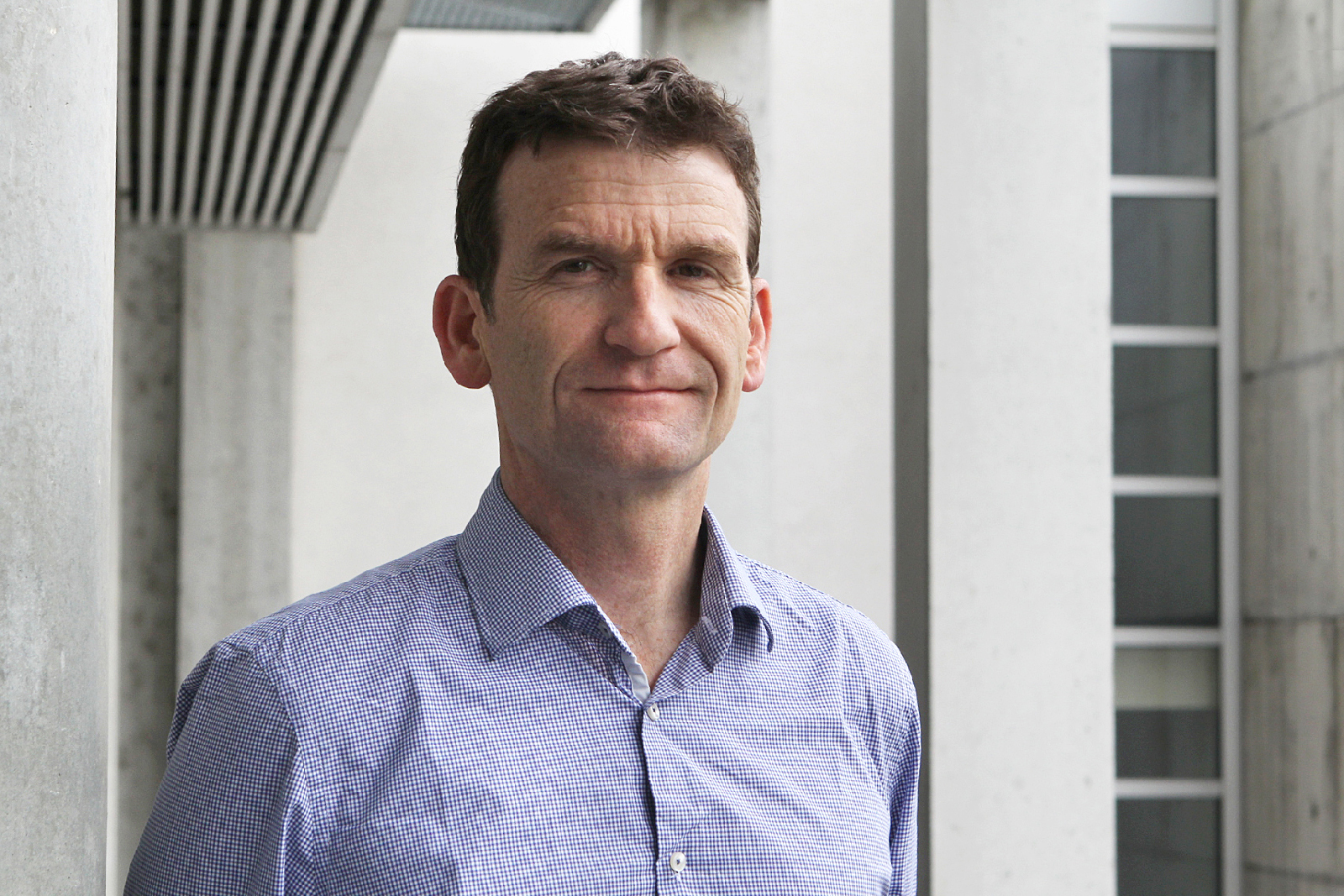
- Urs Jenal (2015)
- Scientific career
- Fields: Experimental Biologist
- Workplaces: ETH Zurich, Stanford University, Biozentrum University of Basel

Urs Jenal is a Swiss Microbiologist and Professor at the Biozentrum University of Basel, Switzerland.

== Life ==
Urs Jenal studied Experimental Biology at the Swiss Federal Institute of Technology (ETH) Zurich and received his PhD from there in 1991. Subsequently, he completed postdoctoral research at the ETH Zurich and at Stanford University, USA. Since 1996, Jenal has taught and conducted research at the Biozentrum University of Basel; first as an Assistant Professor and since 2002 as a Professor of Molecular Microbiology.

== Work ==
The research of Urs Jenal explores the molecular basis of signal transduction controlling the growth, development and behavior of bacteria. Jenal received international acclaim through his discovery of a new signalling network, which is based on the cyclic di-nucleotide (c-di-GMP) and which coordinates bacterial surface colonization and virulence during chronic bacterial infections. With the model bacterium Caulobacter crescentus, Jenal discovered that c-di-GMP controls the transition from motile bacteria to a sedentary biofilm-forming structure and how this process is coordinated with the replication cycle of these cells. Jenal’s most recent work has investigated the importance of signalling and metabolism for chronic lung infections caused by Pseudomonas aeruginosa in patients with cystic fibrosis.

== Awards and honors ==
- 2011: Elected member of the American Academy of Microbiology (AAM)
- 2012: Elected member of the European Molecular Biology Organization (EMBO)
- 2014: Elected member of the European Academy of Microbiology (EAM)
- 2013: ERC Advanced Investigator Award
