= Erik van Nimwegen =

Dutch computational biologist

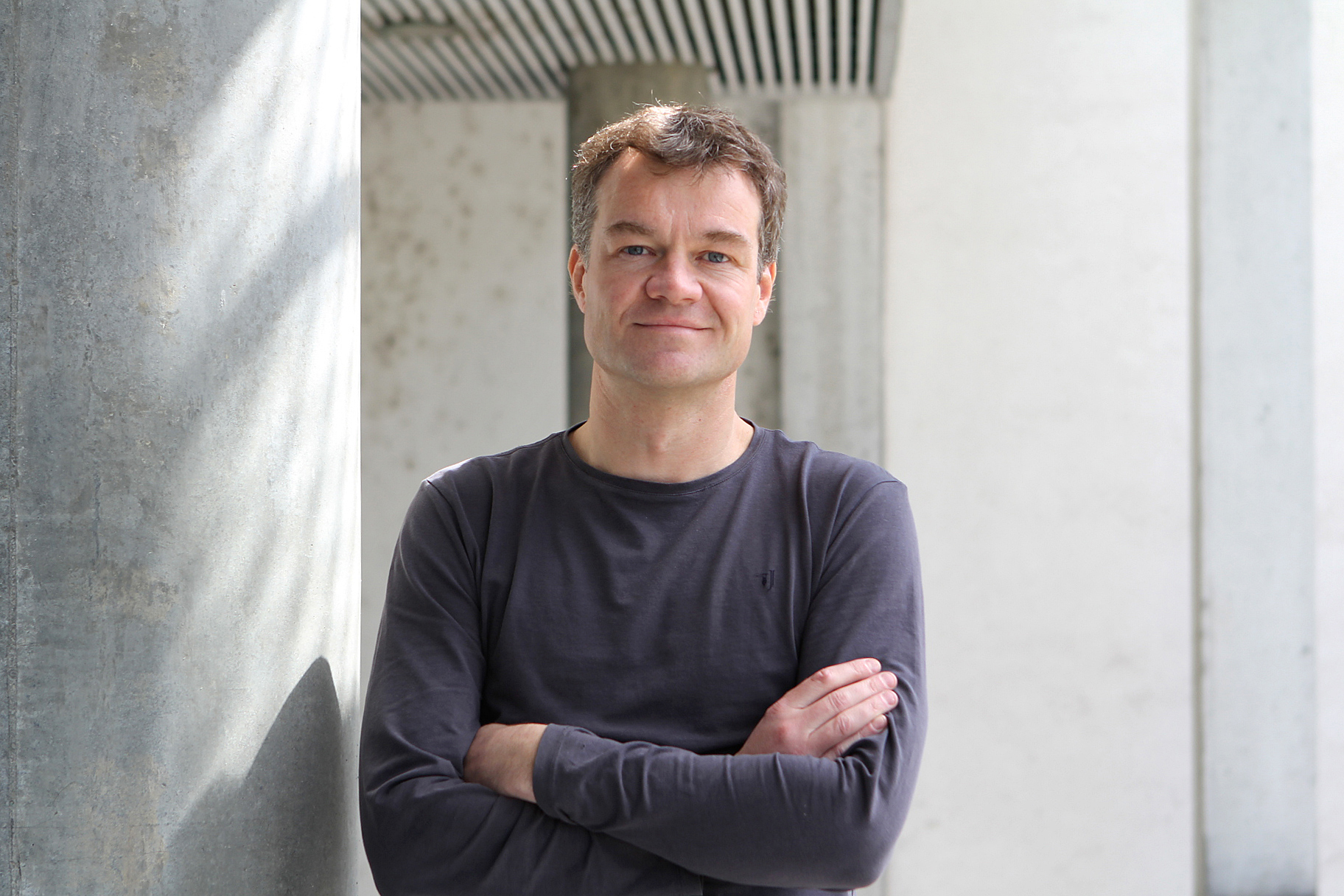
- Erik van Nimwegen (2015)
- Born: 5 November 1970 (age 55); Amsterdam
- Scientific career
- Fields: Computational Biology
- Workplaces: University of Amsterdam, Santa Fe Institute, Utrecht University, Rockefeller University, Swiss Institute of Bioinformatics, Biozentrum University of Basel

Erik van Nimwegen (born 5 November 1970 in Amsterdam, Netherlands) is a Dutch computational biologist and Professor at the Biozentrum of the University of Basel, Switzerland.

== Life ==
Erik van Nimwegen studied theoretical physics at the University of Amsterdam. He performed his PhD studies at the Santa Fe Institute (SFI) in Santa Fe New Mexico, receiving his PhD from the Faculty of Biology at Utrecht University in 1999. This was followed by a year of post-doc studies at the SFI, and three years as a fellow at the Center of Studies in Physics and Biology at the Rockefeller University, New York. Since 2003 he is Professor of Computational Biology at the Biozentrum of the University of Basel, and group leader at the Swiss Institute of Bioinformatics since 2004.

== Work ==
Erik van Nimwegen’s main research topics concern genome evolution and the function and evolution of the regulatory networks by which cells control gene expression. He develops mathematical models for analyzing how regulatory networks evolve and function, and computational methods for the reconstruction of such networks from large biological data-sets. Van Nimwegen's work includes a general model for the evolution of robustness against mutations and the identification of a number of universal scaling laws of genome evolution. Further research topics are the development of general Bayesian methods for transcription factor and miRNA binding site prediction as well as models for inferring regulatory networks from genome-wide expression and chromatin state data.

== Awards and honors ==
Since 2010 Member of the editorial board of the journal PLoS Computational Biology.
