= Ueli Aebi =

Swiss structural biologist (1946–2025)

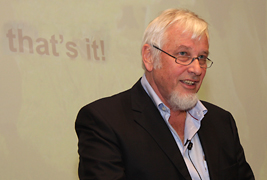
- Aebi in 2012
- Born: 31 May 1946; Bern, Switzerland
- Died: 28 November 2025 (aged 79)
- Citizenship: Swiss
- Known for: Integrative structural biology
- Scientific career
- Fields: Structural Biology
- Workplaces: University of Bern, Maurice E. Müller Institute for Structural Biology, University of Basel

Ueli Aebi (31 May 1946 – 28 November 2025) was a Swiss structural biologist and co-founder of the Maurice E. Müller Institute for Structural Biology at the Biozentrum University of Basel.

== Background ==
Aebi studied physics, mathematics, and molecular biology at the Universities of Bern and Basel from 1967 to 1974, graduating in 1977 in biophysics at the University of Basel. After establishing his academic career in the United States (University of California, Los Angeles, Johns Hopkins University School of Medicine), in 1986 he returned to the Biozentrum as professor of structural biology. He was co-founder of the Maurice E. Müller Institute for Structural Biology and its director from 1986 until reaching emeritus status in 2011. Aebi died on 28 November 2025, at the age of 79.

== Work ==
Aebi is recognised as a pioneer in integrative structural biology as well as mechano- and nanobiology. His work focused on the elucidation of the structure, function and assembly of the cyto- and nucleoskeleton and the nuclear pore complex (NPC), as well as the amyloid fibrils that are a hallmark of Alzheimer's disease. He studied the architecture of diverse supramolecular assemblies using a combination of light, electron and atomic force microscopy, X-ray crystallography, and protein engineering. Among others, Aebi determined the 3-dimensional structure of the NPC by cryo-electron tomography.

== Awards and honors ==
- 1993: Elected Member of the European Molecular Biology Organization
- 1999: Elected Member of the Academia Europaea
- 2007: Dr. honoris causa (h.c.) from the 1st Medical Faculty, Charles University, Prague, Czech Republic
- 2011: Carl Zeiss Lecture Award of the German Society for Cell Biology
- 2011: Distinguished Scientist Award of the Microscopy Society of America
