= Henning Stahlberg =

German physicist

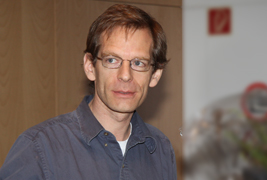
- Henning Stahlberg (2011)
- Born: November 18, 1965 (age 60); Berlin
- Scientific career
- Fields: Physicist
- Workplaces: Technische Universität Berlin, University of California, Davis, Biozentrum University of Basel, École Polytechnique Fédérale de Lausanne

Henning Stahlberg is a German physicist and Professor at the Swiss Federal Institute of Technology Lausanne and the University of Lausanne, Switzerland.

== Life ==
Henning Stahlberg studied physics at the Technische Universität Berlin and graduated with a doctorate from the Swiss Federal Institute of Technology in Lausanne (EPFL) in 1997. He continued his research as a postdoctoral fellow at the Biozentrum, University of Basel for the following 6 years. From 2003 he joined the University of California, Davis as assistant professor, where he was promoted to tenured associate professor in 2007. From 2009 to 2020, Stahlberg was a Full Professor for Structural Biology at the Biozentrum of the University of Basel, where he headed the Center for Cellular Imaging and NanoAnalytics (C-CINA). Since 2020, Stahlberg holds a dual-affiliation as a Full Professor for Physics at the Institute of Physics of the Basic Sciences division of the EPFL and as a Full Professor in the Faculty of Biology and Medicine of the University of Lausanne, Switzerland. He heads the Laboratory of Biological Microscopy at the EPFL and is establishing the Dubochet Center for Imaging in Lausanne.

== Work ==
Henning Stahlberg studies biological membrane systems from the atomic structure of individual proteins to the cellular context of the system. Employing cryo-electron microscopy, electron tomography, and correlative light and electron microscopy CLEM, he investigates the structure of ion channels and membrane transporters, and studies the molecular and cellular events in Parkinson's disease. Further, he develops computational algorithms for the 3D reconstruction of proteins. Using these methods, Stahlberg successfully elucidated among other things the 3D structure of the Type III Secretion System (T3SS) in intact bacteria. He developed the 2dx software to reconstruct the 3D structure of membrane proteins from cryo-electron microscopy images of 2D crystals, which the group merged into the FOCUS software for online data processing of cryo-EM data.

== Awards and honors ==
- 2004: NSF CAREER award, National Science Foundation, USA
- 2008: Chancellor's Fellow Award, University of California, Davis,
- 2009: W. M. Keck Award
