= Rebekka Hauri =

Swiss volleyball player and model (born 1998)

Personal information
- Born: 12 November 1998 (age 27) Bern, Switzerland
- Education: Coppin State University; Rollins College
- Height: 169 cm (5 ft 7 in)

Volleyball information
- Position: Libera
- Current team: Volley Köniz

Career
- Years: Team
- 2017-18: VBC Gerlafingen
- 2018-22: Coppin State Eagles
- 2022-23: Rollins Tars
- 2023-24: BBSC Berlin

Rebekka Hauri (born 12 November 1998) is a Swiss volleyball player and model. As of October 2025, she plays as a libera for Volley Köniz.

== Early life and education ==
Rebekka Hauri was born 12 November 1998, in Bern, Switzerland. She has two sisters.

She began playing volleyball at age 14. She attended the Hofwil Gymnasium, in the Swiss Volley Talent School.

Hauri studied biology at Coppin State University in Baltimore, Maryland. She transferred to Rollins College in Winter Park, Florida, where she studied to receive a Master of Public Health degree.

== Career ==
In 2014, while playing for Volley Köniz, Hauri and her team won the U17 Super League. Two years later, they won the U19 Super League.

Hauri played for VBC Gerlafingen for the 2017-2018 season.

While studying at Coppin State University, she played for the Coppin State Eagles (2018–2022). After transferring to Rollins College, she played for the Rollins Tars for the 2022-23 season. The team finished second in the Mid-Eastern Conference in the 2020/21 season and third in the 2021/22 season. In the following season, she joined BBSC Berlin, where the club finished third in the 2nd Bundesliga North. In the 2024/25 season, she returned to her hometown to play for Volley Köniz in the National League B.

== Personal life ==
Hauri speaks German, English, and Spanish.

She is a Christian.
