= Markus Affolter =

Developmental Biologist

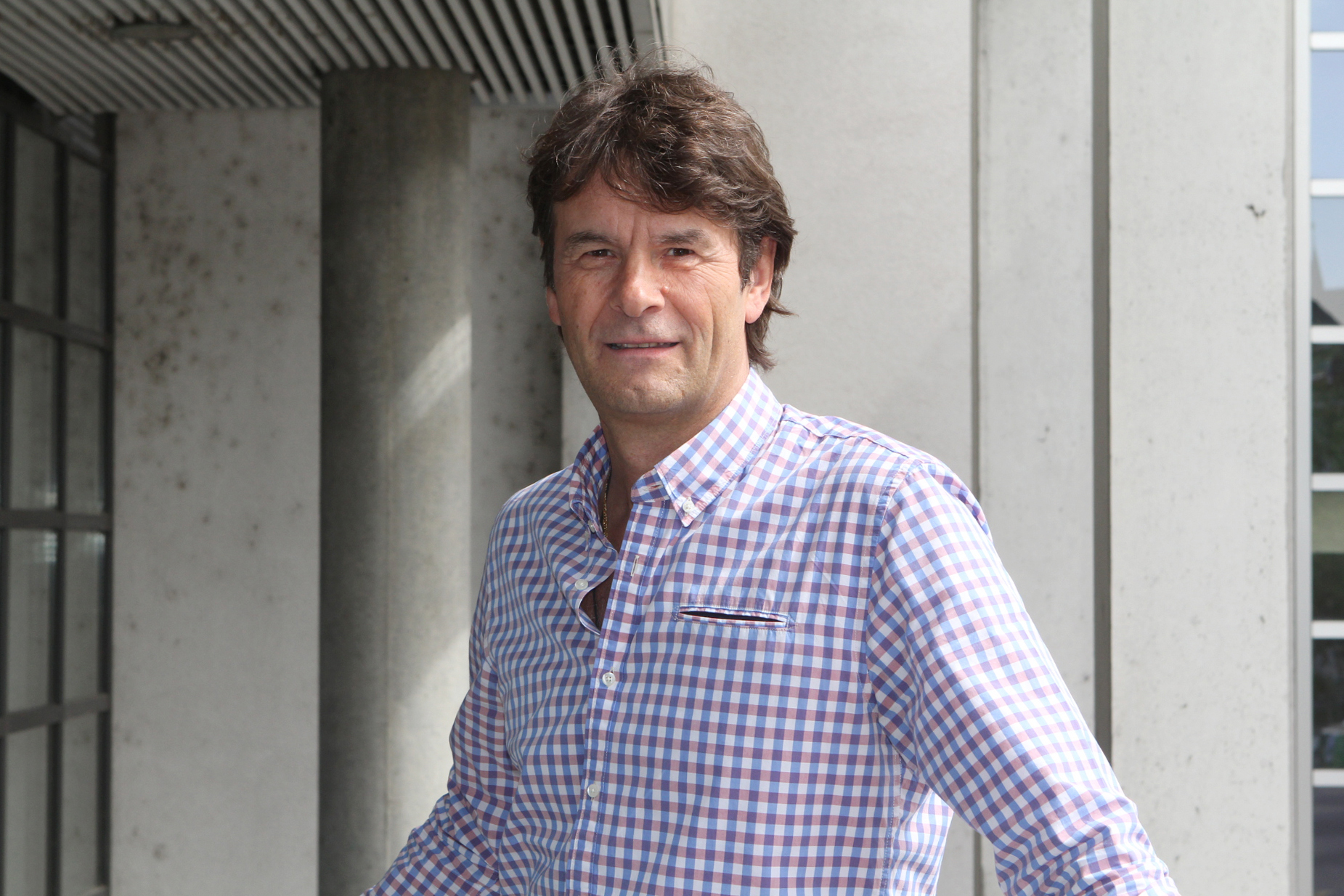
- Markus Affolter (2015)
- Born: 3 June 1958 (age 68); Seeberg BE
- Awards: K.M. Hunter Award from the National Cancer Institute of Canada (1983); Elected Member of the European Molecular Biology Organization (EMBO) (1999); Elected Member of the German National Academy of Sciences Leopoldina (EMBO) (2008)
- Scientific career
- Fields: Developmental Biologist
- Workplaces: ETH Zurich, Laval University, Biozentrum University of Basel

Markus Affolter (born 3 June 1958, in Seeberg BE) is a Swiss Developmental Biologist and professor emeritus. He conducted research at the Biozentrum University of Basel, Switzerland.

== Life ==
Markus Affolter studied Biology at the ETH Zurich and at Laval University in Quebec City, Canada. Following his PhD from Laval University in 1988, he worked as a postdoctoral fellow at the Biozentrum, University of Basel. In the laboratory of Professor Walter Gehring, Markus Affolter began his research with the fruit fly Drosophila melanogaster. In 2000, he became an assistant professor and from 2005 to 2025 he was professor of developmental biology at the Biozentrum of the University of Basel.

== Work ==
Affolter researches the cellular and molecular processes involved in the formation of organs and blood vessel networks in the fruit fly Drosophila melanogaster and zebrafish. He has extensively used live-imaging, high-resolution microscopy in studying network formation in these animals, work which has enabled the better understanding of the function of molecules in morphogenesis. His lab has shown, in collaboration with the University of Freiburg, Germany and the University of Lausanne, that the morphogen Dpp and the feedback regulator Pentagone have key functions in proportional tissue growth (scaling) in the wing disc of the fruit fly. In addition to biological questions, a major focus of his research was the development of new methods. His laboratory developed nanobody-based tools to investigate protein function and localization in developing organisms, as well as the SEED/Harvest method, an innovative CRISPR/Cas9-based technique for efficient protein labeling.

== Awards and honors ==
- 1983: K.M. Hunter Award from the National Cancer Institute of Canada
- 1999: Elected member of the European Molecular Biology Organization (EMBO)
- 2008: Elected member of the German National Academy of Sciences Leopoldina

== Video links ==
- "The Dawn of Life" Cells into organs.
- University of Basel, Interview Prof. Dr. Markus Affolter
