= Joachim Seelig =

German physical chemist (1942–2024)

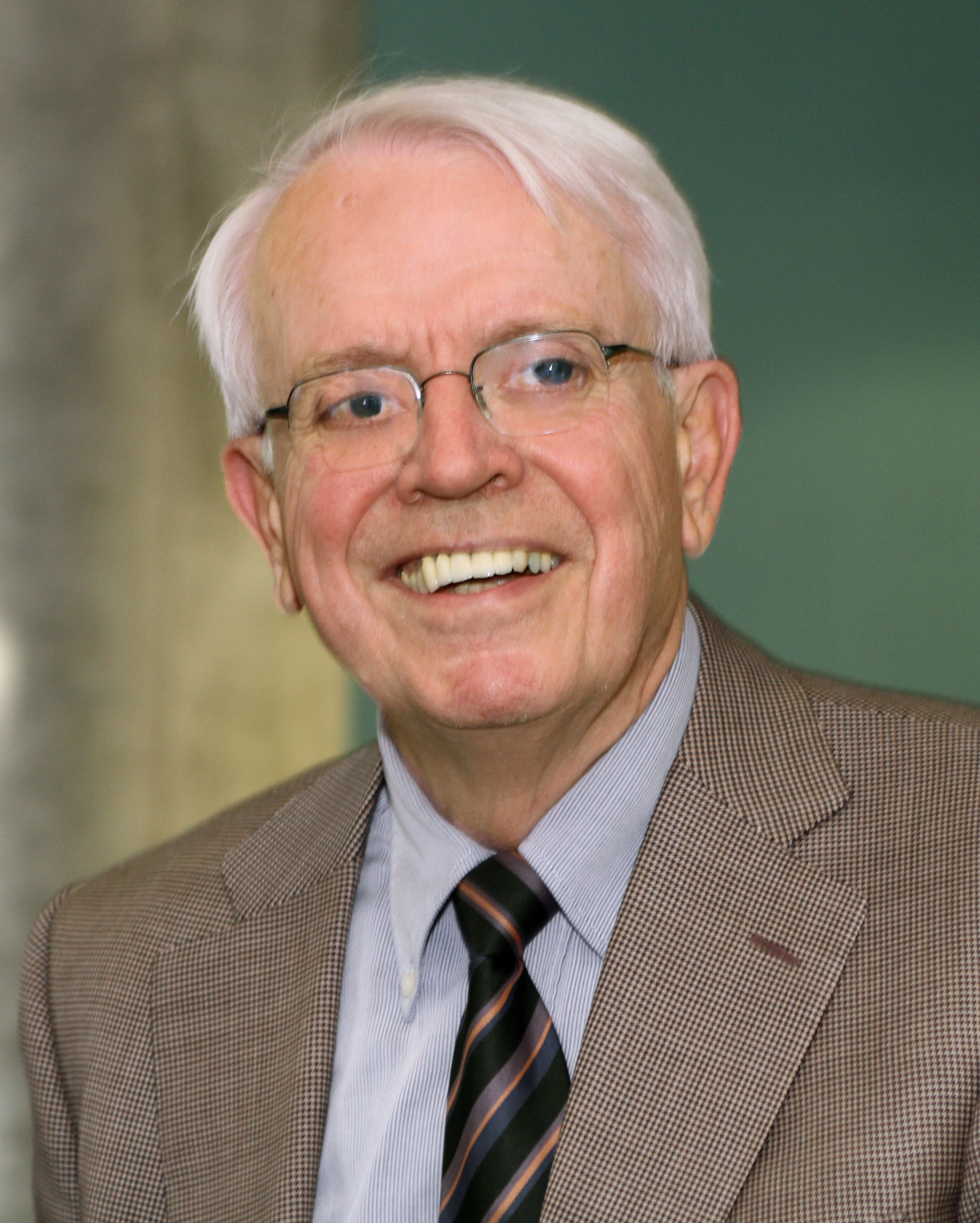
- Seelig in 2012
- Born: 29 March 1942; Cologne, Gau Cologne-Aachen, Germany
- Died: 15 August 2024 (aged 82); Basel, Switzerland
- Scientific career
- Fields: Physical chemist
- Workplaces: University of Cologne, Biozentrum University of Basel

Joachim Heinrich Seelig (29 March 1942 – 15 August 2024) was a German and Swiss physical chemist and specialist in NMR Spectroscopy. He was one of the founding fathers of the Biozentrum of the University of Basel. He reached emeritus status in 2012.

== Background ==
Joachim Seelig was born in Cologne on 29 March 1942. He studied chemistry and physics from 1961 till 1966 at the University of Cologne. In 1968 he graduated with a doctorate under the guidance of Manfred Eigen at the Max Planck Institute for Biophysical Chemistry in Göttingen. As a postdoc he conducted research on electron spin resonance at Stanford University in 1968/69. In 1970 he moved as a postdoc to the Institute of Physical Chemistry at the University of Basel where he became a group leader and assistant professor in 1972. He became full professor in 1974 and in 1982 Professor of Structural Biology at the Biozentrum of the University of Basel.

Seelig died in Basel, Switzerland on 15 August 2024, at the age of 82.

== Work ==
Joachim Seelig developed biophysical methods for studying the structure and thermodynamic properties of biological cell membranes. He investigated the interactions of proteins and lipids by EPR-spectroscopy, deuterium and phosphorus nuclear magnetic resonance, neutron diffraction and calorimetric methods. The quantitative characterization of the biological membrane became the international standard for further theoretical studies. His second field of research was magnetic resonance imaging (MRI) and magnetic resonance spectroscopy (MRS) in the humans and animals. With C-13 NMR the metabolism in the human and animal brain could be traced in a non-invasive manner. With faster MRI imaging techniques the tonotopy of the human brain has been described.

== Awards and honors ==
- 1987 Cloëtta Prize, Prof. Cloëtta Foundation, Zurich
- 1991 Bijvoet Medal of the Bijvoet Center for Biomolecular Research, Utrecht University, NL
- 1994 Heinrich Wieland Prize, Munich
- 2000 Applied Physical Chemistry Award 2000, European Society for applied Physical Chemistry
- 2003 Foreign membership of the Royal Netherlands Academy of Arts and Sciences
- 2005 Avanti Award in Lipids, Biophysical Society (USA)
