= Stahlberg =

- Municipality
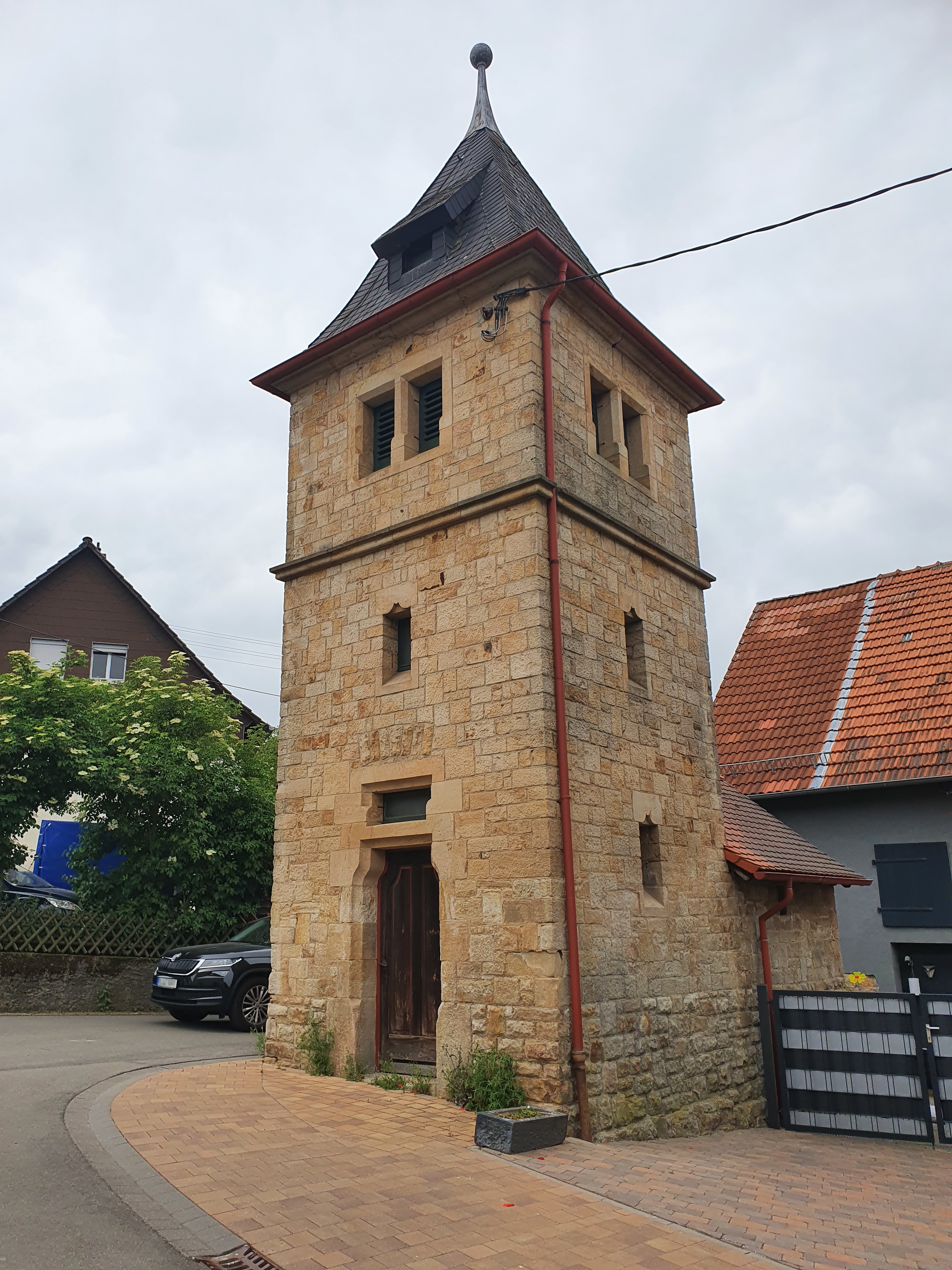
- bell tower

- Coat of arms

- Location of Stahlberg within Donnersbergkreis district
- Interactive map of Stahlberg
- Location within Germany Location within Rhineland-Palatinate
- Coordinates: 49°40′0″N 7°47′16″E
- Country: Germany
- State: Rhineland-Palatinate
- District: Donnersbergkreis
- Municipal assoc.: Nordpfälzer Land

Government
  - Mayor (2019–24): Bernd Wirth

Area
  - Total: 2.59 km^{2} (1.00 sq mi)
- Elevation: 403 m (1,322 ft)

Population (2025-12-31)
  - Total: 166
  - Density: 64.1/km^{2} (166/sq mi)
- Time zone: UTC+01:00 (CET)
  - Summer (DST): UTC+02:00 (CEST)
- Postal codes: 67808
- Dialling codes: 06361
- Vehicle registration: KIB

Stahlberg (German pronunciation: [ˈʃtaːlbɛʁk]) is a municipality in the Donnersbergkreis district, in Rhineland-Palatinate, Germany.
