= Félicie Affolter =

Swiss psychotherapist and psychologist (1926–2024)

Félicie Affolter (22 February 1926 – 5 November 2024) was a Swiss psychologist, psychotherapist, speech therapist, and teacher of the deaf.

== Early life and career ==
Félicie Affolter was born in St. Gallen on 22 February 1926. She studied psychology after training as a speech therapist (psychology), including under Jean Piaget at the University of Geneva. She received her doctorate in speech therapy from the University of Minnesota in 1959 and then worked at the Pedaudiology. In 1976, she established a foundation there for the research and treatment of perceptual disorders (for example with autism) together with a Förderschule. She has taught at universities and clinical institutions in Europe and the USA.

== Affolter model ==
During her many years of clinical work with children and adults with perceptual disorders, she developed her own developmental model and therapy concept, the Affolter Model, also known as "Sensed Interaction Therapy". In this model, actions that cannot be performed by patients with perceptual problems are carried out together with the therapist. The basic idea was that sensory interaction in everyday life provides the infant with their first experiences of the world; if these could not be stored sufficiently or effectively, further disorders of perception and language acquisition and other cognitive as well as social performance can result; therapy for these must therefore start again with sensory perception.

This therapy enables patients to learn in a practical and everyday way. If perception is impaired, targeted guiding with the hands and body during everyday events can help to improve the search for information. Guiding means that another person performs actions with the patient's body in such a way that relationships are established between the patient and the environment. These guided interaction experiences promote motor skills, cognitive and emotional performance.

Working according to Affolter is now one of the most important therapeutic approaches in working with patients with severe perceptual disorders.

For the treatment of people with dementia, occupational therapist Gudrun Schaade has adapted the Affolter model to the needs of those affected and integrated it into the support concept she has developed.

== Death ==
Affolter died on 5 November 2024, in Disentis/Muster, Switzerland at the age of 98.

== Awards ==
In 2008, the Center for Cognitive Sciences at the University of Minnesota awarded Félicie Affolter the Distinguished Leadership Award for Internationals for her life's work.

== Publications (selection) ==
- Wahrnehmung, Wirklichkeit und Sprache, Neckar-Verlag, Villingen-Schwenningen 2007 (10th unchanged edition; first edition 1987), ISBN 978-3-7883-0255-9
  - Perception, interaction and language. Interaction of daily living. The root of development, Springer Verlag, Berlin 1991, ISBN 3-540-51150-4
- Nichtsprachliches Lösen von Problemen in Alltagssituationen bei normalen Kindern und Kindern mit Sprachstörungen (= Wissenschaftliche Beiträge aus Forschung, Lehre und Praxis zur Rehabilitation von Menschen mit Behinderungen, Band 51), Neckar-Verlag, Villingen-Schwenningen 2007, ISBN 978-3-7883-0293-1
- with Walter Bischofberger: Gespürtes Wirken in der Wirklichkeit, Neckar-Verlag, Villingen-Schwenningen 2013, ISBN 978-3-7883-1226-8

== Literature ==
- Heike Ackermann: Das Konzept von Félicie Affolter und seine Bedeutung für die Geistigbehindertenpädagogik. Edition SZH, Lucerne 2001, ISBN 3-908262-03-8
- Adrian Hofer, Walter Ehwald: The Affolter Model. Developmental model and sensed interaction therapy. Pflaum, Munich 2009, ISBN 978-3-7905-0977-9
