= Urs A. Meyer =

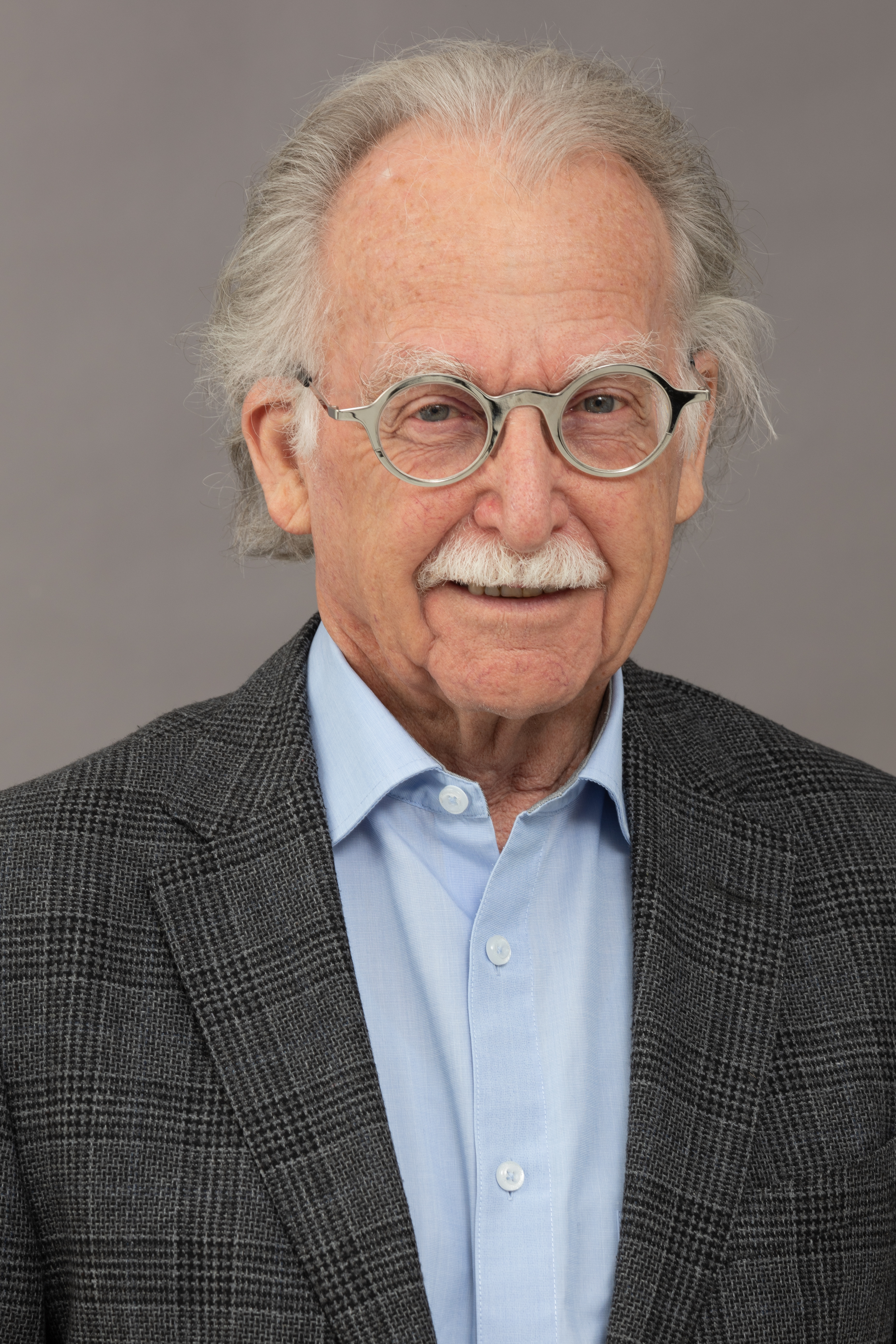
- Urs A. Meyer (2020)
- Scientific career
- Fields: Clinical pharmacology, pharmacogenomics, personalized medicine
- Workplaces: University of Zurich, University of California, San Francisco, University Hospital of Zurich, Biozentrum University of Basel

Urs Albert Meyer is a Swiss physician-scientist and clinical pharmacologist.

== Life ==
Meyer is professor emeritus of pharmacology at the Biozentrum University of Basel. After clinical and research training at the University of California, San Francisco, USA, he worked as assistant professor in clinical pharmacology at the same institution. In 1974, he became Head of Clinical Pharmacology at the University Hospital of Zurich. From 1983 to 2008, Meyer carried out research and taught as professor of pharmacology at the Biozentrum University of Basel, where he also acted as Chairman. He has served in various World Health Organization and National Institutes of Health functions and was president of the Clinical Section of the Swiss National Science Foundation.

== Work ==
The research of Urs A. Meyer explored the pharmacogenomic and environmental mechanisms that cause interindividual variability in drug response. In his postdoctoral work, he described the molecular defect in heme synthesis causing hepatic porphyrias. He and his coworkers later made the first transgenic mouse model of this disease and elucidated the drug sensitivity of patients with porphyria. Meyer's laboratory received international acclaim through the discovery of the molecular mechanism of two common genetic polymorphisms of drug metabolism which cause a variable clinical response to numerous drugs. His team identified the genes and mutations for the enzyme cytochrome P450 CYP2D6 and for N-acetyltransferase 2 and developed the first pharmacogenetic DNA tests. Furthermore, Meyer contributed to the molecular mechanism by which certain drugs activate nuclear receptors and thereby regulate the expression of drug metabolizing enzymes and drug transporters. These predictable variations in drug response allow actionable clinical decisions for drug choice and drug dose and are important components of personalized medicine and precision medicine.

== Awards and honors ==
- 1971–1974: Faculty Development Award in Clinical Pharmacology by the Pharmaceutical Manufacturers Association Foundation
- 1974: Cloëtta Prize
- 1978: Award of the Anita Saurer Foundation
- 1991: Rawls-Palmer Award for Progress in Medicine of the American Society of Clinical Pharmacology and Therapeutics
- 2004: Robert Pfleger Research Award
- 2004: R.T. Williams Distinguished Scientific Achievement Award of the International Society for the Study of Xenobiotics
- 2010–2011: President, International Society for the Study of Xenobiotics (ISSX)
- 2019: Lifetime Achievement Award of the European Association of Clinical Pharmacology and Therapeutics
