= Maurice Edmond Müller =

Swiss orthopedic surgeon

Maurice Edmond Müller (28 March 1918 – 10 May 2009) was a Swiss orthopedic surgeon who was instrumental in the development of internal fixation techniques to treat bone fractures and who also significantly advanced the development of the hip prostheses. For his work in these areas he has been honored with numerous awards. On 24 August 2002, the International Society of Orthopaedic Surgery and Traumatology (SICOT) named him the "Orthopedic Surgeon of the Century" at a congress in San Diego.

Müller was also the patron who founded the Zentrum Paul Klee in Bern, Switzerland.

== Early life and education ==
Müller was born in Biel, Switzerland, where he also went to school. He studied medicine at the universities of Neuchâtel, Bern, and Lausanne and received his M.D. from the University of Zürich in 1946. In 1944, he was visited by a patient who had a bone fracture treated in World War II by the German surgeon Gerhard Küntscher, who had fixed the fracture using an implanted nail. This and another visit by a patient who had a hip implant made in Paris determined Müller to specialize in this area.

== Career ==
After having worked in Jimma in Ethiopia, in Liestal, in Fribourg, and in Zürich, Müller habilitated in orthopedic surgery in 1957. From 1960 on he led the department of orthopedics and traumatology at the hospital of St. Gallen. From 1963 to 1980 he was professor at the University of Bern and head of orthopedic surgery at the Inselspital in Bern.

In 1958, Müller co-founded the Arbeitsgemeinschaft für Osteosynthesefragen. Inspired by the work of Belgian surgeon Robert Danis, Müller developed within two years new tools and fixation implants for orthopedic surgery, marketed by two Swiss companies and from the mid-1970 on also by Synthes USA. Since 2004, all three companies are part of the Synthes Holding AG.

In 1967, Müller founded another company, Protek AG, to market his hip prostheses, which he had developed in the early 1960s, inspired by the work of John Charnley. From 1974 on, profits went to the Maurice E. Müller foundation, the first of several foundations Müller founded to advance the education and research in orthopedic surgery. In 1990, the company was sold to Sulzer Medica (which since then has become an independent spin-off from the Sulzer mother company and which later became part of Zimmer, Inc. under the name of Centerpulse).

== Zentrum Paul Klee ==
Müller was also the patron who founded the Zentrum Paul Klee in Bern, Switzerland. He developed the initial ideas for the museum, contacted architect Renzo Piano for its realization, and donated through a foundation formed for this purpose 70 million Swiss francs (more than half of the total cost of CHF 125 million) for the construction of the museum.

Müller died on 10 May 2009 in Bern.

== Works ==
- M. E. Müller et al.: Manual of Internal Fixation, AO-ASIF, 1980. ISBN 3-540-52523-8 (3rd ed., 1995).
- M. E. Müller et al.: The Comprehensive Classification of Fractures of Long Bones, Springer 1994. ISBN 3-540-18165-2.
