= Coronin =

Protein

Coronin is an actin binding protein which also interacts with microtubules and in some cell types is associated with phagocytosis. Coronin proteins are expressed in a large number of eukaryotic organisms from yeast to humans.

== Discovery ==
Initially, a 55 kDa protein was isolated from the actomyosin complex of Dictyostelium discoideum, which was later shown to bind actin in vitro. This actin binding protein was named coronin after its strong immunolocalisation in the actin rich crown like extension of the cell cortex in D. discoideum. Initially this protein was admitted into club of actin binding proteins with least enthusiasm, as the primary structure did not match any other ABPs. But null mutation of coronin in D. discoideum resulted in impaired cytokinesis, and many actin mediated processes like endocytosis, cell motility etc. Later on, the protein was identified in many eukaryotic cells.

== Structure ==
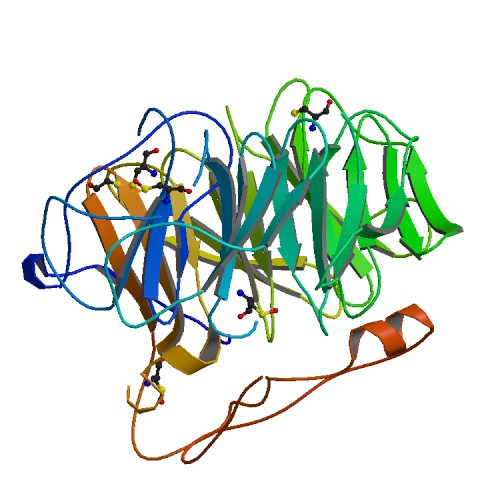
Crystal structure of mouse coronin-1.

Coronin belongs to the WD-repeat containing proteins, which form a beta propeller tertiary structure. The crystal structure of coronin 1A (see figure to the right) containing major part of the protein was solved in 2006.

The WD-repeat is a structural motif comprising approximately 40 amino acids usually ending with the amino acid sequence tryptophan (W) – aspartic acid (D) and hence the name WD.

WD-40-domain –repeat proteins are defined by the presence of at least four WD repeats located centrally in the protein. These domains were discovered in 1986 and are characterized by a partial conserved domain of 40-60 amino acids, starting with GH dipeptide 11-24 residue away from the N-terminus and ending with a tryptophane-aspartic acid (WD) dipeptide at the C-terminus. The WD domain has no intrinsic catalytic activity and is thought to serve as a stable platform for simultaneous interaction. WD repeat proteins have diverse cellular functions. They play a central role in physiological processes like signal transduction, transcriptional regulation, cytoskeleton remodeling, and regulation of vesicle trafficking.

Coronin homologues both in vertebrates and invertebrates forms a subfamily among WD repeat proteins. Coronin contains 3-5 WD clustered repeats forming the central core domain. Apart from the core domain, almost all coronins have a short conserved N-terminal motif and coiled coil motif of 50 amino acids at the C-terminus. The N-terminal region contains 12 basic amino acids which can be taken as signature as it is present in only coronin proteins. These basic residues have been shown to be involved in actin binding. Furthermore, each coronin contains a unique divergent region between the WD domain and C-terminal coiled coil region. The number of amino acids in this region varies greatly. The unique region of Dictyostelium has 22 amino acids whereas mammalian coronins contains about 50 amino acids. The coronin-like proteins from budding yeast Crn1 and one of the coronins in Caenorhabditis elegans has a much longer unique region i.e. 194 vs 144aa. The unique region of yeast coronin shows homologies with microtubule binding domains of the MAPs and yeast coronin binds both actin and microtubule and serve as bridge between them.

A second region of variability exists in the fourth β-strand of the third WD repeats.

== Function ==
Yeast coronin Crn1 and Drosophila Dpod1 were found to crosslink the actin and microtubule cytoskeleton. Caenorhabditis elegans POD-1 and Drosophila coronin homologue regulate the actin cytoskeleton and are involved in vesicular trafficking.

Seven different isoforms of coronin have been reported in mammals. The most well-studied isoforms are coronin 1 (Coronin 1A) and coronin 1B. Coronin 1 exerted an inhibitory effect on cellular steady-state F-actin formation via an Arp2/3-dependent mechanism. Whereas coronin 1 was required for chemokine-mediated migration, it was dispensable for T cell antigen receptor functions in T cells. Coronin 1B is required for efficient cell protrusion and migration. Coronin 1B inhibits the Arp2/3 complex activity by replacing it at the branched actin structure. Mammalian Coronin-7 does not interact with actin nor does it execute any actin mediated processes, but rather participates in Golgi trafficking.

Although coronin is present in almost all eukaryotic organisms and has different functions, these proteins have all been shown to bind F-actin and localize in the dynamic F-actin rich area of cells. Coronin binds to ATP/ADP-Pi containing F-actin with much greater affinity compared to ADP containing F-actin, which might explain their unique cellular localization.

== Classification ==
- Short conventional coronins. Contain 450-650 amino acids with C-terminus coiled coil region of 30-40 amino acids that mediates homophilic dimerization and/or oligomerization of coronins (e.g., CRN1, CRN2).
- Long coronins. Two core domains with no C-terminal coiled coil region.

N-terminus signature region is reduced to 5aa and appears in front of each WD-repeat core domain (e.g., CRN7, POD-1)

== Family members ==
Human proteins which are members of the coronin family include:

- CORO1A
- CORO1B
- CORO1C
- CORO2A
- CORO2B
- CORO6
- CORO7
