= CORO6 =

Protein-coding gene in the species Homo sapiens

Identifiers
- Aliases: CORO6, coronin 6
- External IDs: MGI: 2183448; GeneCards: CORO6

Gene location (Human)
Chr.	Chromosome 17 (human)
Band	17q11.2	Start	29,614,756 bp
Band	17q11.2	End	29,622,907 bp

Gene location (Mouse)
Chr.	Chromosome 11 (mouse)
Band	11|11 B5	Start	77,353,237 bp
Band	11|11 B5	End	77,361,310 bp
RNA expression pattern
Bgee	Human / Mouse (ortholog); Top expressed in: gastrocnemius muscle; muscle of thigh; gastric mucosa; apex of heart; Skeletal muscle tissue of rectus abdominis; left lobe of thyroid gland; right auricle of heart; right lobe of thyroid gland; quadriceps femoris muscle; vastus lateralis muscle / Top expressed in: interventricular septum; soleus muscle; muscle of thigh; extraocular muscle; digastric muscle; myocardium of ventricle; right ventricle; cardiac muscles; sternocleidomastoid muscle; intercostal muscle; More reference expression data
BioGPS	n/a
Gene ontology
Molecular function	actin filament binding; protein binding
Cellular component	actin cytoskeleton
Biological process	actin cytoskeleton organization; actin filament organization; cell migration
Sources:Amigo / QuickGO
Orthologs
Databases	NCBI: entry; OMA: entry
Species	Human	Mouse
Entrez	84940	216961
Ensembl	ENSG00000167549	ENSMUSG00000020836
UniProt	Q6QEF8	Q920M5
RefSeq (mRNA)	NM_032854; NM_001351301; NM_001351302	NM_139128; NM_139129; NM_139130; NM_001368670
RefSeq (protein)	NP_116243; NP_001338230; NP_001338231	NP_624354; NP_624355; NP_624356; NP_001355599
Location (UCSC)	Chr 17: 29.61 – 29.62 Mb	Chr 11: 77.35 – 77.36 Mb
PubMed search
- Wikidata
View/Edit Human	View/Edit Mouse

Coronin-6 also known as coronin-like protein E (Clipin-E) is a protein that in humans is encoded by the CORO6 gene.

Coronin-6 belongs to the coronin family which is an actin binding protein. Human CORO6 gene is located on chromosome 17 on the cytogenetic band 17 p11.2. Gene CORO6 is well conserved across domain of eukaryote organisms from fungus to animal.

== Expression ==
=== EST profile ===
Based on the EST profile, CORO6 expressed in high level at the larynx, nerve and muscle. CORO6 has also been shown to be expressed in high levels in the breast (mammary gland) tumor. During the human development stage, the higher level of CORO6 expressed at blastocyst and adult.

=== Transcript Variant ===
Alternative mRNAs are shown aligned from 5' to 3' on a virtual genome where introns have been shrunk to a minimal length. Exon size is proportional to length, intron height reflects the number of cDNAs supporting each intron. Introns of the same color are identical, of different colors are different. 'Good proteins' are pink, partial or not-good proteins are yellow, uORFs are green. 5' cap or3' poly A flags show completeness of the transcript . CORO6 contains 21 distinct gt-ag introns. Transcription produces 10 alternatively spliced mRNA. There are 3 probable alternative promoters, and validated alternative polyadenylation sites.

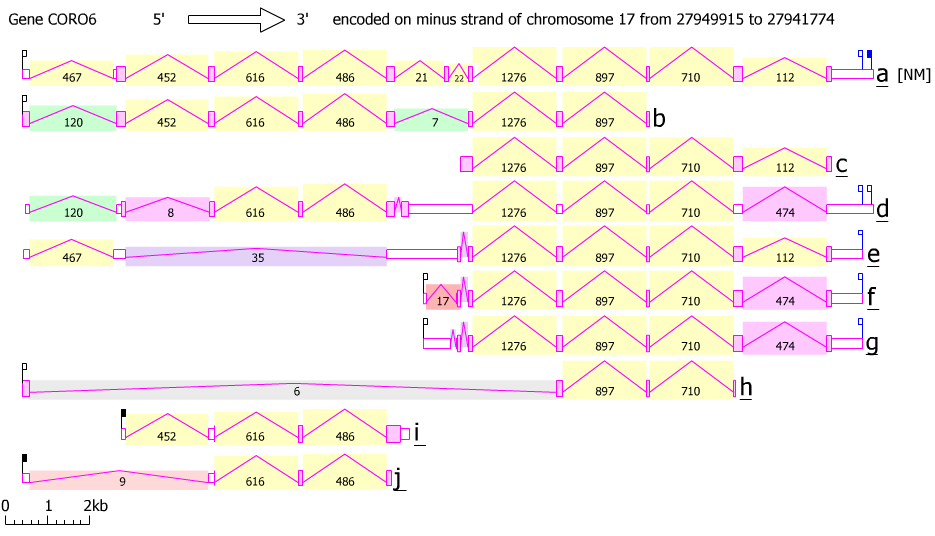

== Structure ==
CORO6 protein sequence contains WD-40 repeats. WD40 domain is a structural motif found in Eukaryotes and cover variety of functions, such as adaptor or regulatory modules in signal transduction, pre-mRNA processing and cytoskeletal assembly. It usually terminating at WD dipeptide at its C-terminus and is about 40 residues long, so called WD40.

The structure of CORO6 is predicted by using Phyre2 program. It is similar to the crystal structure of murine coronin-1. 390 residues ( 83% of CORO6 protein sequence) have been modelled with 100.0% confidence by the single highest scoring template. Image coloured by rainbow N → C terminus

== Homology ==
=== Paralogs ===
Human proteins which are the paralogs to CORO6, CORO1A, CORO1B, CORO1C, CORO2A, CORO2B, CORO7

The table compared Homo sapiens protein CORO6 to its paralogs

Name of paralogs	CORO6	CORO1A	CORO1B	CORO2A	CORO2B	CORO7
Accession number	NP_116243	NP_009005	NP_065174	NP_438171	NP_006082	NP_078811
Sequence length	472 aa	461 aa	489 aa	525 aa	480 aa	925 aa
Sequence identity		67%	67%	45%	45%	32%
Sequence similarity		81%	80%	64%	63%	49%

By comparing its paralogs we found that CORO1A and CORO1B are most related to CORO6.

=== Orthologs ===
CORO6 is highly conserved throughout the organisms from vertebrate to fungus, the organisms listed in the table are some representatives.

Genus and species (Orthologs comparison)	Homo sapiens	Pan troglodytes	Canis familiaris	Anolis carolinensis	Danio rerio	Saccharomyces cerevisiae	Plasmodium falciparum
Common name	Human	Chimpanzee	Dog	Lizard	Zebrafish	Baker's Yeast	Malaria parasite
Date of divergence from human lineage		6.3 MYA	94.2 MYA	269 MYA	400.1 MYA	1215.8 MYA	1381.2 MYA
Accession number	NP_116243	XP_001137660	XP_548302	XP_0003227217	NP_956690	NP_013533	XP_001350896
Sequence length	472 aa	471 aa	472 aa	471 aa	436 aa	651 aa	602 aa
Sequence identity to human		96%	98%	83%	78%	42%	31%
Sequence similarity to human		97%	99%	90%	90%	62%	52%

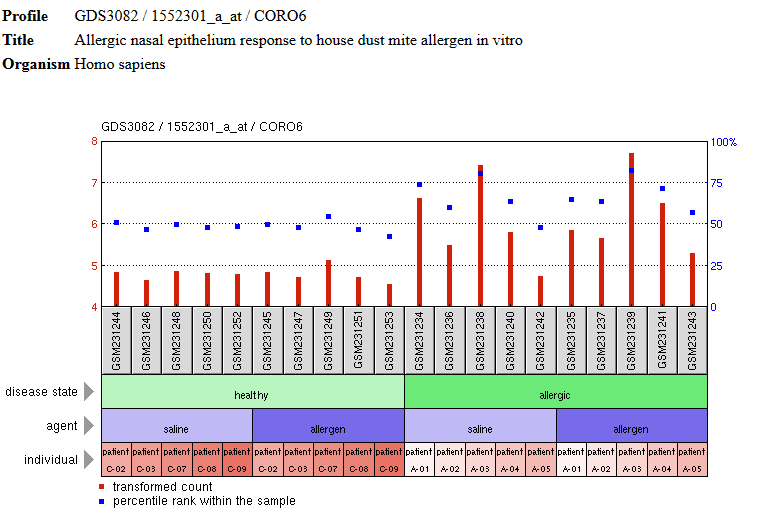

== Clinical significance ==
There are several clinical studies about that have been performed by using microarray indicating that CORO6 is positively related to allergic nasal epithelium response to house dust mite allergen in vitro.
