= Ivan Lefkovits =

Czechoslovak-born Swiss immunologist (born 1937)

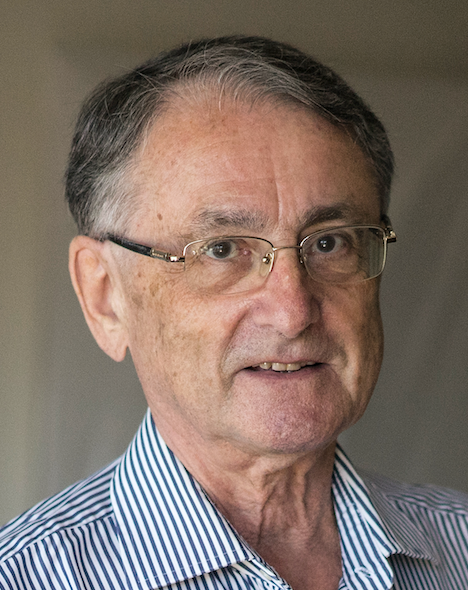
- Ivan Lefkovits (2018)
- Born: January 21, 1937; Prešov
- Citizenship: Swiss
- Education: Chemistry
- Alma mater: University of Chemistry and Technology, Prague
- Known for: Limiting dilution analysis in immunology; microculture systems; clonal analysis of B lymphocytes, proteomics of immune cells
- Awards: Golden Reiman Medal (1992), G. J. Mendel Medal (1995), Purkyně Medal (2000), Honorary doctorate University of Prešov (2007)
- Scientific career
- Fields: Immunology, Molecular Biology, Proteomics
- Institutions: Basel Institute for Immunology, University Hospital of Basel, Marburg University
- Thesis: (1967)
- Doctoral advisor: Niels Kaj Jerne

Ivan Lefkovits (born 21 January 1937 in Prešov) is a Czechoslovak-born Swiss immunologist and a founding member of the Basel Institute for Immunology.

== Life ==
In 1944, Lefkovits was deported with his older brother Paul and his mother to Ravensbrück. Paul was killed there during the “Mitwerda” action, while Ivan and his mother were transferred to Bergen-Belsen. They were liberated in 1945 by the British Army. The rest of the Lefkovits family perished in the Holocaust.

From 1956 to 1961 he studied chemistry at the University of Chemistry and Technology, Prague. After study at the Institute of Microbiology of the Czechoslovak Academy of Sciences and a two-year research stay (1965–1967) at the Laboratorio Internazionale di Genetica e Biofisica (LIGB) in Naples, he received his PhD in molecular biology in 1967. That year he emigrated to Germany, where at the Paul-Ehrlich-Institut under Niels Kaj Jerne he headed the basic research group in immunology.

In 1969 he was tasked with establishing the Basel Institute for Immunology (BII) and became one of its founding members. He worked at the institute until its closure in 2001, playing a central role in its scientific development, organization, and international character. Thereafter, until 2012, he led the proteomics working group in the Department of Biomedicine at the University Hospital of Basel.

Lefkovits was assistant professor (1979) and professor (1989–2001) at Philipps University of Marburg and a visiting professor at the Sir William Dunn School of Pathology, University of Oxford (1977), at Necker–Enfants Malades Hospital (Paris) (1999), at Erasmus University Rotterdam (2002), and at the Trudeau Institute, Saranac Lake, New York (2004).

From 1991 to 1994 he taught immunology courses at Charles University and at the Czechoslovak Academy of Sciences, as well as at the Central European Summer School of Immunology in Pieštany, České Budějovice, Košice and Prague.

== Work ==
At the LIGB, Lefkovits studied ribosomal proteins and “chloramphenicol particles,” as well as the conditions for reconstituting functional ribosomes. He subsequently established a microculture system based on the in vitro Mishell–Dutton culture in immunology.

At the Basel Institute for Immunology he first adapted the microculture system to the new method of limiting dilution analysis (LDA). He then investigated the function of B lymphocytes, their clonal proliferation, and the frequency of precursor cells during the induction of antibody formation.

He went on to develop proteomics methods to analyze intracellular mechanisms of immune competence. In his last ten years at the Basel Institute for Immunology, Lefkovits investigated the development of lymphocyte cDNA libraries, ordered libraries, and their cell-free protein-synthesis profiles. In collaboration with cardiac surgery at University Hospital Basel, he conducted proteomic studies of cardiac muscle proteins.

As a Holocaust survivor, Lefkovits has contributed to educational and historical initiatives related to the Second World War. From 1995 to 2011 he served on the board of the “Kontaktstelle für Überlebende des Holocaust in der Schweiz” (Contact Point for Holocaust Survivors in Switzerland). He initiated a memoir collection funded by the Swiss Confederation, Mit meiner Vergangenheit lebe ich (2016), in which 15 Holocaust survivors recount their lives during and after National Socialism. The title pages of the collection and its individual chapters were designed by Gerhard Richter. These are excerpts from the four paintings of his monumental cycle Birkenau, exhibited in the Reichstag building in Berlin. Lefkovits is a member of the accompanying commission group of the intergovernmental Holocaust Remembrance Alliance (IHRA), to which Switzerland has belonged since 2004. He does educational outreach through eyewitness talks at CVJM youth summer camps on the grounds of the former Bergen-Belsen concentration camp and at the Anne Frank House in Oldau, as well as in various schools, gymnasiums, universities, institutes, associations and communities in Switzerland, Germany and the Czech Republic.

== Selected publications ==
- Lefkovits, Ivan (August 1972). "Induction of antibody-forming cell clones in microcultures". European Journal of Immunology. 2 (4): 360–366. doi:10.1002/eji.1830020412. PMID 4563349.
- Lefkovits, Ivan (1974). "Precommitment in the immune system". Current Topics in Microbiology and Immunology. Vol. 65. Springer. pp. 21–58. doi:10.1007/978-3-642-65875-4_2.
- Lefkovits, Ivan; Quintáns, José R.; Munro, Alan J.; Waldmann, Herman (June 1975). "T cell-dependent mediator and B-cell clones". Immunology. 28 (6): 1149–1154. PMID 1093973.
- Lefkovits, Ivan; Waldmann, Herman (1979). Limiting Dilution Analysis of Cells in the Immune System. Cambridge: Cambridge University Press. ISBN 978-0-521-22771-1.
- Lefkovits, Ivan; Pernis, Benvenuto, eds. (1979). Immunological Methods. Vol. 1. New York: Academic Press. ISBN 978-0-12-442750-1.
- Lefkovits, Ivan; Pernis, Benvenuto, eds. (1981). Immunological Methods. Vol. 2. New York: Academic Press. ISBN 978-0-12-442702-0.
- Lefkovits, Ivan; Pernis, Benvenuto, eds. (1985). Immunological Methods. Vol. 3. Orlando: Academic Press. ISBN 978-0-12-442703-7.
- Lefkovits, Ivan; Pernis, Benvenuto, eds. (1991). Immunological Methods. Vol. 4. San Diego: Academic Press. ISBN 978-0-12-442704-4.
- Steinberg, C. M.; Lefkovits, Ivan, eds. (1981). The Immune System (Festschrift in honor of Niels K. Jerne), Vols. I–II. Basel: Karger. ISBN 3-8055-3408-6.
- Lefkovits, Ivan, ed. (1996). Immunology Methods Manual: The Comprehensive Sourcebook of Techniques (4 vols. ed.). Academic Press. ISBN 978-0-12-442710-5.
- Lefkovits, Ivan (1986). "Self and non-self discrimination by "restriction proteases"". Proceedings of the National Academy of Sciences. 83 (10): 3437–3438. doi:10.1073/pnas.83.10.3437. PMC 323529.
- Kuhn, L.; Valiron, O.; Merle, A.; Kettman, J. R.; Lefkovits, Ivan (1988). "Toward an objective classification of cells in the immune system". Proceedings of the National Academy of Sciences. 85 (10): 3565–3569. doi:10.1073/pnas.85.10.3565. PMC 280254.
- Coleclough, C.; Kuhn, L.; Lefkovits, Ivan (March 1990). "Regulation of mRNA abundance in activated T lymphocytes: Identification of mRNA species affected by the inhibition of protein synthesis". Proceedings of the National Academy of Sciences. 87 (5): 1753–1757. doi:10.1073/pnas.87.5.1753. PMC 53561. PMID 2308934.
- Kettman, J. R.; Coleclough, C.; Lefkovits, Ivan (May 1990). "A strategy for founding a global lymphocyte proteinpaedia and gene catalogue". Immunology Today. 11 (5): 157–162. doi:10.1016/0167-5699(90)90066-I.
- Lefkovits, Ivan (5 April 2003). "Functional and structural proteomics: a critical appraisal". Journal of Chromatography B. 787 (1): 1–10. doi:10.1016/S1570-0232(02)00532-9.
- Zerkowski, H. R.; Grussenmeyer, T.; Matt, P.; Grapow, M.; Engelhardt, S.; Lefkovits, Ivan (2004). "Proteomics strategies in cardiovascular research". Journal of Proteome Research. 3 (2): 200–208. doi:10.1021/pr034079t.
- Lefkovits, Ivan, ed. (2016). »Mit meiner Vergangenheit lebe ich«: Memoiren von Holocaust-Überlebenden. Berlin: Jüdischer Verlag im Suhrkamp Verlag. ISBN 978-3-633-54277-2.

=== Memberships ===
- Member, Assembly, Czech Academy of Sciences (1993–2001)
- Member, Educational Committee, International Union of Immunological Societies (IUIS)
- Chair, Central European Summer School of Immunology (1992–1995)
- Member, International Cell Research Organization (ICRO)
- British Society for Immunology (UK)
- German Society for Immunology
- Swiss Society for Immunology (SSAI)
- Swiss Proteomics Society
- Honorary member, Indian Immunology Society
- Honorary member, Czechoslovak Immunological Society
- Honorary member, Czechoslovak Microbiological Society
- Honorary member, Learned Society of the Czech Republic

=== Awards ===
- Golden Reiman Medal (Reiman Society, Prešov), 1992
- G. J. Mendel Medal, Czech Academy of Sciences, 1995
- Purkyně Medal, Czech Medical Association of J. E. Purkyně (Medical Society), 2000
- Garnet Immunoglobulin of the Czech Immunological Society, 2007
- Honorary doctorate (Dr. h. c.), University of Prešov, Slovakia, 2007
- Golden 70th Anniversary Medal of the University of Košice, 2008
- Medal of Merit “De scientia et humanitate optime meritis”, Czech Academy of Sciences, 2016
