= Matzinger =

Matzinger is a German surname. Notable people with the surname include:

- Günther Matzinger (born 1987), Austrian Paralympic runner
- Polly Matzinger (born 1947), French-American immunologist
