= Paweł Kisielow =

Polish immunologist (born 1945)

- Born: February 21, 1945 (age 81); Gorlice, Poland
- Education: Adam Mickiewicz University; Polish Academy of Sciences
- Known for: research on T cells
- Awards: Körber European Science Prize (1997); Jurzykowski Prize (1992)
- Scientific career
- Fields: biology; immunology
- Institutions: Polish Academy of Sciences

Paweł Kisielow (Polish: [ˈpavɛw kiˈɕɛlɔv]; born 21 February 1945 in Gorlice, Poland) is a Polish biologist who specializes in immunology. He is best known for his research on T cells. He is a corresponding member of the Polish Academy of Sciences and a member of the Polish Academy of Arts and Sciences.

== Career ==
He graduated in biology from the Adam Mickiewicz University in Poznań and received a doctoral degree in 1971. He became a professor in 1987. He works at the Hirszfeld Institute of Immunology and Experimental Therapy of the Polish Academy of Sciences.

In 1992, he received the Jurzykowski Prize conferred by the Alfred Jurzykowski Foundation in New York.

In 1997, he was awarded the Körber European Science Prize jointly with Klaus Rajewsky and Harald von Boehmer for their work on mutant mouse models in clinical research. His scientific contributions have made significant progress towards better understanding the defense system leading to the development of treatments to support a weakened immune system, to combat cancer and to deal with autoimmune diseases.

In 2003, he became the recipient of the Prime Minister Award for his outstanding scientific output.

== Selected publications ==
- How does the immune system learn to distinguish between good and evil? The first definitive studies of T cell central tolerance and positive selection (2019)
- The evolutionary conservation of the bidirectional activity of the NWC gene promoter in jawed vertebrates and the domestication of the RAG transposon (with Lukasz Sniezewski, Sylwia Janik, Agnieszka Łaszkiewicz, Malgorzata Cebrat, 2017)
- Anti-GITR Antibody Treatment Increases TCR Repertoire Diversity of Regulatory but not Effector T Cells Engaged in the Immune Response Against B16 Melanoma (with Bozena Scirka, Edyta Anna Szurek, Maciej Pietrzak, Arkadiusz Miazek, 2017)
- Search for the Function of NWC, Third Gene Within RAG Locus: Generation and Characterization of NWC-Deficient Mice (with Monika Kasztura, Lukasz Sniezewski, Agnieszka Łaszkiewicz, 2015)

== See also ==
- List of Polish biologists
- Timeline of Polish science and technology
