= Scott K. Dessain =

American oncologist

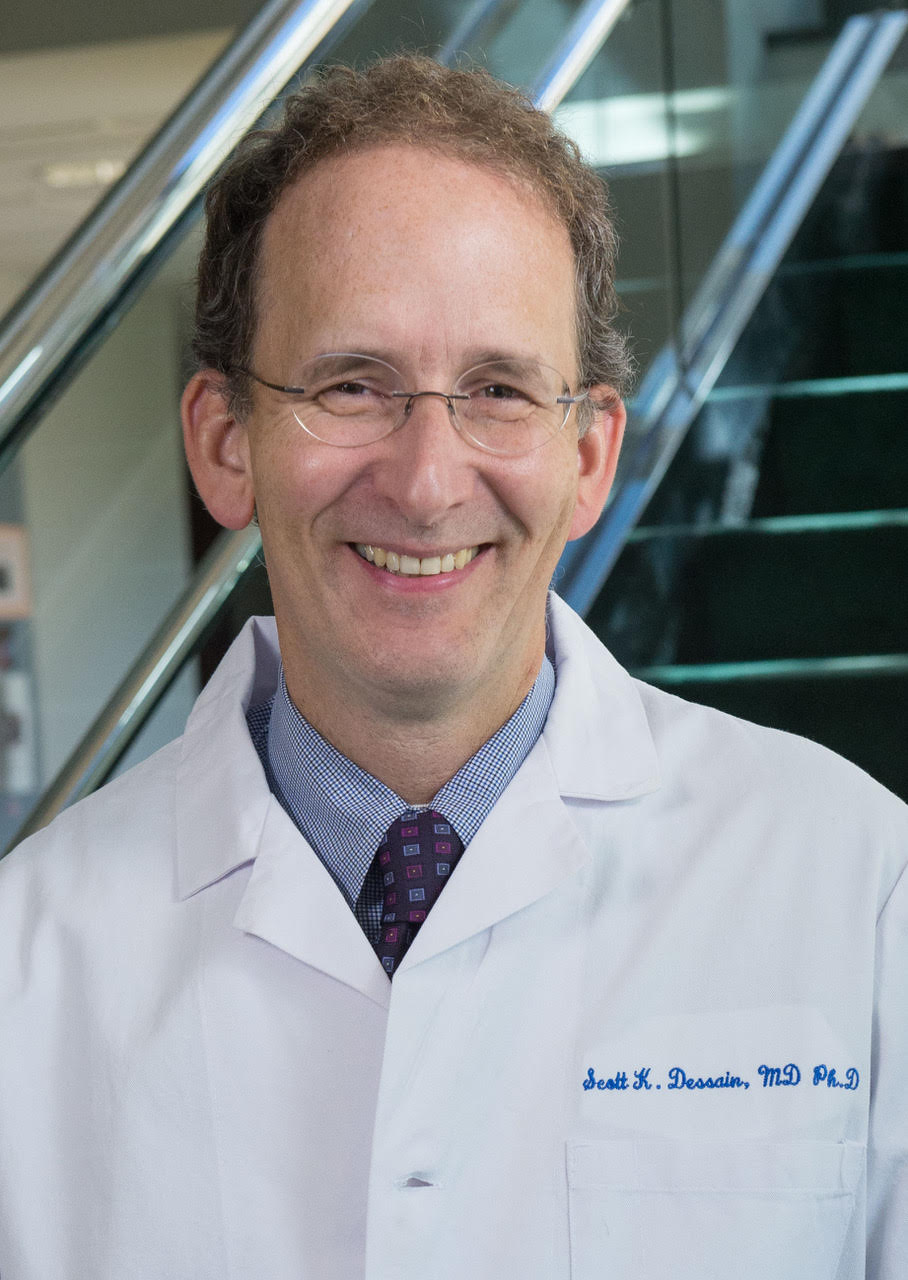
- Education: Yale University (MD, PhD); Brown University (AB)
- Scientific career
- Fields: Oncology, biochemistry, immunology, biotechnology
- Workplaces: Lankenau Institute for Medical Research; Thomas Jefferson University; Whitehead Institute for Biomedical Research

Scott K. Dessain is an American oncologist, research scientist, who is a professor at Lankenau Institute for Medical Research and an attending medical oncologist at Lankenau Medical Center, both in Wynnewood, Pennsylvania. He also is co-founder and chief technology officer of Immunome, Inc., a biotechnology company in Philadelphia specializing in development of native human cancer antibodies targeted against cancer antigens. Dessain developed a technology that caused cells to glow, which had been licensed for use by others.

== Education and career ==
Dessain earned his bachelor's degree from Brown University and his MD and PhD from Yale University. He completed a residency in internal medicine at Brigham and Women’s Hospital in Boston, followed by a fellowship in medical oncology at the Dana Farber/Partners CancerCare program, also in Boston.

In addition to his academic career, Dessain has worked as a biotechnology entrepreneur since 2006, when he co-founded Immunome. He served as chief scientific officer of Immunome until 2016, when he became chief technology officer.

On 13 November 2017, Dessain named The Joseph and Ray Gordon Chair in Clinical Oncology and Research by the Lankenau Medical Center Foundation.

Dessain was responsible for developing a technology that made cells glow, which was licensed to OCMS Bio. He also contributed to various studies, including a Nature Communications study about salmonella typhimurium biofilm disruption and an MDPI study on human IgA monoclonal antibodies. He has also worked in dilution cloning and with the antibody immunoglobulin A, among others.

== Books ==
- Dessain SK, editor (2008). Human Antibody Therapeutics for Viral Diseases. Berlin: Springer. (Current Topics in Microbiology and Immunology; vol. 317). ISBN 3540721444.
- Dessain S, Fishman S (2016). Preserving the Promise: Improving the Culture of Biotech Investment. 1st ed. Cambridge (MA): Academic Press. ISBN 0128092165.
