= Dilution cloning =

Method to obtain monoclonal cell populations by serial dilution

Dilution cloning (also called cloning by limiting dilution or simply limiting dilution) is a technique used to derive a monoclonal population from a heterogeneous cell mixture by distributing cells at sufficiently low density that some culture compartments (e.g., wells) contain a single viable cell. After expansion, wells seeded by one cell yield clonal progeny. The approach is widely used for isolating hybridomas and other mammalian cell clones, and has applications in immunology, microbiology, parasitology and stem cell biology.

== Principle ==
Limiting dilution relies on the Poisson distribution to set cell input so that a significant fraction of culture wells receive exactly one cell (and many receive none). After culture under suitable conditions (often with feeder cells and growth factors), wells are screened to identify monoclonal outgrowths. Statistical frameworks for dose–response design, analysis and estimation of clone-initiating cell frequencies are detailed in the immunology literature.

== History ==
Early forms of limiting dilution for obtaining pure microbial cultures date to the 19th century, and cloning of bacteria by isolation of single colonies on solid media was established by the late 1800s.

In immunology, the modern limiting-dilution microculture system for cloning and quantifying rare B- and T-lymphocyte precursors was developed in the 1970s in the laboratory of Ivan Lefkovits at the Basel Institute for Immunology and was subsequently formalized with Herman Waldmann; their monograph remains a primary reference for the method. Reviews in the 1980s outlined the theoretical basis and experimental implementations for lymphocyte cloning and frequency analysis. Lefkovits is widely credited with developing the microculture technique for inducing antibody-forming cells in limiting dilution cultures of mouse spleen cells.

== Applications ==
Dilution cloning is used to:

- derive monoclonal hybridoma and recombinant cell lines for antibody production;
- clone T cells and B cells for functional studies and epitope specificity mapping (often with feeder cells and cytokines);
- isolate parasites and other microbes at the single-organism level;
- estimate frequencies of rare precursor cells (e.g., cytotoxic T-lymphocyte or hematopoietic stem cell precursors) using statistical LDA frameworks.

== See also ==
- Serial dilution
- Hybridoma technology
- Poisson distribution
- Basel Institute for Immunology
