= Klaus Rajewsky =

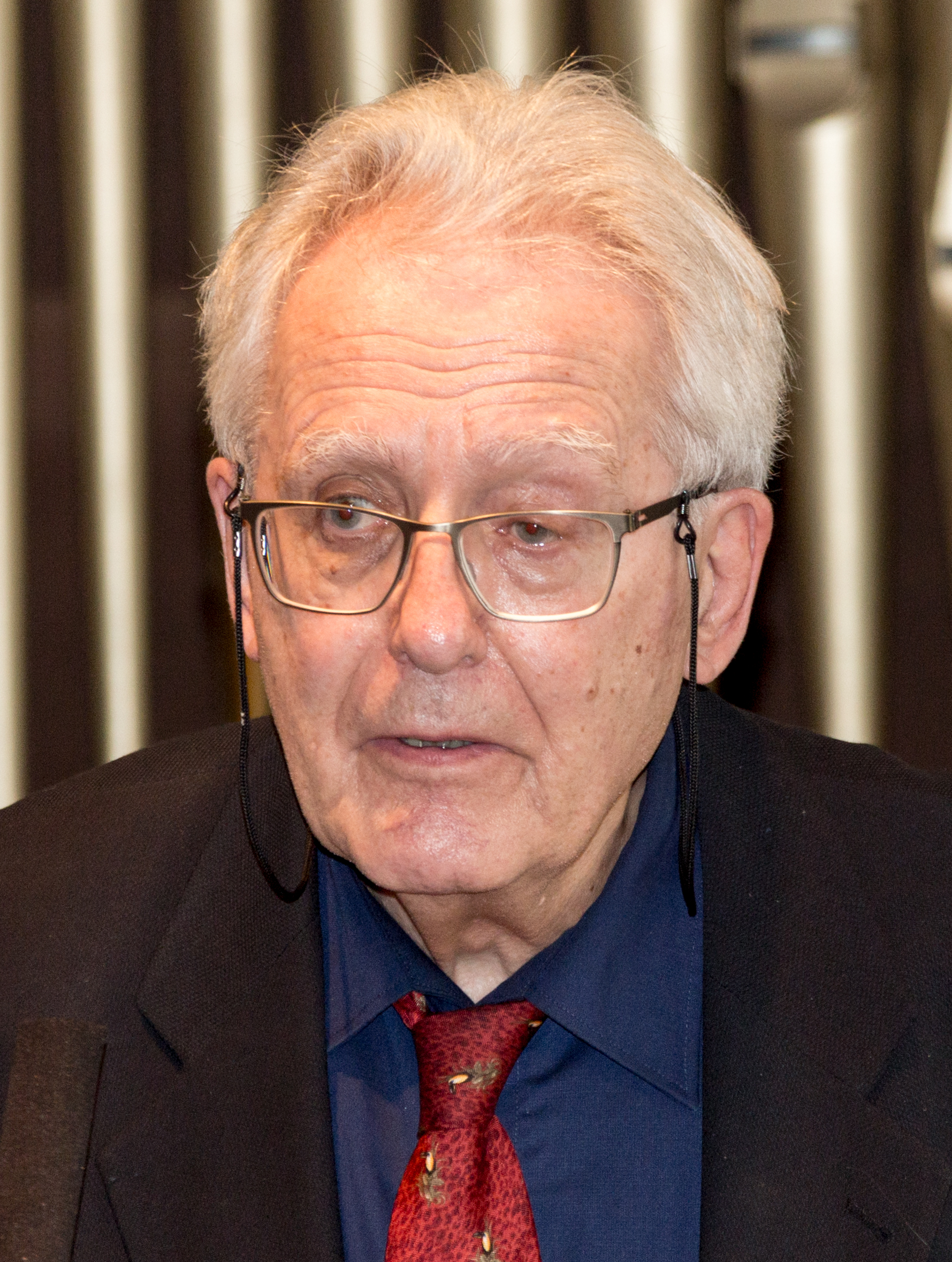
- Rajewsky in 2017
- Born: 12 November 1936 (age 89); Frankfurt am Main, Germany
- Occupation: Immunologist

Klaus Rajewsky (born 12 November 1936 in Frankfurt am Main) is a German immunologist, renowned for his work on B cells.

He studied medicine in Frankfurt, Munich and at the Pasteur Institute, Paris. In 1964 he started working at the Institute of Genetics in the University of Cologne, where he became professor for genetics. He researched Hodgkin's disease and the role of B cells within the immune system. He also developed conditional knockout mice based on Cre-Lox recombination.

He is one of the founding fathers of the German society for immunology (1967). Since 1994 he has been a member of the United States National Academy of Sciences. From 1995 to 2001 he was head of the Monterotondo station of the European Molecular Biology Laboratory near Rome. In 1996 he was awarded the Robert Koch Prize (shared with Fritz Melchers). In 1998 he founded Artemis Pharmaceuticals, together with Christiane Nüsslein-Volhard and Peter Stadler.

In 2001 he started working at the Center for Blood Research at Harvard Medical School, Boston, where an additional focus of his work concerns RNAi, especially microRNAs, in conjunction with immune development and control. Since start of 2012 he works at MDC Berlin.

Klaus Rajewsky is a son of the biophysicist Boris Rajewsky, and the father of the systems biologist Nikolaus Rajewsky.

== Awards ==
- 1977 Avery-Landsteiner Prize of the German society for immunology
- 1994 Behring Kitasato Prize from the Hoechst Japan
- 1996 Robert Koch Prize, together with Fritz Melchers
- 1997 Körber European Science Prize, together with Paweł Kisielow and Harald von Boehmer
- 2001 Deutscher Krebshilfepreis, together with Martin-Leo Hansmann and Ralf Küppers
- 2004 Honorary degree of the Johann Wolfgang Goethe University of Frankfurt am Main
- 2005 Charles Rodolphe Brupbacher Prize for Cancer Research, together with Mariano Barbacid
- 2007 Novartis Prize for Basic Immunology, together with Frederick Alt and Fritz Melchers
- 2008 Ernst Schering Prize
- 2009 Max Delbrück Medal
- 2009 William B. Coley Award for Distinguished Research in Tumor Immunology, together with Frederick Alt
- 2010 Ernst Jung Gold Medal for Medicine
- 2022 Mendel Medal by the Masaryk University
