= Jean Pieters =

Dutch biochemist

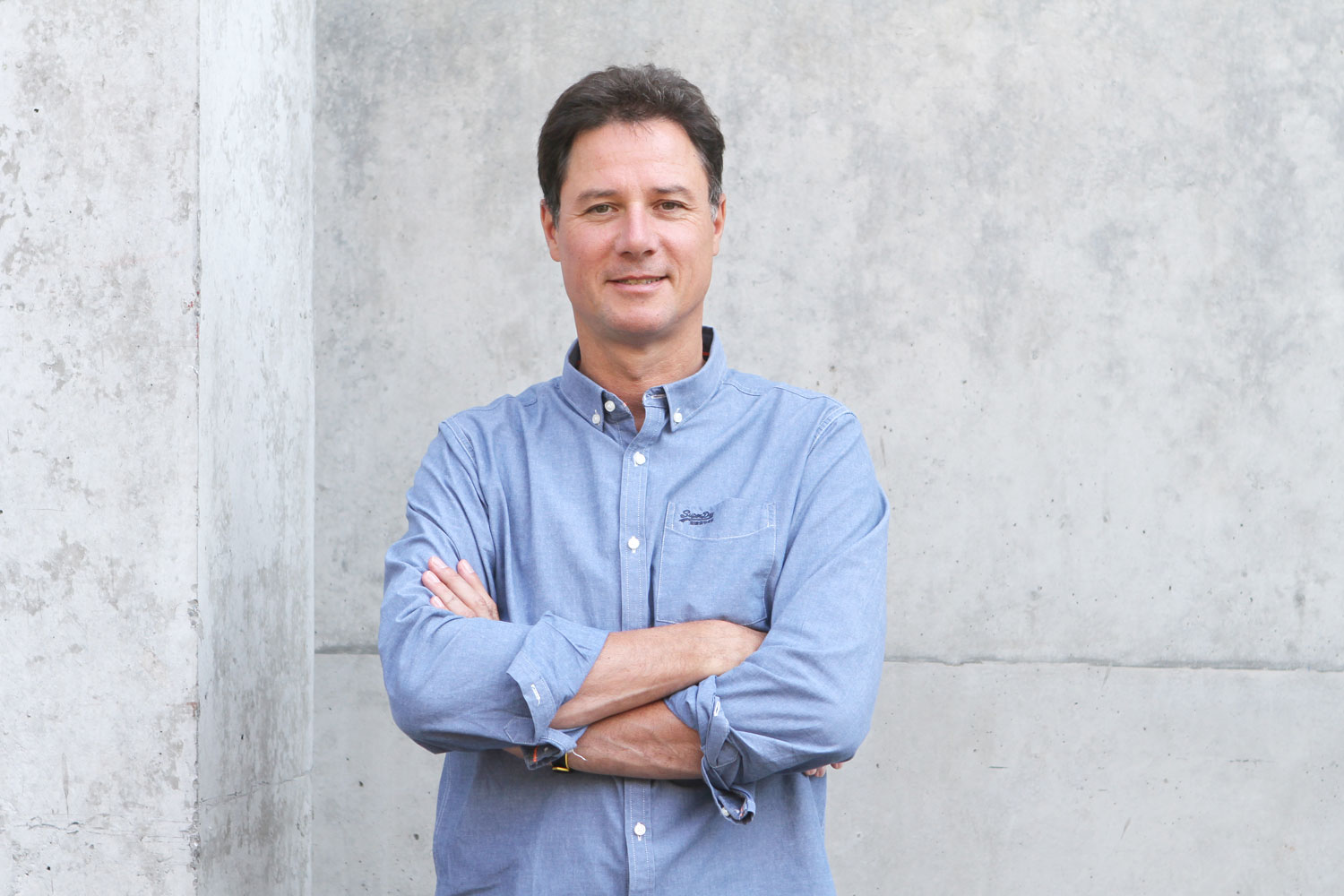
- Jean Pieters (2015)
- Scientific career
- Fields: Biochemistry
- Workplaces: University of Leuven, Maastricht University, European Molecular Biology Laboratory, Netherlands Cancer Institute in Amsterdam, Basel Institute for Immunology, Biozentrum University of Basel

Jean Pieters is a Dutch biochemist and Professor at the Biozentrum of the University of Basel, Switzerland.

== Life ==
Jean Pieters studied biochemistry and microbiology at the University of Leuven in Belgium. After completing his doctorate at Maastricht University, the Netherlands, he joined the European Molecular Biology Laboratory (EMBL) in Heidelberg in 1989 as a postdoctoral fellow in Bernhard Dobberstein's laboratory. From 1992 until 1995 Jean Pieters researched at the Netherlands Cancer Institute in Amsterdam as a junior group leader. In 1996 he was recruited to the Basel Institute for Immunology and in 2002 appointed to the Biozentrum at the University of Basel.

== Work ==
Jean Pieters investigates the role of coronin proteins in activating cellular signal transduction processes. Coronin proteins are widely distributed in the eukaryotic kingdom and conserved from yeast to man. One of the most conserved members of this protein family, mammalian coronin 1, was originally discovered in his laboratory as a host factor responsible for the intracellular survival of pathogenic mycobacteria. Subsequent work from his laboratory showed that coronin proteins regulate diverse physiologic processes including T cell homeostasis, learning and memory and development. More recently, his laboratory showed that coronin 1 signaling plays a crucial role in auto- and alloimmunity and that coronin-mediated signaling underlies the longevity of T cells. Research in his laboratory currently focusses on the role for coronin proteins in the establishment and regulation of cell populations.

== Awards and honors ==
- 2011 Elected corresponding member of the Royal Netherlands Academy of Arts and Sciences
- 2002 Friedrich Miescher Award
- 2001 Pfizer Forschungspreis
- 1999 Eppendorf Young Investigator Award

== Notable publications ==
- Jayachandran, Rajesh; Liu, Xiaolong; BoseDasgupta, Somdeb; Müller, Philipp; Zhang, Chun-Lei; Moshous, Despina; Studer, Vera; Schneider, Jacques; Genoud, Christel; Fossoud, Catherine; Gambino, Frédéric; Khelfaoui, Malik; Müller, Christian; Bartholdi, Deborah; Rossez, Helene; Stiess, Michael; Houbaert, Xander; Jaussi, Rolf; Frey, Daniel; Kammerer, Richard A.; Deupi, Xavier; de Villartay, Jean-Pierre; Lüthi, Andreas; Humeau, Yann; Pieters, Jean (25 March 2014). Dalva, Matthew (ed.). "Coronin 1 Regulates Cognition and Behavior through Modulation of cAMP/Protein Kinase A Signaling". PLOS Biology. 12 (3) e1001820. Public Library of Science (PLoS). doi:10.1371/journal.pbio.1001820. ISSN 1545-7885. PMC 3965382. PMID 24667537.
- Pieters, Jean; Muller, Philipp; Jayachandran, Rajesh (13 July 2013). "On guard: coronin proteins in innate and adaptive immunity". Nat Rev Immunol. 13 (7): 510–518. doi:10.1038/nri3465. PMID 23765056. S2CID 38179365.
- Mueller, Philipp; Massner, Jan; Jayachandran, Rajesh; Combaluzier, Benoit; Albrecht, Imke; Gatfield, John; Blum, Carmen; Ceredig, Rod; Rodewald, Hans-Reimer; Rolink, Antonius G; Pieters, Jean (16 March 2008). "Regulation of T cell survival through coronin-1–mediated generation of inositol-1,4,5-trisphosphate and calcium mobilization after T cell receptor triggering". Nature Immunology. 9 (4). Springer Science and Business Media LLC: 424–431. doi:10.1038/ni1570. ISSN 1529-2908. PMID 18345003. S2CID 26849229.
- Jayachandran, Rajesh; Sundaramurthy, Varadharajan; Combaluzier, Benoit; Mueller, Philipp; Korf, Hannelie; Huygen, Kris; Miyazaki, Toru; Albrecht, Imke; Massner, Jan; Pieters, Jean (13 July 2007). "Survival of Mycobacteria in Macrophages Is Mediated by Coronin 1-Dependent Activation of Calcineurin". Cell. 130 (1). Elsevier BV: 37–50. doi:10.1016/j.cell.2007.04.043. ISSN 0092-8674. PMID 17632055. S2CID 13254669.
- Ferrari, Giorgio; Langen, Hanno; Naito, Makoto; Pieters, Jean (14 May 1999). "A Coat Protein on Phagosomes Involved in the Intracellular Survival of Mycobacteria". Cell. 97 (4). Elsevier BV: 435–447. doi:10.1016/s0092-8674(00)80754-0. ISSN 0092-8674. PMID 10338208. S2CID 18159353.
- Tulp, Abraham; Verwoerd, Desirée; Dobberstein, Bernhard; Ploegh, Hidde L.; Pieters, Jean (12 May 1994). "Isolation and characterization of the intracellular MHC class II compartment" (PDF). Nature. 369 (6476). Springer Science and Business Media LLC: 120–126. Bibcode:1994Natur.369..120T. doi:10.1038/369120a0. ISSN 0028-0836. PMID 8177317. S2CID 4339206.
