= Antonio Lanzavecchia =

Italian and Swiss immunologist

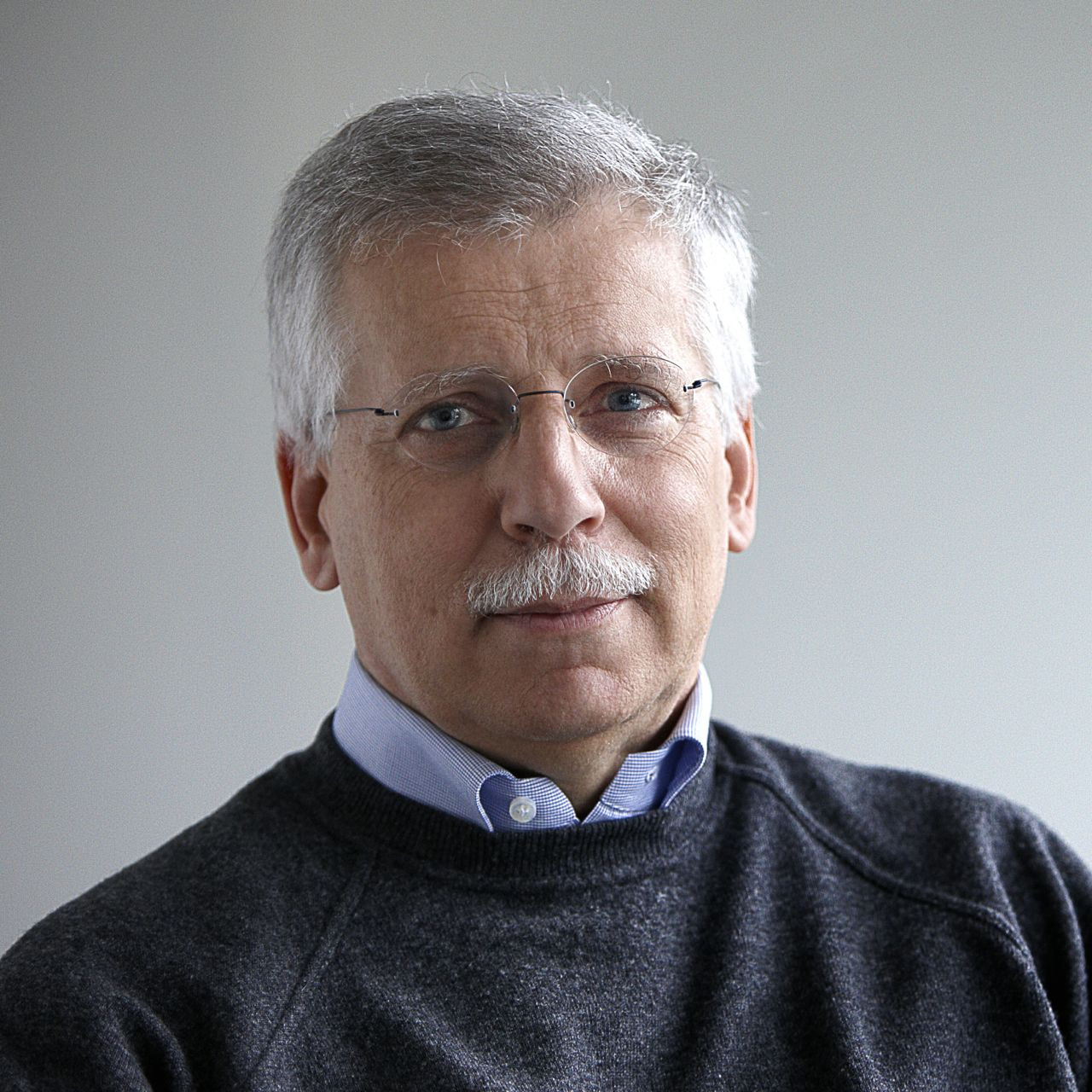
- Born: 9 October 1951 (age 75); Varese, Italy
- Education: University of Pavia
- Known for: Antigen presentation by B cells; monocyte-derived dendritic cells; serial triggering of the T cell receptor; central and effector memory T cells; human monoclonal antibodies
- Awards: EMBO Gold Medal (1988); Cloëtta Prize (1999); Robert Koch Award (2017); Louis-Jeantet Prize for Medicine (2018); Ernst Jung Medal for Medicine (2021)}}
- Scientific career
- Fields: Immunology
- Workplaces: Basel Institute for Immunology; Institute for Research in Biomedicine, Bellinzona; ETH Zurich; Università della Svizzera italiana Humabs BioMed; Istituto Nazionale di Genetica Molecolare
- Website: INGM

Antonio Lanzavecchia (born 9 October 1951) is an Italian immunologist. He heads the Human Immunology Program at the Istituto Nazionale di Genetica Molecolare (INGM) in Milan. He worked in Switzerland for most of his career: from 1983 to 1999 at the Basel Institute for Immunology, from 1999 to 2020 as founding director of the Institute for Research in Biomedicine (IRB) in Bellinzona, as professor of human immunology at ETH Zurich from 2009 to 2017, where he is professor emeritus, and thereafter at the Faculty of Biomedical Sciences of the Università della Svizzera italiana. He is the scientific founder of the antibody company Humabs BioMed, acquired by Vir Biotechnology in 2017, where he was senior vice-president and senior research fellow until 2026.

Working almost exclusively with human cells, Lanzavecchia showed that B cells capture and present antigen to helper T cells, introduced the derivation of dendritic cells from blood monocytes and defined their maturation programme, proposed the serial-triggering model of T cell receptor signalling, and identified central and effector memory T cells. From 2003 his laboratory developed methods to interrogate human memory B cells and plasma cells at high throughput, yielding broadly neutralising antibodies against influenza viruses, cytomegalovirus, coronaviruses and Ebola virus, and the discovery that antibodies raised against Plasmodium falciparum can acquire whole receptor domains by templated DNA insertion.

== Education and Career ==
Lanzavecchia was born in Varese and, as a fellow of the Collegio Borromeo, graduated in medicine with honours from the University of Pavia in 1976, where he subsequently specialised in paediatrics and in infectious diseases. After early work at the University of Genoa, he joined the Basel Institute for Immunology in 1983 and remained there until 1999.

In 1999 he founded the Institute for Research in Biomedicine in Bellinzona and directed it until 2020. He was full professor of human immunology at the Institute of Microbiology of ETH Zurich from 2009 to 2017 and remains professor emeritus there, and was subsequently professor at the Faculty of Biomedical Sciences of the Università della Svizzera italiana. He has also taught immunology at the University of Genoa and the University of Siena. He is now based in Italy, where he heads the Human Immunology Program at INGM in Milan. His work has been supported by three consecutive Advanced Grants of the European Research Council (IMMUNExplore, 2010–2015; BROADimmune, 2015–2020; ENGRAB, 2020–2025).

Lanzavecchia is the scientific founder of Humabs BioMed. The company began in 2004 as an incubator within the IRB, set up to develop and optimise the two antibody-isolation platforms devised in his laboratory, and was spun out as an independent company in 2011 with William J. Rutter, co-founder of Chiron Corporation, as founding investor and chairman of the board; Lanzavecchia served as chief scientific officer. He is named as an inventor on the patents covering these platforms and a number of the antibodies isolated with them, which formed the basis of the company's portfolio. Humabs was acquired by Vir Biotechnology in October 2017, and in December of that year Lanzavecchia was appointed senior vice-president and senior research fellow at Vir, a position he held until 2026.

== Research ==
Much of Lanzavecchia's work from the early 1990s onwards was carried out jointly with the immunologist Federica Sallusto. The collaboration began at the Basel Institute for Immunology and continued after she joined him in Bellinzona following his appointment there, and their co-authored papers span the period from 1994 to the 2020s. They include the derivation of dendritic cells from blood monocytes, the chemokine receptor programmes of polarised T helper cells, the definition of central and effector memory T cells, the synergistic action of Toll-like receptor agonist combinations on dendritic cells, the differentiation requirements of human Th17 cells, and the analysis of the human antibody response to malaria.

== Antigen presentation and dendritic cells ==
In 1985, using antigen-specific human T cell and B cell clones, Lanzavecchia demonstrated that B cells use surface immunoglobulin to capture, process and present antigen to helper T cells at concentrations orders of magnitude below those required by other antigen-presenting cells. The finding defined the molecular basis of T–B cooperation and provides the rationale for glycoconjugate vaccines. Related work established that peptides associate essentially irreversibly with MHC class II molecules in living cells, that class II molecules present processed self proteins, and that inflammatory stimuli redistribute class II complexes to the surface of dendritic cells.

In 1994, Sallusto and Lanzavecchia showed that human blood monocytes cultured with GM-CSF and interleukin-4 differentiate into cells with the properties of immature tissue dendritic cells. The protocol made human dendritic cells broadly accessible and became a standard reagent in the field. Using these cells the laboratory characterised antigen capture by macropinocytosis and the mannose receptor, and later showed that selected combinations of Toll-like receptor agonists act synergistically to drive a T helper 1-polarising programme.

== T cell activation and immunological memory ==
In 1995 the laboratory reported that a small number of peptide–MHC complexes can serially engage and downmodulate many T cell receptors, providing a kinetic explanation for T cell sensitivity. This was extended by the proposal that the number of receptors engaged, rather than a fixed affinity threshold, determines activation, and that costimulation lowers this tunable threshold, in part by reorganising membrane microdomains. In 1999, Sallusto and Lanzavecchia divided human memory T cells into central memory and effector memory subsets, distinguished by CCR7 expression, homing behaviour and effector function. The distinction is now standard in the analysis of vaccine responses and of adoptive cell therapy products. Work on human T helper subsets subsequently showed that interleukin-1β and interleukin-6, rather than transforming growth factor-β as in the mouse, are required for the differentiation of interleukin-17-producing cells, and defined the surface phenotype and antigenic specificity of human Th17 memory cells.

== Human monoclonal antibodies and vaccine design ==
An early translational application came in 1987, when Lanzavecchia and Doris Scheidegger produced bispecific antibodies by fusing a hypoxanthine–aminopterin–thymidine-sensitive, G418-resistant anti-CD3 hybridoma with a second antibody-producing cell, so that reassortment of heavy and light chains in the resulting hybrid hybridoma yielded molecules with one arm against CD3 and one against a chosen target. Such antibodies bridge human cytotoxic T lymphocytes to any cell bearing the target antigen and trigger its lysis; the strategy was demonstrated against HLA molecules, human immunoglobulins, Toxoplasma gondii and an ovarian carcinoma antigen, and is a precursor of the CD3-based bispecific T cell engagers later developed for cancer therapy. One such reagent, OC/TR, combining anti-CD3 with the MOv18 antibody against the folate receptor of ovarian carcinoma, was characterised with the Istituto Nazionale dei Tumori in Milan and became one of the first bispecific antibodies to reach clinical testing; in trials conducted by other groups, intraperitoneal treatment with autologous T lymphocytes retargeted by OC/TR produced responses in a proportion of patients with advanced ovarian carcinoma.

In 2004 the laboratory described an efficient method to immortalise human memory B cells with Epstein–Barr virus, and used it to isolate potent neutralising antibodies against SARS coronavirus. Antibodies isolated with this and related methods include FI6, which neutralises all influenza A subtypes tested; MPE8, which cross-neutralises four paramyxoviruses; mAb114, which protects against lethal Ebola virus infection and was approved by the FDA as ansuvimab in December 2020; and S309, isolated from a survivor of the 2003 SARS outbreak, which cross-neutralises SARS-CoV-2 and was developed into sotrovimab, authorised for emergency use in COVID-19 in May 2021.

These antibodies were also used as analytical reagents to identify the epitopes that confer protection and to guide the design of the corresponding immunogen, an approach the laboratory termed analytic vaccinology. Its clearest application was to cytomegalovirus: neutralising antibodies isolated from immune donors showed that the dominant protective response is directed against the gH/gL/pUL128L pentameric complex rather than glycoprotein B, and a recombinant pentamer designed on that basis selectively elicited potent neutralising antibodies. Related studies examined the mutational paths leading to antibody breadth and the somatic origin of autoantibodies in pemphigus.

== Malaria ==
From memory B cells of donors immunised with attenuated Plasmodium falciparum sporozoites the laboratory isolated a public antibody lineage, typified by MGG4, that binds both the central repeat of the circumsporozoite protein and a junctional peptide at its N terminus which is not present in the RTS,S vaccine; this dual binding was associated with potent inhibition of infection in humanised mice. The junctional region has since become a target for antimalarial monoclonal antibodies and for immunogen design.

Screening of donors from Kenya and Mali revealed antibodies carrying large insertions of genomic DNA encoding human inhibitory receptors. In the first such antibodies the insert encodes the collagen-binding domain of LAIR1 and confers broad reactivity against RIFIN variant surface antigens expressed on infected erythrocytes; two distinct insertion modalities generating these public antibodies were subsequently defined. A second class incorporates extracellular domains of the receptor LILRB1 at the variable–constant elbow and recognises a different set of RIFINs. Together the studies established templated insertion of host receptor sequences as a mechanism of antibody diversification distinct from V(D)J recombination and somatic hypermutation, and indicated that the parasite engages several inhibitory receptors as part of its immune evasion strategy.

== Awards ==
- EMBO Gold Medal, 1988
- Cloëtta Prize, 1999
- Order of Merit of the Italian Republic, Cavaliere della Repubblica, 2001
- Premio Ercole Pisello, 2014
- Robert Koch Medal and Award, Prize, 2017
- Sanofi-Institut Pasteur Award, 2017
- Louis-Jeantet Prize for Medicine, 2018
- ERC-AdG grants: IMMUNExplore 2010–15, BROADimmune 2015–20, ENGRAB 2020–2025
- Ernst Jung Gold Medal for Medicine 2021

== Honors ==
- He was elected to the European Molecular Biology Organization and, in 2016, as an international member of the US National Academy of Sciences, and is an honorary member of the Swiss Academy of Medical Sciences, the American Association of Immunologists and the Swiss Society for Allergology and Immunology. He served on the board of reviewing editors of Science from 1997 to 2005 and as an advisory editor of the Journal of Experimental Medicine.
- Three of his papers have been selected for the Pillars of Immunology series of the Journal of Immunology, which reprints reports judged to have shaped the course of the field, each with a commissioned commentary: the 1985 demonstration of antigen-specific T–B cooperation, the 1994 derivation of dendritic cells from blood monocytes, and the 1999 division of memory T cells into central and effector subsets.

== Editorial activities ==
- Science: board of reviewing editors 1997–2005
- European Journal of Immunology: executive committee member
- Journal of Experimental Medicine: advisory editor

== Selected Patents ==
- Monoclonal antibody production by EBV transformation of B cells (WO2004076677)
- Human cytomegalovirus neutralizing antibodies and use thereof (WO2008084410)
- Neutralizing anti-influenza virus antibodies and uses thereof (WO2010010467)
- Methods for producing antibodies from plasma cells (WO2010046775)

== Selected publications ==
- Lanzavecchia, Antonio (1985). "Antigen-specific interaction between T and B cells". Nature. 314 (6011): 537–539. Bibcode:1985Natur.314..537L. doi:10.1038/314537a0. ISSN 0028-0836. PMID 3157869.
- Lanzavecchia, Antonio; Scheidegger, Doris (1987). "The use of hybrid hybridomas to target human cytotoxic T lymphocytes". European Journal of Immunology. 17 (1): 105–111. doi:10.1002/eji.1830170118. ISSN 0014-2980. PMID 3102250.
- Sallusto, F; Lanzavecchia, A (1 April 1994). "Efficient presentation of soluble antigen by cultured human dendritic cells is maintained by granulocyte/macrophage colony-stimulating factor plus interleukin 4 and downregulated by tumor necrosis factor alpha". The Journal of Experimental Medicine. 179 (4): 1109–1118. doi:10.1084/jem.179.4.1109. ISSN 0022-1007. PMC 2191432. PMID 8145033.
- Valitutti, Salvatore; Müller, Sabina; Cella, Marina; Padovan, Elisabetta; Lanzavecchia, Antonio (1995). "Serial triggering of many T-cell receptors by a few peptide–MHC complexes". Nature. 375 (6527): 148–151. Bibcode:1995Natur.375..148V. doi:10.1038/375148a0. ISSN 0028-0836. PMID 7753171.
- Sallusto, Federica; Lenig, Danielle; Förster, Reinhold; Lipp, Martin; Lanzavecchia, Antonio (1999). "Two subsets of memory T lymphocytes with distinct homing potentials and effector functions". Nature. 401 (6754): 708–712. Bibcode:1999Natur.401..708S. doi:10.1038/44385. ISSN 0028-0836. PMID 10537110.
- Traggiai, Elisabetta; Becker, Stephan; Subbarao, Kanta; Kolesnikova, Larissa; Uematsu, Yasushi; Gismondo, Maria Rita; Murphy, Brian R; Rappuoli, Rino; Lanzavecchia, Antonio (1 August 2004). "An efficient method to make human monoclonal antibodies from memory B cells: potent neutralization of SARS coronavirus". Nature Medicine. 10 (8): 871–875. doi:10.1038/nm1080. ISSN 1078-8956. PMC 7095806. PMID 15247913.
- Corti, Davide; Voss, Jarrod; Gamblin, Steven J.; Codoni, Giosiana; Macagno, Annalisa; Jarrossay, David; Vachieri, Sebastien G.; Pinna, Debora; Minola, Andrea; Vanzetta, Fabrizia; Silacci, Chiara; Fernandez-Rodriguez, Blanca M.; Agatic, Gloria; Bianchi, Siro; Giacchetto-Sasselli, Isabella; Calder, Lesley; Sallusto, Federica; Collins, Patrick; Haire, Lesley F.; Temperton, Nigel; Langedijk, Johannes P. M.; Skehel, John J.; Lanzavecchia, Antonio (12 August 2011). "A Neutralizing Antibody Selected from Plasma Cells That Binds to Group 1 and Group 2 Influenza A Hemagglutinins". Science. 333 (6044): 850–856. Bibcode:2011Sci...333..850C. doi:10.1126/science.1205669. ISSN 0036-8075. PMID 21798894.
- Tan, Joshua; Pieper, Kathrin; Piccoli, Luca; Abdi, Abdirahman; Foglierini, Mathilde; Geiger, Roger; Maria Tully, Claire; Jarrossay, David; Maina Ndungu, Francis; Wambua, Juliana; Bejon, Philip; Silacci Fregni, Chiara; Fernandez-Rodriguez, Blanca; Barbieri, Sonia; Bianchi, Siro; Marsh, Kevin; Thathy, Vandana; Corti, Davide; Sallusto, Federica; Bull, Peter; Lanzavecchia, Antonio (2016). "A LAIR1 insertion generates broadly reactive antibodies against malaria variant antigens". Nature. 529 (7584): 105–109. Bibcode:2016Natur.529..105T. doi:10.1038/nature16450. ISSN 0028-0836. PMC 4869849. PMID 26700814.
- Chen, Yiwei; Xu, Kai; Piccoli, Luca; Foglierini, Mathilde; Tan, Joshua; Jin, Wenjie; Gorman, Jason; Tsybovsky, Yaroslav; Zhang, Baoshan; Traore, Boubacar; Silacci-Fregni, Chiara; Daubenberger, Claudia; Crompton, Peter D.; Geiger, Roger; Sallusto, Federica; Kwong, Peter D.; Lanzavecchia, Antonio (22 April 2021). "Structural basis of malaria RIFIN binding by LILRB1-containing antibodies". Nature. 592 (7855): 639–643. Bibcode:2021Natur.592..639C. doi:10.1038/s41586-021-03378-6. ISSN 0028-0836. PMC 8068667. PMID 33790470.
