= Basel Institute for Immunology =

Swiss research institute

- Parent institution: Hoffmann–La Roche
- Founder: F. Hoffmann–La Roche Ltd.
- Established: 1969
- Focus: Immunology
- Directors: Niels K. Jerne (1970–1980); Fritz Melchers (1980–2000)
- Location: Basel, Switzerland
- Dissolved: 2001

The Basel Institute for Immunology (BII) was an international research institute devoted to fundamental studies in immunology, located in Basel, Switzerland. Founded in 1969 by F. Hoffmann–La Roche and directed by Niels K. Jerne, it became one of the most influential centres of immunological research in the 20th century.

The institute was renowned for its unique model of flat hierarchy, scientific independence, and corporate funding without commercial constraints. During its thirty-year existence (1970–2001), the BII produced numerous landmark discoveries in modern immunology and trained more than 500 scientists, including several future Nobel Prize winners.

== History ==
=== Foundation and philosophy (1968–1971) ===
In the late 1960s, Roche executives Adolf Jann and Alfred Pletscher sought to establish a basic research institute that would promote immunology without the limitations of academic or profit-driven research. They invited Danish immunologist Niels K. Jerne to design and lead the new institution.

Construction began in 1968 on Grenzacherstrasse 487 in Basel, and the Basel Institute for Immunology officially opened on 1 October 1970. Jerne envisioned an institute that would, in his words, "let scientists be free from bureaucracy and hierarchy, with all focus on ideas, not administration".

== Structure and culture ==
The BII maintained a deliberately small scale—around 50 scientists at any one time, with an average age of about 35. Its organisation was highly unusual:

- No formal departments or rigid hierarchy
- Researchers appointed on renewable five-year terms to encourage intellectual exchange
- English used as the working language; by 1975, scientists represented over 17 nationalities
- Minimal administrative duties and strong emphasis on collaboration

Weekly Monday Lunch Seminars, open discussions, and cultural activities—including the Basel Theater of the Arts (BTA), a staff-run performance group—embodied Jerne’s belief that science and creativity were inseparable. The institute building featured open laboratories and communal areas designed for spontaneous interaction.

Sculptures such as Tinguely’s Double Helix and de Saint Phalle’s Gwendolyn stood at the entrance, symbolising the connection between art and science.

== Scientific contributions ==
Under Jerne’s direction, the BII became a focal point for conceptual and experimental immunology. Major advances associated with the institute include:

- The clonal selection theory and the idiotypic network hypothesis (Jerne, 1974)
- Discovery of the genetic mechanism that generates antibody diversity (Susumu Tonegawa, 1976)
- Development of hybridoma technology for producing monoclonal antibodies (Georges J. F. Köhler and César Milstein)
- Elucidation of T-cell receptor genetics and MHC recognition (Harald von Boehmer, Antonio Lanzavecchia, Ed Palmer, Brigitta Stockinger, and others)
- Studies on natural killer (NK) cells, immunological tolerance, and autoimmunity
- Conceptual developments such as the "Danger model" proposed by Polly Matzinger (1994)

The institute also played a leading role in applying new molecular and cellular techniques—flow cytometry, DNA cloning, and cell-fusion methods—to immunological problems.

== Awards and recognition ==
Scientists associated with the BII received numerous international honours:

Award	Year	Recipient(s)	Contribution
Nobel Prize in Physiology or Medicine	1984	Niels K. Jerne, Georges J. F. Köhler, César Milstein	Theories of immune system regulation and development of monoclonal antibodies.
Nobel Prize in Physiology or Medicine	1987	Susumu Tonegawa	Discovery of the genetic mechanism producing antibody diversity.
Cloëtta Prize	1978	Susumu Tonegawa	Work on somatic recombination of immunoglobulin genes.
EMBO Gold Medal and other major prizes	various	Antonio Lanzavecchia and others	Advances in cellular immunology and human T-cell biology.
Louis-Jeantet Prize for Medicine	1990	Harald von Boehmer	Through experiments involving the transfer of genes encoding the specific receptor of T lymphocytes.

Over its lifetime, BII researchers garnered more than twenty-seven major international scientific awards.

== Key personnel and alumni ==
Prominent scientists who worked at or were associated with the institute include:

- Niels K. Jerne – Founding Director (1970–1980)
- Fritz Melchers – Director (1980–2000)
- Ivan Lefkovits – Founding member and chronicler (author of History of the BII, 2017)
- Georges J. F. Köhler, Susumu Tonegawa, Harald von Boehmer, Antonio Coutinho, Chris Paige, Charley Steinberg, Polly Matzinger, Ed Palmer, Jean Pieters, Martin Flajnik, and many others who later became leading figures in immunology.

== Relationship with Roche ==
Although the institute was fully financed by F. Hoffmann–La Roche, with annual funding of roughly US$24 million, it operated with complete academic autonomy. Roche executives maintained a policy of non-interference in research direction, an arrangement unique among industrial sponsors.

Following the deaths of long-time patrons Paul Sacher and Alfred Pletscher, Roche reorganised its basic research structure in the late 1990s. The BII was closed in 2001, and parts of its activity were integrated into the Roche Center for Medical Genomics.

== Closure and legacy ==
The BII officially ceased operations at the end of 2001. The decision prompted widespread comment in the scientific press; Science wrote that "no other privately funded research institute had so thoroughly demonstrated the power of creative freedom in the life sciences".

All researchers were offered continuing employment or support for relocation, and many went on to head laboratories worldwide. Alumni founded more than two dozen biotechnology companies, and several joined leadership positions at Roche and Novartis.

The sculpture Double Helix was relocated to the Tinguely Museum in Basel as a memorial to the institute’s thirty-year legacy.

== Publications and archives ==
- Annual Reports of the Basel Institute for Immunology (1970–2000)
- Ivan Lefkovits (2017). History of the Basel Institute for Immunology. Basel: Karger.
- Archival materials and digital supplements are maintained by the University of Basel.

== See also ==
- Niels K. Jerne
- Georges J. F. Köhler
- Susumu Tonegawa
- Charley Steinberg
- Hoffmann–La Roche
- Immunology
- Monoclonal antibody
- Fritz Melchers (immunologist)

== Legacy summary ==
The Basel Institute for Immunology remains a landmark in the history of scientific organisation, demonstrating how philanthropic corporate funding, artistic spirit, and a non-hierarchical research environment can yield discoveries of lasting global significance.
