= Nikolaus Rajewsky =

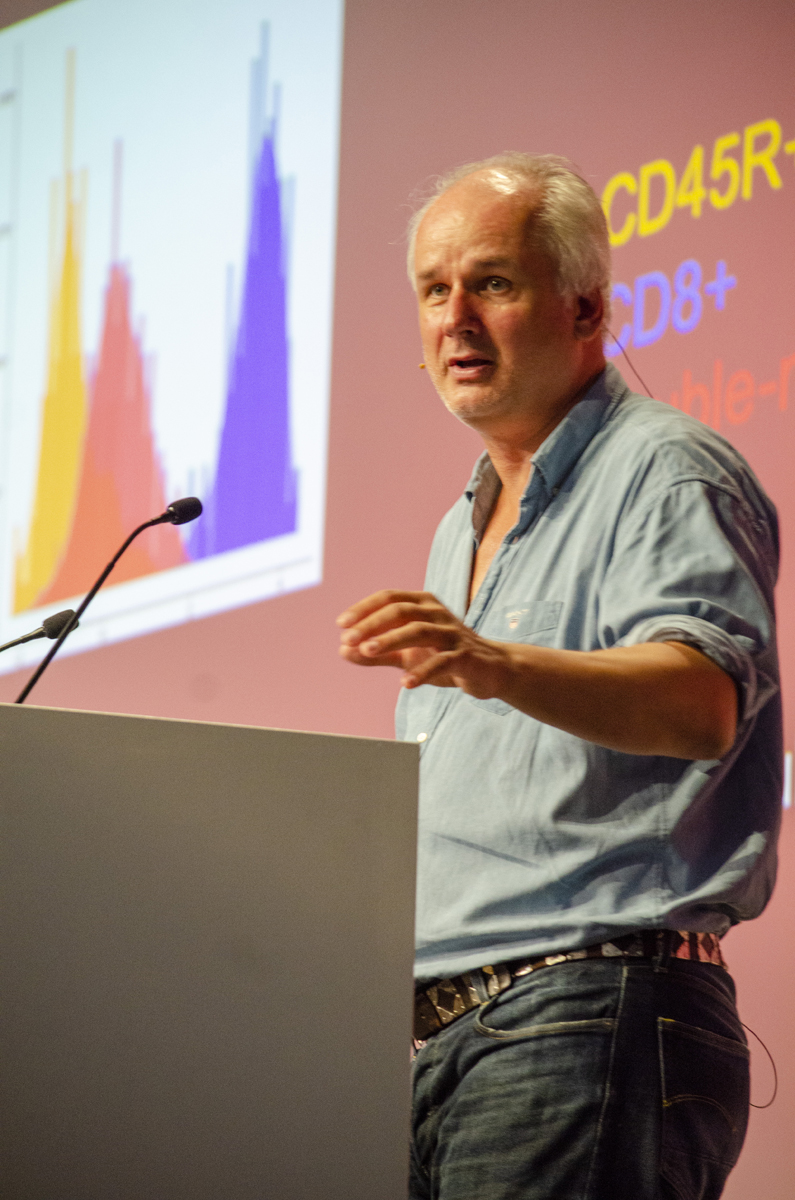
- Nikolaus Rajewsky speaking at the Intelligent Systems for Molecular Biology (ISMB) / European Conference on Computational Biology (ECCB) in Basel, 2019
- Born: 1968 (age 57–58); Cologne
- Education: Folkwang University of the Arts; University of Cologne (PhD)
- Awards: EMBO Membership (2010); Gottfried Wilhelm Leibniz Prize (2012)
- Scientific career
- Fields: Systems biology Developmental biology Gene regulation Genomics
- Workplaces: Max Delbrück Center for Molecular Medicine; Rutgers University; Rockefeller University; New York University
- Thesis: Exact results for one-dimensional stochastic processes (1997)
- Website: www.mdc-berlin.de/n-rajewsky

Nikolaus Rajewsky (born 1968) is a German system biologist at the Max-Delbrück-Center for Molecular Medicine (MDC) and at the Charité in Berlin. He founded and directs the "Berlin Institute for Medical Systems Biology" (BIMSB, Max-Delbrück-Center for Molecular Medicine) and leads a research group studying the role of RNA in gene regulation. Rajewsky also co-chairs LifeTime, a European research initiative focused on mapping, understanding, and targeting cells during disease progression. Rajewsky has received several awards and honors, including the Gottfried Wilhelm Leibniz Prize by the German Research Foundation (DFG).

== Early life and education ==
Nikolaus Rajewsky is the son of the Immunologist Klaus Rajewsky and the political scientist Christiane Rajewsky. He was born in Cologne. Between 1988 and 1993 he studied mathematics and physics at the University of Cologne and received his doctorate in theoretical physics in 1997 with his thesis Exact results for one-dimensional stochastic processes.

From 1991 to 1996, Rajewsky studied piano at the Folkwang University of the Arts in Essen and completed his studies with the artistic diploma (künstlerische Reifeprüfung).

== Career and research ==
Starting 1998, he worked as a postdoctoral fellow for mathematical statistical physics at Rutgers University in New Jersey and then, from 1999 to 2001, on computational biology at the Rockefeller University in New York City where he became a research professor in 2002. In 2003, he became an assistant professor at New York University (tenure track, Department of Biology and Courant Institute for Mathematical Sciences). In 2006, Rajewsky returned to Germany, where he became a full professor at the Max-Delbrück-Center for Molecular Medicine (MDC) in Berlin-Buch and at the Charité – Universitätsmedizin Berlin.

In 2008, Nikolaus Rajewsky founded the "Berlin Institute for Medical Systems Biology" (BIMSB). The mission of BIMSB is to directly integrate different levels of gene regulation to better understand how genotypes translate into phenotypes. This is achieved by promoting a highly collaborative environment and the synergistic application of computational and experimental methods. More recently, BIMSB engages in applying novel methods to disease progressions to find points where cells deviate from health. By understanding the molecular mechanisms underlying these deviations, new therapeutic targets can be identified. BIMSB integrates experimental and computational methods. BIMSB received initial funding from the Federal Ministry of Education and Research (BMBF) and the Berlin Senate as a pilot project. After a successful evaluation by the BMBF, it secured permanent funding of about 18 Million Euros per year. Since its beginning, BIMSB is headed by Nikolaus Rajewsky. The Humboldt-Universität zu Berlin (HU) included BIMSB in their (successful) application for the Excellence Initiative and provided the real estate on the new HU life science Campus in Berlin-Mitte. This neighbourhood is important for the BIMSB scientific mission and promotes collaborations between the HU, the Charité and the MDC. The BMBF provided additional money for the new building (33.5 million euros). Altogether, 21 group leaders have been recruited to BIMSB; currently 16 are there. In spring 2019 the labs moved from the Campus in Buch into the new building in Mitte. This building is designed to optimize communication between labs and the interaction between computation and experiments. On 26 February 2019 it was formally opened by the German Chancellor Angela Merkel who referred to BIMSB as a "beautiful gem" of the MDC.

Rajewsky's research focuses on understanding the role of RNA in gene regulation. He made contributions to understanding the function of microRNAs (miRNAs) and the mechanisms by which miRNAs exert function in animal cells. More recently, his lab published highly cited papers about circular RNAs (circRNAs). Very recently, the Rajewsky lab used single-cell methods to molecularly reconstruct animal tissues in space and time, including the lineage tree for an entire animal. His contributions were featured in the journal "Science" as part of the "Breakthrough of the year 2018".

Since 2017, Nikolaus Rajewsky chairs a pan-European consortium that is now called "LifeTime", co-chaired by Geneviève Almouzni from the Institute Curie. LifeTime's mission is to revolutionize healthcare by mapping, understanding, and targeting cells during disease progression. To accomplish this goal, LifeTime will integrate and apply single-cell multiomics, machine learning, and personalized disease models such as organoids. LifeTime is the shared vision of leading scientists from around 90 renowned organizations across Europe (17 Partners and 70 Associated Partners). LifeTime partners are supported by more than 70 companies across different sectors as well as other research institutions, national research funding agencies, research ministries, the EU Life Alliance and national science academies: the German Academy of Sciences (Leopoldina), the French Academy of Sciences, the Royal Netherlands Academy of Arts and Sciences and the Royal Society. The Science and Technology Advisory Board of LifeTime comprises internationally renowned scientists and industry leaders (including 3 Nobel laureates). In June 2020, under Rajewsky's coordination, LifeTime released the LifeTime Strategic Research Agenda which presents a detailed roadmap of how to leverage the latest scientific breakthroughs and technologies over the next decade, to track, understand and treat human cells throughout an individual's lifetime. In August 2020, the journal Nature published the Perspective article "LifeTime and improving European healthcare through cell-based interceptive medicine" where scientists explain how these technologies should be rapidly co-developed, transitioned into clinical settings and applied to the five major disease areas (neurological, infectious, chronic inflammatory and cardiovascular diseases and cancer).

== Awards and honors ==
- 2008 Anniversary Price of the German Society for Biochemistry, awarded by FEBS
- 2008 First prize from the Deutsche Gesellschaft für Gentherapie for the best paper
- 2008 For several years: Global Distinguished Professor of Biology at New York University, USA
- 2008 IUBMB - Medal for outstanding contributions
- 2009 Berlin Science Award (presented by the Governing Mayor of Berlin)
- 2010 Elected Member of European Molecular Biology Organization (EMBO)
- 2010 Elected Member of the Faculty of Natural Sciences, Humboldt-Universität zu Berlin
- 2010 Member of the Scientific Advisory Board of the MRC Institute "London Clinical Sciences"
- 2011–2017 Member of the advisory board of the Wissenschaftskolleg zu Berlin
- 2012 Gottfried Wilhelm Leibniz Prize by the German Research Foundation (DFG, 2.5 Million Euros; this is Germany's most prestigious research award)
- 2014 Honorary PhD in Human Biology and Medical Genetics by Sapienza University of Rome, Italy
- 2016 Visiting Professor for research activities at Sapienza University of Rome, Italy (1 month)
- 2017 Visiting Professor for research activities at Sapienza University of Rome, Italy (1 month)
- 2019 Elected member of the Leopoldina (Academy of Sciences Germany)

== Publications ==
As of January 2021 Google Scholar reports >50,000 citations for Nikolaus Rajewsky, with a h-index of 74 and an i10-index of 120.
