= Boris Rajewsky =

German biophysicist (1893–1974)

- Born: 17 July 1893; Chigirin, Kiev Governorate, Russian Empire (now Ukraine)
- Died: 22 November 1974 (aged 81); Frankfurt am Main, Germany
- Scientific career
- Fields: Chemist, biophysicist

Boris Rajewsky (Russian: Борис Николаевич Раевский; Ukrainian: Борис Миколайович Раєвський; 17 July 1893 – 22 November 1974) was a Russian-born German biophysicist, who was one of the most influential researchers on the impact of radiation on living organisms in the 20th century. He served as Rector of the Goethe University Frankfurt from 1949 to 1951.

== Life and career ==
He was born into a Russian noble family. He studied physics at the St. Vladimir Imperial University of Kiev from 1912, and obtained a doctorate there in 1918. He moved to Germany in 1922 and became a German citizen in 1927. He became the assistant of Friedrich Dessauer and obtained an additional doctorate at the Goethe University in 1929. In 1934 he became Professor of Physics at the Goethe University, and in 1943 he became Pro-Rector of the university. He served as the university's Rector 1949–1951 and again as Pro-Rector 1951–1954. From 1946 he was chairman of the scientific council of the Max Planck Society, and in 1955, he became an adviser to the German Atomic Commission, a body of experts appointed by the federal government.

He was a member of the Nazi Party from 1937 to 1945. However, he later maintained that he had always been an opponent of national socialism.

He was the father of the noted cell biologist and cancer researcher Manfred F. Rajewsky (1934–2013), of the noted immunologist Klaus Rajewsky (b. 1936), and of the sociologist Xenia Julia Maria Rajewsky (1939–2011).

== Honours ==
- Honorary doctorates at the Free University of Berlin, the University of Giessen, Leibniz University Hannover, the University of Innsbruck, the University of Naples and the University of Turin
- Member of the Scientific Society (Wissenschaftliche Gesellschaft) at the Goethe University Frankfurt (from 1955 to 1970 as President)
- Faculty Medal of the Faculty of Natural Sciences, Goethe University Frankfurt
- Gold Medal of the Sapienza University of Rome
- Fellow of the Academy of Sciences Leopoldina
- Goethe Plaque of the City of Frankfurt, 1951
- Commander's Cross (Großes Verdienstkreuz) of the Order of Merit of the Federal Republic of Germany, 1953
- Goethe Plaque of the State of Hesse, 1958
- Academia Medica in Rome, 1959
- Sigillum Magnum of the University of Bologna, 1962
- Knight Commander's Cross (Großes Verdienstkreuz mit Stern) of the Order of Merit of the Federal Republic of Germany, 1963
- Lenin Medal in Gold

== Bibliography ==
- Muth, H. (1973). "Boris Rajewsky zum 80. Geburtstag". Biophysik. 10 (3): 3–5. doi:10.1007/BF01189906. PMID 4590207. S2CID 89122873.
- Muth, H. (1975). "Boris Rajewsky 1893–1974". Radiation and Environmental Biophysics. 12: 3. doi:10.1007/BF02339803. S2CID 84399328.
- Lohr, E; Scherer, E (2004). "Boris Rajewsky (1893-1974). A look back on his life and work" (PDF). Strahlentherapie und Onkologie. 180 (1): 1–4. PMID 14765550. Archived from the original (PDF) on 2012-03-22.
- V, Radiz Schlema e (1993). Boris Rajewsky: 19. Juli 1893 - 22. November 1974; zum 100. Geburtstag.
- Oliva, L (1977). "Boris Rajewsky, 1893-1974". La Radiologia Medica. 63 (3): 264–5. PMID 327514.
- Frommhold, W (1975). "Obituary. Boris Rajewsky July 19, 1893 - November 22, 1974". RoFo: Fortschritte Auf dem Gebiete der Rontgenstrahlen und der Nuklearmedizin. 122 (2): 184. PMID 126917.
- Becker, J; Kuttig, H (1975). "Boris Rajewsky 1893-1974". Strahlentherapie. 149 (5): 552–3. PMID 1098225.

== Literature ==
- Alexander Kaul (2003). "Rajewsky, Boris". Neue Deutsche Biographie (in German). Vol. 21. Berlin: Duncker & Humblot. pp. 125–126. (full text online).
- H. Muth: Boris Rajewsky zum 80. Geburtstag. in: Biophysik 10, 3-5 (1973)
