= Seung-Yong Seong =

South Korean biologist (born c. 1965)

- Born: 1964 or 1965 (age 61–62)

Academic background
- Education: Seoul National University

Academic work
- Institutions: Seoul National University

Korean name
- Hangul: 성승용
- Hanja: 成承鏞
- RR: Seong Seungyong
- MR: Sŏng Sŭngyong

Seung-Yong Seong (born c. 1965) is a South Korean immunologist and microbiologist known for his study of innate immune system response and his development of the damage-associated molecular pattern (DAMP) model of immune response initiation in collaboration with Polly Matzinger. Seong is also known for his research on the bacterium Orientia tsutsugamushi and his research on immunological adjuvant when he was a student. Since 2013 he has served as director of the Wide River Institute of Immunology – Seoul National University in conjunction with his professor position in the Microbiology and Immunology department of Seoul National University College of Medicine. In 2012, he became editor in chief of the World Journal of Immunology. Seung-Yong Seong (born c. 1965) is a South Korean immunologist and microbiologist known for his study of innate immune system response and his development of the damage-associated molecular pattern (DAMP) model of immune response initiation in collaboration with Polly Matzinger. Seong is also known for his research on the bacterium Orientia tsutsugamushi and his research on immunological adjuvant when he was a student. Since 2013 he has served as director of the Wide River Institute of Immunology – Seoul National University in conjunction with his professor position in the Microbiology and Immunology department of Seoul National University College of Medicine. In 2012, he became editor in chief of the World Journal of Immunology.

== Career ==
Seong earned his medical degree (M.D.) in 1990 from Seoul National University College of Medicine. After receiving his M.D., Seong continued his education at Seoul National University College of Medicine and was awarded Doctor of Philosophy in both Immunology and Microbiology in 1995. From 1995 to 1998 he worked as a doctor for public health in the Biomedical Research division of the Korea Institute of Science and Technology. While working at the Korea Institute of Science and Technology, Seong's research focused on immunologic study of mucosal membranes and developing a vaccine against Streptococcus pneumoniae, a causative agent of both pneumonia and meningitis. In 1998, he became an assistant professor at Seoul National University College of Medicine in the Microbiology department and in 2010, became a full professor. From 2001 to 2004, Seong worked in the National Institute of Health Laboratory of Cellular and Molecular Immunology as a research fellow. In 2012, he became the associate dean for planning of Seoul National University College of Medicine and since his appointment in 2013 he has served as the director of Wide River Institute of Immunology.

Currently, Seong serves as associate dean for Graduate Study and Professor of Seoul National University College of Medicine, as well as editor in chief of World Journal of Immunology. Additionally, he has acted as Director of R&D Promotion for the Department of Disease Research – Korea Health Industry Development institute since 2008.

Seong is a member of the Korean Society for Microbiology, Korean Society for Immunology, American Society for Microbiology, and American Society for Immunology. He currently acts as president of the Korean Society for Dendritic Cells and Secretary of the International DAMPs Association.The International DAMPs Association is a society of researchers from varying disciplines whose goal is to investigate the numerous roles of Damage associated molecular patterns in disease, injury and infection.

Seong's primary research interest is the interaction of DAMPs, Pathogen-associated molecular patterns (PAMPs) and hyppos (hydrophobic portions exposed on the surface of denatured molecule or molecular aggregates) in immune response initiation. His lab also studies dendritic cells, cancer immunotherapy and single domain antibody therapies. His current research is centered on the DAMPs Model of immune response initiation, and investigating novel hyppo centered treatments for inflammatory diseases. Outside of the DAMPs innate immune response model, Seong's lab is working on developing dendritic cell based cancer vaccines and the development of recombinant camel antibodies specific to tumor antigens for therapeutic use.

== Damage Associated Molecular Pattern model research ==
The major focus of Seong's lab is to obtain a more thorough understanding of the DAMPs model of immunity and the potential impact this model may have in the treatment of inflammatory diseases. The DAMPs model was suggested by Seong in 2004 and combines elements of the Self-Non-Self and Danger Model to explain innate immune response. The DAMPs model involves the immune-stimulatory ability of exposed hydrophobic portions of denatured molecules (hyppos, water-insoluble molecules) from both endogenous and exogenous sources. Seong proposes that PAMPs, and alarmin originated from a common DAMPs ancestral subfamily and were modified by the innate immune system to stimulate immune response in addition to cell damage repair. In addition, the DAMPs model suggests that the early immune system evolved from an ancient damage response initiation pathway directed by the presence of hyppos. From the similarities between PAMPs, alarmins, and DAMPs as well as the evolutionary relationship between immune response systems and damage repair response systems, Seong proposed the presence of a universal mechanism of cellular response to injury and instigation of repair.

In his study of hyppos and the DAMPs model Seong discovered molecules termed "hyppo-quenchers" which prevent initiation of immune responses by hyppos when the cell is not in normal physiological conditions. Hyppo-quenchers prevent immune response by inhibiting interaction between hyppos and their receptors. In studying nuclear factor-κB dependent gene expression Seong found strong evidence that apolipoproteins function as a hyppo-quencher. When exposed to high hyppo levels, cells with apolipoproteins did not initiate immune responses evidencing their role as a hyppo-quencher.

Seong has continued his study of the DAMPs Model with his research on the role of DAMPs and hyppos in several inflammatory diseases. In particular, his lab studies the role of hyppos in Alzheimer's disease, sepsis, ulcerative colitis and atopic dermatitis. In pathological conditions and cases of cell damage the concentration of exposed hyppos in tissue microenvironment is too great to be resolved by activity of quenchers. When exposed to aqueous conditions hyppos incorrectly aggregate with one another through hydrophobic interactions resulting in potentially toxic proteins and activation of innate immune response resulting in inflammation. Thus, constantly elevated hyppo levels can lead to chronic inflammation. The goal of his study into diseases potentially caused by hyppos is to examine the therapeutic potential of hyppo-quenchers for treatment of inflammatory diseases based on his hypothesis that hyppo-quenchers might have evolved as an immune modulator. Recently, he is carrying out phase I clinical trial for Atopic dermatitis using small molecule that quenches hyppo at micromolar concentration and regulate inflammation at nanomolar concentration by interacting with GPCR19.
