= Polly Matzinger =

French-born American immunologist

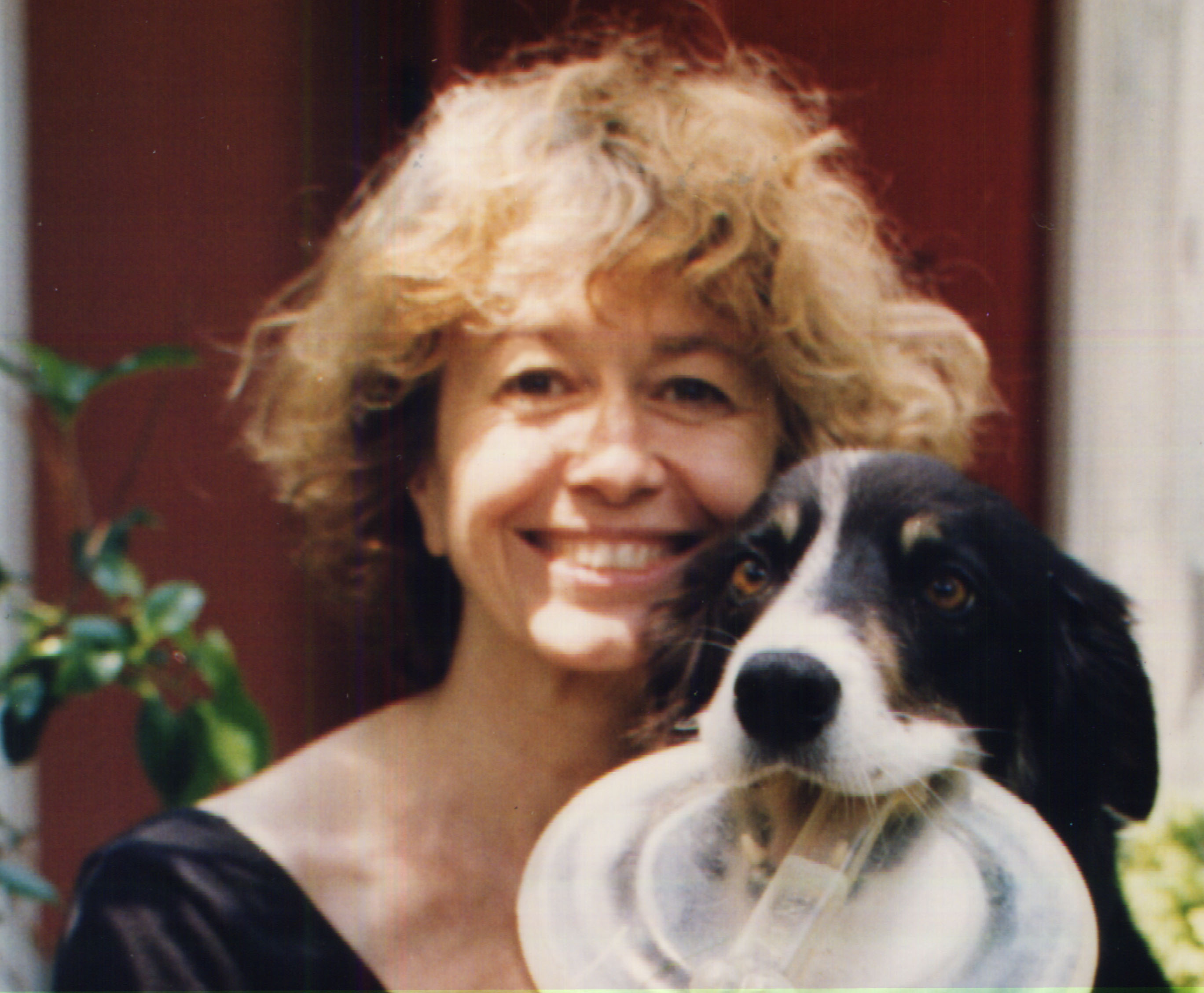
- Born: July 21, 1947 (age 79); La Seyne, France
- Education: University of California, Irvine (BS); University of California, San Diego (PhD)
- Known for: Danger model
- Scientific career
- Fields: Immunology
- Workplaces: National Institute of Allergy and Infectious Diseases

Polly Celine Eveline Matzinger (born July 21, 1947) is a French-born immunologist who proposed the danger model theory of how the immune system works.

== Early years ==
Polly Matzinger was born on July 21, 1947, in France to a French mother (Simone) and a Dutch father (Hans). In 1954, she immigrated to the U.S. with her sister, Marjolaine, and parents. Her prior jobs included being a bass jazz musician, carpenter, dog trainer, waitress, and Playboy Bunny. She finished her bachelor's of science in biology at the University of California, Irvine in 1976, and doctorate in biology at the University of California, San Diego in 1979. She then did four years of postdoctoral work at the University of Cambridge and was a scientist at the Basel Institute for Immunology for six years before working at the National Institutes of Health in Bethesda, Maryland.

== Ghost Lab at NIAID ==
Matzinger is chief of the T-Cell Tolerance and Memory Section at the U.S. National Institute of Allergy and Infectious Diseases (NIAID). The lab has been referred to as the "Ghost Lab" for Matzinger's choice to conduct the first nine months of her research alone with a focus on chaos theory. In 2013, while reorganizing the Laboratory of Cellular and Molecular Immunology, NIAID transferred Matzinger's section to the Laboratory of Immunogenetics.

In 2015, Matzinger recorded an eight-part series on the danger model of the immune system, covering transplant rejection, tumors, autoimmunity, T cells, parasites, and alarmins.

== Research ==
=== The danger model ===
The Self/Non-self Model proposed by Macfarlane Burnet and Frank Fenner in 1949 faced challenges in the late 1980s as immunologists recognized that T cells depend on antigen-presenting cells showcasing materials and sending co-stimulatory signals. Driven by the writings of Thomas Kuhn on paradigm shifts in science, Charles Janeway made a 1989 proposal that the innate immune system was the real gatekeeper of immune system responses. He also theorized that the innate immune system used ancient pattern-recognition receptors to make these decisions, recognizing a pathogen by its unchanging characteristics.

==== Danger signals ====
In her 1994 article "Tolerance, Danger, and the Extended Family", Matzinger extended the danger model, arguing that antigen-presenting cells respond to "danger signals" released from cells undergoing unprogrammed cell death when injured or stressed, as opposed to apoptosis (controlled cell death). The alarm signals released by these cells let the immune system know that there is a problem requiring an immune response. She argued that T cells and the immune response they orchestrate occur not because of a neonatal definition of "self", as in the previous model, nor because of ancient definitions of pathogens, as in Janeway's argument, but because of a dynamic and constantly updated response to danger as defined by cellular damage.

==== Scope ====
The danger model is broad, covering topics as diverse as transplantation, maternal/fetal immunity, autoimmunity, cancer treatments, and vaccines. Matzinger argued that prior models failed to explain why immune system responses vary based on the specific threat's location and severity. Prior models also fail to explain how the immune system rejects tumors, induces autoimmune diseases, or generates allergic responses.

Some immunologists still maintain Janeway's ideas, believing that the immune response is mainly fueled by innate evolutionarily conserved "pattern recognition receptors" that recognize similarities between microorganisms, minimizing the effects of unprogrammed cell death.

=== Pattern recognition and a tissue-driven immune system ===
Seung-Yong Seong and Matzinger have proposed exposed hydrophobic regions on biological compounds as among the damage-associated molecular patterns (DAMPs) of the danger model. Facing stressors, cells misfold and denature their proteins, exposing hydrophobic regions that aggregate into clumps to avoid exposure to the water-filled environment.

In a 2013 article in Nature Immunology, Matzinger highlighted the danger model's primary implication that bodily tissues drive immune responses. As research continues to show the bacteria of each organ's microbiome guiding its function and outputs, Matzinger theorizes that microbes may be shown as driving immune system responses. Matzinger argues that DAMPs may explain why toll-like receptors respond to both external and endogenous ligand signals with her danger model suggesting a multitude of signalling pathways determining the extent and nature of each immune system response.

=== Challenges to Matzinger's theories ===
Regulatory T cells have been shown suppressing immune responses, exemplified by the autoimmune IPEX syndrome occurring when the master regulator of these T_{reg} cells is dysfunctional. Matzinger has incorporated T_{reg} cells into her danger model, arguing that their regulation activity is not absolute, based on transplant organs being rejected at higher rates if infected, showing that danger signals continue to dictate the immune response.

Criticisms of the danger model focus on two key points: First, Matzinger argued that tumors persist to cause cancer because their cells undergo programmed cell death, failing to release danger signals for an immune response. However, recent research has shown the immune system detecting and destroying some tumors. Second, the danger model explains transplant rejection as the result of surgery-induced damage, but this explanation fails to account for greater tolerance of autotransplantation, the movement of tissue between parts of the same body.

Terms coined by Matzinger, such as "professional antigen-presenting-cell", "danger signal", and "DAMPs", are frequently repurposed for explanations of the self/non-self model of the immune system. The immunologist Russell E. Vance has argued that immunological paradigms like the danger model are inevitably inaccurate representations of distinct mechanisms generated under evolutionary pressure.

=== Dog co-author controversy ===
In 1978, Matzinger published her fourth paper in the Journal of Experimental Medicine, listing her Afghan Hound, Galadriel Mirkwood, as a fictional coauthor, so that she could write the paper in the first-person plural, active voice. When the journal editors discovered this, they banned her from publication.

== Awards ==
At the 1986 Köln Film Festival, Polly Matzinger won the Award for Special Excellence in Educational Films for the German translation of Immunity: The Inside Story. In 1996, she was inducted as an honorary lifetime member of the Scandinavian Society of Immunology. In 2002, Discover magazine recognized Matzinger as one of the fifty most important women in science. In 2003, she received an honorary doctorate from Hasselt University. In 2008, she was listed as a "Highly Cited" research among the top 1% of citations for her field on the Web of Science.

Since 2009, the biotechnology company EpiVax has funded the Polly Matzinger Fearless Scientist Scholarship for women scientists at the University of Rhode Island's Institute for Immunology & Informatics that overcome challenges.

== Publications ==
- Matzinger P., Mirkwood G. (1978). "In a fully H-2 incompatible chimera, T cells of donor origin can respond to minor histocompatibility antigens in association with either donor or host H-2 type". Journal of Experimental Medicine. 148 (1): 84–92. doi:10.1084/jem.148.1.84. PMC 2184911. PMID 78964.
- Lassila, O., Vainio, O. and Matzinger, P. (1988). Can B cells turn on virgin T cells? Nature, 334, 253–255. (the article in which "professional antigen presenting cells" were first named)
- Fuchs E., Matzinger P. B. (1992). "B cells turn off virgin but not memory T cells". Science. 258 (5085): 1156–1159. Bibcode:1992Sci...258.1156F. doi:10.1126/science.1439825. PMID 1439825.
- Matzinger P (1994). "Tolerance, Danger, and the Extended Family". Annual Review of Immunology. 12: 991–1045. doi:10.1146/annurev.iy.12.040194.005015. PMID 8011301.
- Ridge J.P.; Fuchs E.; Matzinger P. (1996). "Neonatal tolerance revisited: turning on newborn T cells with dendritic cells". Science. 271 (5256): 1723–1726. Bibcode:1996Sci...271.1723R. doi:10.1126/science.271.5256.1723. PMID 8596932. S2CID 42548782.
- Ridge J.P.; Di Rosa F.; Matzinger P. (1998). "A conditioned dendritic cell can be a temporal bridge between a CD4+ T helper cell and a T- killer cell". Nature. 393 (6684): 474–478. doi:10.1038/30989. PMID 9624003. S2CID 4427685.
- Gallucci S.; Lolkema M.; Matzinger P. (1999). "Natural adjuvants: Endogenous activators of dendritic cells". Nature Medicine. 5 (11): 1249–1255. doi:10.1038/15200. PMID 10545990. S2CID 29090284.
- Matzinger P (2002). "The Danger Model: A Renewed Sense of Self" (PDF). Science. 296 (5566): 301–305. Bibcode:2002Sci...296..301M. CiteSeerX 10.1.1.127.558. doi:10.1126/science.1071059. PMID 11951032. S2CID 13615808.
- Seong S., Matzinger P. (2004). "Hydrophobicity, an ancient Damage-associated Molecular Pattern that initiates Innate Immune Responses". Nature Reviews Immunology. 4 (6): 469–78. doi:10.1038/nri1372. PMID 15173835. S2CID 13336660.
- Matzinger P (2007). "Friendly and dangerous signals: is the tissue in control?". Nature Immunology. 8 (1): 11–13. doi:10.1038/ni0107-11. PMID 17179963. S2CID 6448542.
- Matzinger P, Kamala T (2011). "Tissue-based class control: the other side of tolerance". Nature Reviews Immunology. 11 (3): 221–30. doi:10.1038/nri2940. PMID 21350581. S2CID 10809131.
- Perez-Diez Ainhoa; Joncker Nathalie T.; Choi Kyungho; Chan William F. N.; Anderson Colin C.; Lantz Olivier; Matzinger Polly (2007). "CD4 cells can be more efficient at tumor rejection than CD8 cells". Blood. 109 (12): 5346–5354. doi:10.1182/blood-2006-10-051318. PMC 1890845. PMID 17327412.

== Films ==
- Immunity: the inside story. Matzinger P and André Trauneker (1986) (video, 13 min). Award-winning animated film for lay people describing the events involved in clearing an influenza infection. Translated into German, French, Spanish. Hoffmann-La Roche studio, Basel, Switzerland
- A quick look at tissue rejection. Matzinger P. (1991) (Video, 2 min). Animated film for lay people describing the events that result in rejection of a skin graft. Commissioned by the National Association of Science Writers for a meeting of television producers. NIH special events department and Capitol Studios
- Death by Design/The Life and Times of Life and Times. Peter Friedman and Jean-François Brunet (1995) (Film, 73 minutes). Award-winning film on apoptotic cell death that features the work of six scientists. P Matzinger, R Levy-Montalcini, M Raff, P Golstein, KM Debatin, R Horowitz among others
- Turned on by Danger. Michael Mosley (1997) (Film, 60 minutes). A BBC Horizon program made for public television featuring and delineating the Danger model.
- Microbe Invasion. David Green (2001) (Film, 60 minutes). A program describing the interrelationship between human bodies and the multitude of organisms that live on and within them. The film features the Danger model as the model of immunity that best allows for symbiotic relationships within the body. The Learning Channel
