= Mishell–Dutton culture =

In vitro primary antibody response culture system

Mishell–Dutton culture (also called the Mishell–Dutton technique) is an in-vitro primary antibody response system using dissociated mouse spleen cells. First reported in 1966–1967 by Robert I. Mishell and Richard W. Dutton, it enabled reliable in-vitro immunization and enumeration of antibody-forming cells via plaque-forming cell (PFC) assays, facilitating studies of B–T cell cooperation and accessory cell requirements.

== Background ==
The culture's quantitative readout relied on single-cell antibody detection methods: the PFC assay of Jerne and Nordin and later refinements by Cunningham and Szenberg.

== Methods manual ==
A widely used bench manual that compiled many related procedures is Selected Methods in Cellular Immunology (1980), edited by Barbara B. Mishell and Stanley M. Shiigi.

== Impact ==
The system was central to dissecting cellular cooperation in primary antibody responses, including evidence for two-cell requirements and antigen-presenting cell–dependent clustering in vitro. Subsequent optimizations—notably the addition of 2-mercaptoethanol to culture media—further enhanced response magnitude and reproducibility.

== See also ==
- Current Protocols in Immunology
