= Danger model =

Proposed model of immune system

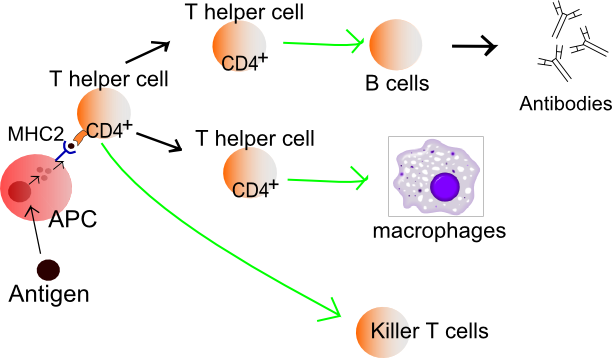
Function of T helper cells: Antigen-presenting cells (APCs) present antigens on their Class II MHC molecules (MHC2). Helper T cells recognize these by expressing the CD4 co-receptor. The activation of a resting helper T cell causes it to release cytokines and other signals (green arrows) that stimulate the activity of macrophages, killer T cells, and B cells, the last of which produces antibodies. The proliferation of Helper T cells stimulates B cells and macrophages.

The danger model of the immune system proposes that it differentiates between components that are capable of causing damage, rather than distinguishing between self and non-self.

== History of immunologic models ==
The first major immunologic model was the Self/Non-self Model proposed by Macfarlane Burnet and Frank Fenner in 1949 with later refinement by Burnet. It theorizes that the immune system distinguishes between self, which is tolerated, and non-self, which is attacked and destroyed. According to this theory, the chief cell of the immune system is the B cell, activated by recognizing non-self structures. Later research showed that B cell activation is reliant on CD4+ T helper cells and a co-stimulatory signal from an antigen-presenting cell (APC). Because APCs are not antigen-specific, capable of processing self structures, Charles Janeway proposed the Infectious Non-self Model in 1989. Janeway's theory involved APCs being activated by pattern recognition receptors (PRRs) that recognize evolutionarily conserved pathogen-associated molecular patterns (PAMPs) as infectious non-self, whereas PRRs are not activated by non-infectious self. However, neither of these models are sufficient to explain non-cytopathic viral infections, graft rejection, or anti-tumor immunity.

== Danger model ==
In 1994, Polly Matzinger formulated the danger model, theorizing that the immune system identifies threats to initiate an immune response based on the presence of pathogens and/or alarm signals from cells under stress. When injured or stressed, tissues typically undergo non-silent types of cell death, such as necrosis or pyroptosis, releasing danger signals like DNA, RNA, heat shock proteins (Hsps), hyaluronic acid, serum amyloid A protein, ATP, uric acid, and cytokines like interferon-α, interleukin-1β, and CD40L for detection by dendritic cells. In comparison, neoplastic tumors do not induce significant immune responses because controlled apoptosis degrades most danger signals, preventing the detection and destruction of malignant cells.

Matzinger's work emphasizes that bodily tissues are the drivers of immunity, providing alarm signals on the location and extent of damage to minimize collateral damage. The adaptive immune system relies on the innate immune system using its antigen-presenting cells to activate B and T lymphocytes for specific antibodies, exemplified by low dendritic cell counts resulting in common variable immunodeficiency (CVID). For example, gut cells secrete transforming growth factor beta (TGF-β) during bacterial invasions to stimulate B cell production of Immunoglobulin A (IgA). Similarly, 30-40% of the liver's T cells are Type I Natural Killer T (NTK) cells, providing Interleukin 4 (IL-4) for an organ-specific response of driving naïve CD4+ T cells to become Type 2 Helper T cells, as opposed to Type 1.

== Damage-associated molecular pattern (DAMP) model ==
Whereas the danger model proposes non-silent cell death releasing intracellular contents and/or expressing unique signalling proteins to stimulate an immune response, the damage-associated molecular pattern (DAMP) model theorizes that the immune system responds to exposed hydrophobic regions of biological molecules. In 2004, Seung-Yong Seong and Matzinger argued that as cellular damage causes denaturing and protein misfolding, exposed hydrophobic regions aggregate into clumps for improved binding to immune receptors.

== Pattern Recognition Receptors (PRRs) ==
Pattern Recognition Receptors (PRRs) are a family of surface receptors on antigen-presenting cells that includes toll-like receptors (TLRs), nucleotide oligomerization domain (NOD)-like receptors, retinoic acid inducible gene-I (RIG-I)-like receptors and C-type lectin-like receptors (CLRs). They recognize alarmins, a category that includes both DAMPs and PAMPs, to process their antigenic regions for presentation to T helper cells.
