= Federica Sallusto =

Italian microbiologist

- Born: 1967 (age 58–59); Naples, Italy
- Scientific career
- Fields: biology, immunology

Federica Sallusto (born 27 November 1961) is an Italian-Swiss biologist and immunologist. After high school, she studied Biology at Sapienza - University of Rome where she graduated cum laude. She earned her PhD in biology in 1988 from the University of Sapienza, followed by two postdoctoral fellowships at the National Italian Institute of Health in Rome, Italy (1989–91) and the Basel Institute of Immunology in Basel, Switzerland (1993–95).

In 1999, Sallusto, alongside David Dombrowicz, was awarded the Pharmacia Allergy Research Foundation Award, which is given annually to researchers under the age of 40 who are working on IgE‐associated disease. In 2009, Sallusto was invited to give the Novartis Behring Lecture, which is a prestigious annual award that is given to an exceptional scientist in the field of virology, immunology or microbiology.

Sallusto was the president of the Swiss Society of Allergology and Immunology from 2013-15. Currently, she is group leader at the Institute for Research in Biomedicine in Bellinzona, Switzerland since 2000, Director of the Center of Medical Immunology and Head of the Cellular Immunology Laboratory at the Institute for Research in Biomedicine (IRB) since 2016, and a professor of Medical Immunology at the Swiss Federal Institute of Technology (ETH) Zurich, Switzerland since 2017. Sallusto is a member of the Scientific Advisory Board at the University of Babel.

== Research ==
Sallusto's research focuses on the role of dendritic cells and T cells in immune system responses, with special attention to the T helper cells Th1, Th2, Th17 and Th22. Her work was the first to characterize antigen-specific memory T cells as "effector memory T cells" (TEM) and "central memory T cells" (TCM).

https://pubmed.ncbi.nlm.nih.gov/?term=Federica+Sallusto
