= CORO1B =

Human actin-binding protein

Identifiers
- Aliases: CORO1B, CORONIN-2, coronin 1B
- External IDs: OMIM: 609849; MGI: 1345963; GeneCards: CORO1B

Gene location (Mouse)
Chr.	Chromosome 19 (mouse)
Band	19 A|19 3.85 cM	Start	4,198,618 bp
Band	19 A|19 3.85 cM	End	4,204,034 bp
RNA expression pattern
Bgee	Human / Mouse (ortholog); Top expressed in: right lobe of thyroid gland; body of stomach; minor salivary glands; right uterine tube; gallbladder; left lobe of thyroid gland; monocyte; spleen; right coronary artery; left uterine tube / Top expressed in: ileum; jejunum; colon; granulocyte; adrenal gland; white adipose tissue; duodenum; thymus; spleen; lip; More reference expression data
BioGPS	n/a
Gene ontology
Molecular function	Arp2/3 complex binding; actin filament binding; protein binding; identical protein binding; actin binding; cadherin binding
Cellular component	cytoplasm; cytosol; focal adhesion; plasma membrane; stress fiber; cell leading edge; actin filament; perinuclear region of cytoplasm; extracellular exosome; cytoskeleton; cell periphery; lamellipodium
Biological process	positive regulation of lamellipodium morphogenesis; ruffle organization; wound healing; actin filament branching; cellular response to platelet-derived growth factor stimulus; regulation of Arp2/3 complex-mediated actin nucleation; negative regulation of Arp2/3 complex-mediated actin nucleation; actin filament bundle assembly; protein localization to cell leading edge; negative regulation of smooth muscle cell chemotaxis; endothelial cell chemotaxis; cell migration; actin cytoskeleton organization; actin filament organization
Sources:Amigo / QuickGO
Orthologs
Databases	NCBI: entry
Species	Human	Mouse
Entrez	57175	23789
Ensembl	n/a	ENSMUSG00000024835
UniProt	Q9BR76	Q9WUM3
RefSeq (mRNA)	NM_020441; NM_001018070	NM_011778
RefSeq (protein)	NP_001018080; NP_065174	NP_035908
Location (UCSC)	n/a	Chr 19: 4.2 – 4.2 Mb
PubMed search
- Wikidata
View/Edit Human	View/Edit Mouse

Coronin, actin binding protein, 1B also known as CORO1B is a protein which in humans is encoded by the CORO1B gene. Members of the coronin family, such as CORO1B, are WD repeat-containing actin-binding proteins that regulate cell motility.

== Function ==
A mammalian coronin enriches at the leading edge of migrating cells. Studies related to this protein are as follows:

- Coronin 1B antagonizes cortactin and remodels Arp2/3-containing actin branches in lamellipodia.
- F-actin binding is essential for coronin 1B function in vivo.
- Coronin 1B coordinates Arp2/3 complex and cofilin activities at the leading edge.
- Phosphorylation of coronin 1B by protein kinase C regulates interaction with Arp2/3 and cell motility.
- In vivo and in vitro characterization of novel neuronal plasticity factors identified following spinal cord injury.
- Isolation, cloning, and characterization of a new mammalian coronin family member, coroninse, which is regulated within the protein kinase C signaling pathway.
