= Herman Waldmann =

British immunologist (born 1945)

Herman Waldmann FRS FMedSci (born 27 February 1945) is a British immunologist and Emeritus Professor of Pathology at the University of Oxford. He is known for his work on regulatory T cells and immunological tolerance, and for pioneering the therapeutic use of monoclonal antibodies, in particular Campath-1 (alemtuzumab), used in the treatment of chronic lymphocytic leukaemia and multiple sclerosis. He established that immunological tolerance can be a self-propagating process amenable to clinical application, enabling long-term clinical benefit from short-term treatment. He has authored more than 550 scientific publications.

== Early life and education ==
Waldmann grew up in north-east London, and was a student at Sir George Monoux Grammar School, Walthamstow, and Sidney Sussex College, Cambridge, where he obtained a BA in Natural Sciences (Class I, 1966), MB BChir with distinction in Pharmacology and Therapeutics (1970), a PhD (1974), and an MA (1977).

== Career ==
Waldmann held a series of posts at Cambridge, including Demonstrator and University Lecturer in the Department of Pathology, Research Fellow and later Fellow of King's College, Cambridge. In 1978–79 he was a visiting scientist with César Milstein at the Laboratory of Molecular Biology, Cambridge. In 1989 he was appointed the first Kay Kendall Professor of Therapeutic Immunology at Cambridge.

In 1994 he moved to the University of Oxford, where he served as Director of the Therapeutic Antibody Centre (1994–2008) and Head of the Sir William Dunn School of Pathology (1994–2012). He is now Emeritus Professor of Pathology at Oxford. The Therapeutic Antibody Centre was co-established with his colleague Geoffrey Hale.

== Research ==
In 1979, while at the University of Cambridge, Waldmann's group raised a series of rat monoclonal antibodies against human lymphocytes, known as the Campath series (from "Cambridge Pathology"). One of these, Campath-1, was found to deplete T cells via complement activation while sparing bone marrow stem cells, and was subsequently used to prevent graft-versus-host disease in bone marrow transplantation. Working with Greg Winter from 1988, Waldmann helped pioneer the humanisation of therapeutic antibodies, leading to Campath-1H. This antibody was later developed as alemtuzumab (Lemtrada), used in the treatment of chronic lymphocytic leukaemia and multiple sclerosis.

In 1985, Waldmann's group showed that short courses of CD4 antibody therapy could induce long-term immunological tolerance to foreign proteins in rodents, providing the first evidence that transient antibody treatment could "reprogramme" the immune system. This led to a 1993 paper in Science identifying a role for regulatory T cells in "infectious tolerance", whereby tolerance induced in one population of T cells can be transferred to naïve T cells.

To translate these findings clinically, Waldmann together with his colleague Geoffrey Hale co-established the first academic antibody manufacturing facility, enabling his laboratory to develop a series of humanised therapeutic antibodies against CD52, CD3 and CD4, several of which were later transferred to the pharmaceutical industry. His humanised anti-CD3 antibody, otelixizumab, was developed alongside the related antibody teplizumab and tested in clinical trials for type 1 diabetes.

== Awards and honours ==
- 1990: Fellow of the Royal Society (FRS)
- 1992: Fellow of the Royal College of Pathologists (FRCPath)
- 1998: Founding Fellow of the Academy of Medical Sciences (FMedSci)
- 2005: Jose Carreras Award, European Hematology Association
- 2005: JDRF Excellence in Clinical Research Award
- 2007: Thomas E. Starzl Prize in Surgery and Immunology
- 2007: Scrip Lifetime Achievement Award
- 2008: Honorary ScD, University of Cambridge
- 2010: Fellow of the Royal College of Physicians (FRCP)
- 2017: Honorary Life Membership, British Society of Immunology
- 2023: Royal Medal (Biology), Royal Society
