= Harald von Boehmer =

German-Swiss immunologist

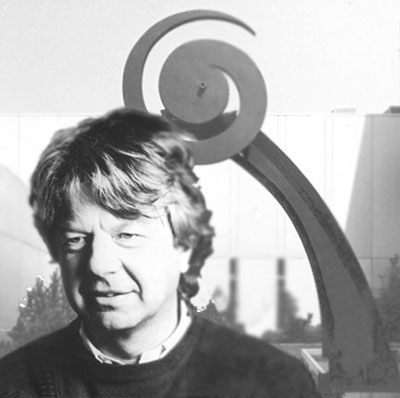
- Born: November 30, 1942; Guben, Germany
- Died: June 24, 2018 (aged 75)
- Occupation: Immunologist
- Awards: Louis-Jeantet Prize for Medicine (1990)

Harald von Boehmer (30 November 1942 – 24 June 2018) was a German-Swiss immunologist and author best known for his work on T cells.

== Career ==
The youngest of Hasso von Boehmer's three children, von Boehmer obtained an M.D. from LMU Munich (1968) and a Ph.D. from Melbourne University, Australia (1974). He was a member of the Basel Institute for Immunology in Switzerland (1973–1996), director of Unité INSERM 373 at the René Descartes University in Paris, France and is Professor of Pathology at Harvard Medical School and the Faculty of Arts and Sciences of Harvard University, Cambridge and Chief of the Laboratory for Lymphocyte Biology at the Dana Farber Cancer Institute in Boston. He was an adjunct professor at the University of Florida.

Von Boehmer studied the role of T lymphocytes in the immune system. In particular, he addressed the contribution of the T cell receptor (TCR) to recognition by T cells of peptide-MHC complexes by transfer of TCR alpha and beta genes from one T cell clone to another. Questions concerned with the role of positive and negative selection of developing T cells by peptide-MHC complexes in the thymus in generating an effective and self-tolerant immune system were analyzed in TCR transgenic mice. The same experimental system served the purpose to study the impact of TCR-ligation on developing T cells by MHC class I and MHC class II ligands on the intrathymic generation of CD8 killer and CD4 helper cells, respectively. Further studies were concerned with the structure and function of the pre-T cell receptor and its role in controlling survival and differentiation of developing T cells that have succeeded in productive TCR beta rearrangement. Harald von Boehmer studied the generation and function of regulatory T cells that have an essential role in preventing autoimmunity with the goal to exploit these cells in the prevention of and interference with unwanted immune reactions.

Harald von Boehmer was elected as a Senior Member of the Institut Universitaire de France (1997), was awarded the Louis-Jeantet Prize for Medicine jointly with Nicole Le Douarin and Gottfried Schatz in Geneva (1990) and received an honorary Medical Degree from the University of Technology, Munich (2002).

Harald von Boehmer retired at the end of 2012 and was a guest professor at the Institute for Immunology of LMU Munich beginning January 2013.

In February 2013 Harald von Boehmer, MD, PhD, Professor of Microbiology and Immunology at the Department of Cancer Immunology & AIDS, Harvard Medical School (USA), did receive the Helmholtz International Fellow Award for having excelled in the field of Immunology.

Von Boehmer died on June 24, 2018, at the age of 75.

== Awards ==
- 1990 Louis Jeantet Prize for Medicine (Geneva)
- 1990 Elected member of the Academia Europaea (London)
- 1990 Avery-Landsteiner-Prize of the German society for immunology (Aachen)
- 1993 Paul Ehrlich and Ludwig Darmstaedter Prize (Frankfurt)
- 1997 Körber European Science Prize (Hamburg)
- 1997 Elected member of the Institut Universitaire de France
- 2002 Honorary doctor in Medical degree of the Technical University of Munich
- 2003 Elected member of the German Academy of Sciences Leopoldina (Halle)
- 2003 National Institutes of Health NIH Merit Award (Washington D.C.)
- 2004 Sherman Fairchild Foundation award
- 2013 Helmholtz International Fellow Award

== Selected publications ==
Selected papers:

- Bone marrow chimeras and transplantation tolerance
  von Boehmer, H.; Sprent, J.; Nabholz, M. (1975). "Tolerance to histocompatibility determinants in tetraparental bone marrow chimeras." Journal of Experimental Medicine. 141 (2): 322–334. doi:10.1084/jem.141.2.322. PMC 2190519.
  This work contributed to the development of allogeneic bone marrow transplantation strategies using T-cell removal.
- MHC restriction and T-cell recognition
  von Boehmer, H.; Hudson, L.; Sprent, J. (1975). "Collaboration of histoincompatible T and B lymphocytes using cells from tetraparental bone marrow chimeras." Journal of Experimental Medicine. 142 (4): 989–997. doi:10.1084/jem.142.4.989. PMID 51901.
  von Boehmer, H.; Haas, W. (1976). "Cytotoxic T lymphocytes recognize allogeneic tolerated, TNP-conjugated cells." Nature. 261: 141–143.
  These studies helped define how T cells recognize antigens in the context of MHC molecules.
- T-cell receptor specificity
  Dembić, Z.; Haas, W.; Weiss, S.; McCubrey, J.; Kiefer, H.; von Boehmer, H.; Steinmetz, M. (1986). "Transfer of specificity by murine alpha and beta T-cell receptor genes." Nature. 320 (6059): 232–238. doi:10.1038/320232a0. PMID 2421164.
  This paper showed that alpha and beta T-cell receptor genes could transfer antigen specificity.
- Central tolerance and thymocyte deletion
  Kisielow, P.; Blüthmann, H.; Staerz, U. D.; Steinmetz, M.; von Boehmer, H. (1988). "Tolerance in T-cell-receptor transgenic mice involves deletion of nonmature CD4+8+ thymocytes." Nature. 333 (6175): 742–746. doi:10.1038/333742a0.
  Swat, W.; Ignatowicz, L.; von Boehmer, H.; Kisielow, P. (1991). "Clonal deletion of immature CD4+8+ thymocytes in suspension culture by extrathymic antigen-presenting cells." Nature. 351: 150–153. doi:10.1038/351150a0. PMID 1903182.
  These studies demonstrated central tolerance through deletion of immature T cells in T-cell receptor transgenic systems.
- Positive selection and CD4/CD8 lineage choice
  Teh, H. S.; Kisielow, P.; Scott, B.; Kishi, H.; Uematsu, Y.; Blüthmann, H.; von Boehmer, H. (1988). "Thymic major histocompatibility complex antigens and the alpha beta T-cell receptor determine the CD4/CD8 phenotype of T cells." Nature. 335 (6187): 229–233. doi:10.1038/335229a0. PMID 2970593.
  Scott, B.; Blüthmann, H.; Teh, H. S.; von Boehmer, H. (1989). "The generation of mature T cells requires interaction of the alpha beta T-cell receptor with major histocompatibility antigens." Nature. 338 (6216): 591–593. doi:10.1038/338591a0. PMID 2784545.
  These studies helped establish the role of T-cell receptor interactions with MHC molecules in positive selection and CD4/CD8 lineage determination.
- Peripheral selection of the T-cell repertoire
  Rocha, B.; von Boehmer, H. (1991). "Peripheral selection of the T cell repertoire." Science. 251 (4998): 1225–1228. doi:10.1126/science.1900951. PMID 1900951.
  This paper addressed peripheral tolerance through deletion and reversible anergy in mature T cells.
- T-cell receptor allelic exclusion
  Borgulya, P.; Kishi, H.; Uematsu, Y.; von Boehmer, H. (1992). "Exclusion and inclusion of alpha and beta T cell receptor alleles." Cell. 69 (3): 529–537. doi:10.1016/0092-8674(92)90453-J. PMID 1316241.
  Aifantis, I.; Buer, J.; von Boehmer, H.; Azogui, O. (1997). "Essential role of the pre-T cell receptor in allelic exclusion of the T cell receptor beta locus." Immunity. 7 (5): 601–607. doi:10.1016/S1074-7613(00)80381-7. PMID 9390684.
  These papers examined allelic exclusion at the T-cell receptor loci, including the role of the pre-T-cell receptor in TCR-beta allelic exclusion.
- T-cell memory
  Bruno, L.; Kirberg, J.; von Boehmer, H. (1995). "On the cellular basis of immunological T cell memory." Immunity. 2 (1): 37–43. doi:10.1016/1074-7613(95)90077-2. PMID 7600301.
  This study characterized memory T cells as phenotypically and functionally distinct from naive T cells.
- Discovery and function of the pre-T-cell receptor
  Groettrup, M.; Ungewiss, K.; Azogui, O.; Palacios, R.; Owen, M. J.; Hayday, A. C.; von Boehmer, H. (1993). "A novel disulfide-linked heterodimer on pre-T cells consists of the T cell receptor beta chain and a 33 kd glycoprotein." Cell. 75 (2): 283–294. doi:10.1016/0092-8674(93)80070-U. PMID 8402912.
  Saint-Ruf, C.; Ungewiss, K.; Groettrup, M.; Bruno, L.; Fehling, H. J.; von Boehmer, H. (1994). "Analysis and expression of a cloned pre-T cell receptor gene." Science. 266 (5188): 1208–1212. doi:10.1126/science.7973703. PMID 7973703.
  Fehling, H. J.; Krotkova, A.; Saint-Ruf, C.; von Boehmer, H. (1995). "Crucial role of the pre-T-cell receptor alpha gene in development of alpha beta but not gamma delta T cells." Nature. 375: 795–798. doi:10.1038/375795a0. PMID 7596413.
  These studies identified, cloned, and tested the developmental role of the pre-T-cell receptor.
- Regulatory T cells and Foxp3
  Apostolou, I.; Sarukhan, A.; Klein, L.; von Boehmer, H. (2002). "Origin of regulatory T cells with known specificity for antigen." Nature Immunology. 3 (8): 756–763. doi:10.1038/ni816. PMID 12089509.
  Kretschmer, K.; Apostolou, I.; Hawiger, D.; Khazaie, K.; Nussenzweig, M. C.; von Boehmer, H. (2005). "Inducing and expanding regulatory T cell populations by foreign antigen." Nature Immunology. 6 (12): 1219–1227. doi:10.1038/ni1265. PMID 16244650.
  Marson, A.; Kretschmer, K.; Frampton, G. M.; Jacobsen, E. S.; Polansky, J. K.; MacIsaac, K. D.; Levine, S. S.; Fraenkel, E.; von Boehmer, H.; Young, R. A. (2007). "Foxp3 occupancy and regulation of key target genes during T-cell stimulation." Nature. 445: 931–935. doi:10.1038/nature05478. PMID 17237765.
  These papers addressed antigen-dependent generation of regulatory T cells and Foxp3-dependent gene regulation.
