= CORO1A =

Protein-coding gene in the species Homo sapiens

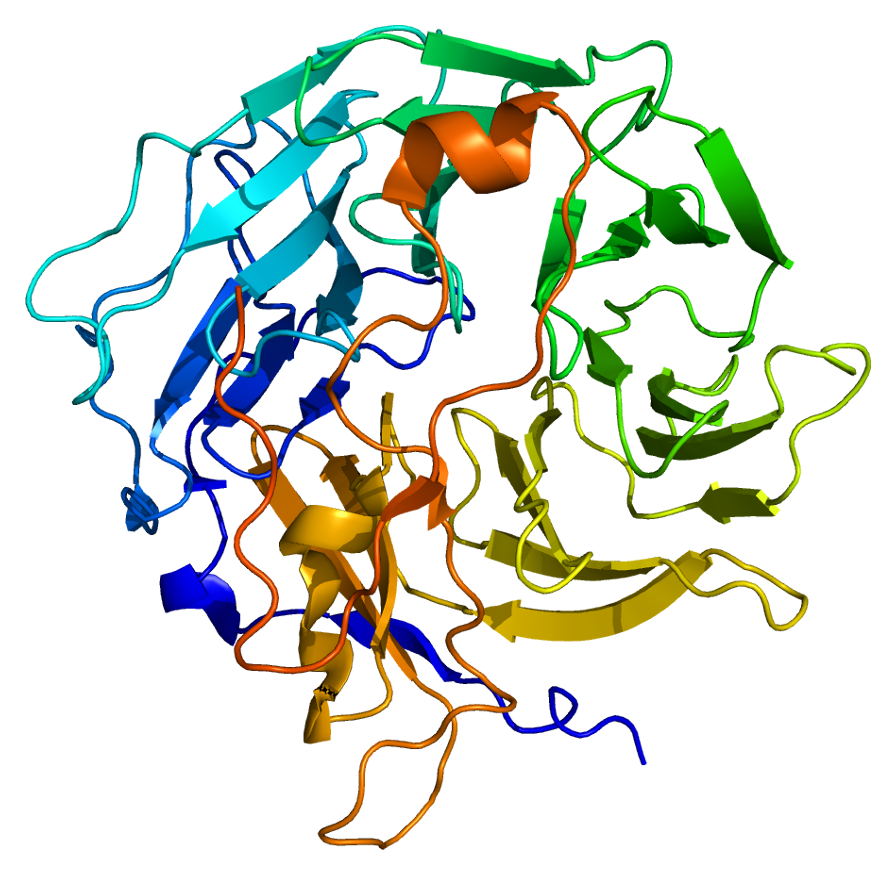

Identifiers
- Aliases: CORO1A, CLABP, CLIPINA, HCORO1, IMD8, TACO, p57, coronin 1A
- External IDs: OMIM: 605000; MGI: 1345961; GeneCards: CORO1A
Available structures
PDB	Ortholog search: PDBe RCSB
PDB	List of PDB id codes 2AKF, 2AQ5, 2B4E

Gene location (Human)
Chr.	Chromosome 16 (human)
Band	16p11.2	Start	30,182,827 bp
Band	16p11.2	End	30,189,076 bp

Gene location (Mouse)
Chr.	Chromosome 7 (mouse)
Band	7 69.25 cM|7 F3	Start	126,298,945 bp
Band	7 69.25 cM|7 F3	End	126,306,959 bp
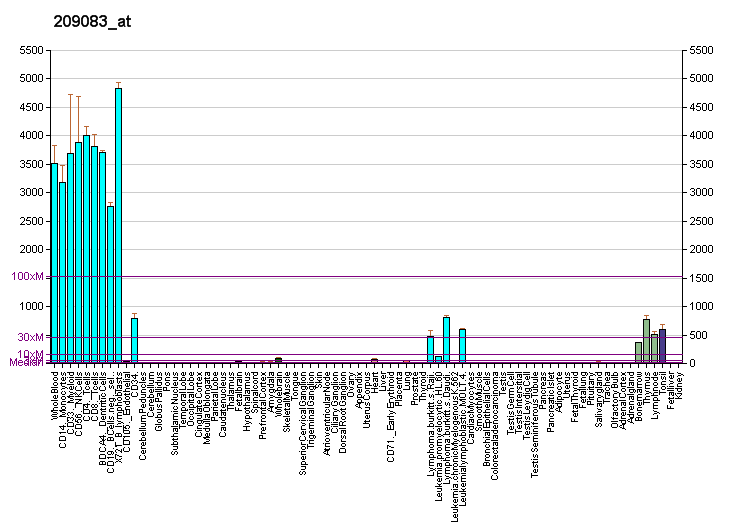
RNA expression pattern
Bgee	Human / Mouse (ortholog); Top expressed in: granulocyte; monocyte; blood; spleen; appendix; bone marrow; bone marrow cell; lymph node; trabecular bone; thymus / Top expressed in: granulocyte; mesenteric lymph nodes; thymus; spleen; tibiofemoral joint; blood; bone marrow; right lung lobe; dentate gyrus of hippocampal formation granule cell; prefrontal cortex; More reference expression data
BioGPS	More reference expression data
Gene ontology
Molecular function	protein binding; protein C-terminus binding; identical protein binding; phosphatidylinositol 3-kinase binding; protein homodimerization activity; actin monomer binding; myosin heavy chain binding; cytoskeletal protein binding; actin filament binding; actin binding
Cellular component	phagocytic cup; extracellular exosome; cytoplasm; actin cytoskeleton; cell cortex; nucleus; cell leading edge; axon; lamellipodium; cortical actin cytoskeleton; early endosome; cell-cell junction; membrane; actin filament; phagocytic vesicle membrane; plasma membrane; cytoplasmic vesicle; immunological synapse; cytoskeleton; phagocytic vesicle; cytosol
Biological process	negative regulation of vesicle fusion; calcium ion transport; homeostasis of number of cells within a tissue; negative regulation of actin nucleation; phagocytosis; response to cytokine; nerve growth factor signaling pathway; T cell homeostasis; positive regulation of cell migration; regulation of actin cytoskeleton organization; positive chemotaxis; actin filament organization; positive regulation of T cell proliferation; cellular response to interleukin-4; natural killer cell degranulation; regulation of release of sequestered calcium ion into cytosol; regulation of actin polymerization or depolymerization; cell-substrate adhesion; regulation of actin filament polymerization; negative regulation of neuron apoptotic process; positive regulation of T cell activation; regulation of cell shape; innate immune response; early endosome to recycling endosome transport; cell migration; actin cytoskeleton organization; uropod organization; immunological synapse formation; leukocyte chemotaxis; phagolysosome assembly
Sources:Amigo / QuickGO
Orthologs
Databases	NCBI: entry; OMA: entry
Species	Human	Mouse
Entrez	11151	12721
Ensembl	ENSG00000102879	ENSMUSG00000030707
UniProt	P31146	O89053
RefSeq (mRNA)	NM_001193333; NM_007074	NM_001301374; NM_009898
RefSeq (protein)	NP_001180262; NP_009005	NP_001288303; NP_034028
Location (UCSC)	Chr 16: 30.18 – 30.19 Mb	Chr 7: 126.3 – 126.31 Mb
PubMed search
- Wikidata
View/Edit Human	View/Edit Mouse

Coronin-1A is a protein that in humans is encoded by the CORO1A gene. It has been implicated in both T-cell mediated immunity and mitochondrial apoptosis. In a recent genome-wide longevity study, its expression levels were found to be negatively associated both with age at the time of blood sample and the survival time after blood draw.

== Discovery ==
The coronin protein family was discovered in 1991 by Eugenio L. Hostos. Hostos used a cytoskeletal preparation called the “contracted propeller” that efficiently helped with the purification of cytoskeletal proteins. This technique allowed him to precipitate actomyosin components together with the desired proteins.

These protein were named Corona, which is the Latin word for crown, because of the crown-like shape that it forms when making contact with the surface of the cell. Coronin-1a has been the most researched one due to its complexity and intriguing structural components. After research, it was determined that coronin-1a serves as actin binding facilitator when reacted with K-glutamate. The anion K + and glutamate were used because of it similarity to the environment inside the cell, allowing coronin-1a to bind to F-actin.

Later on, the complementary DNA (cDNA) of coronin-1a was cloned in an expression library, this led to the conclusion that coronin-1a has very similar structure to the beta (β) subunits of the G proteins (Gβ). Therefore, it was established that coronin-1a has five WD motif repeats, and this repeats seven times forming a propeller like structure.

In the cell, coronin-1a serves as an auxiliary to many cytoskeletal process that involve actin. It was concluded that coronin-1a is known to affect the “cytoskeletal reorganization” as well “actin dynamics” together with other protein.

=== Phylogeny ===
The coronin family is composed of twelve subfamilies which include: seven subfamilies that fall under vertebrates and five subfamilies that are composed of metazoans, fungi and amoeba.

The evolutionary coronin subfamilies have been grouped by its similarities and relationships between the different proteins. Coronin-1a (also referenced as CORO1A, Coronin 4 and CRN4) has been found in 19 vertebrates.

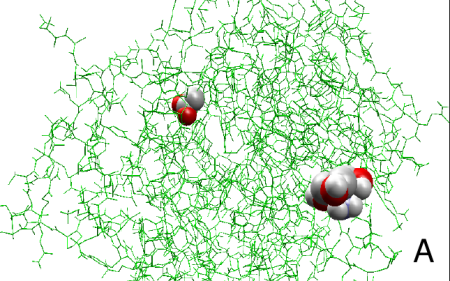
TgCor complexed with2-amino-2-hydroxymethyl-promane-1,3-diolmade

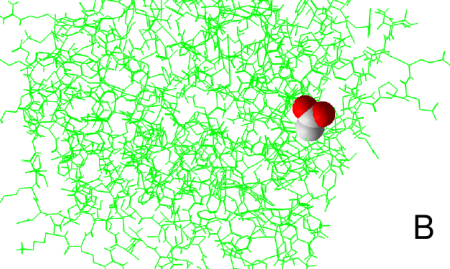
TgCor complexed with 2-amino-2-hydroxymethyl-promane-1,3-diol

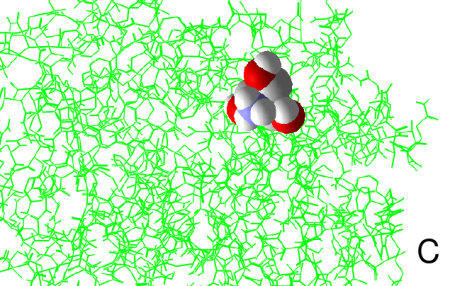
TgCor complexed with acetate anion

Coronin-1a has been found in the cell cortex of macrophages, which are white blood cells, helping with a process called phagocytosis. The model on Figure 3 shows coronin-1a's involvement in macrophages. When the cell is at rest, Coronin-1a is spread out throughout the cytoplasm and the cell cortex. Therefore, when a pathogen enters the cell, Coronin-1a binds to phagosomal membrane making sure of the binding and activation of calcineurin, this resulting in a stop of fusion lysosomes with phagosomes. In other words, if coronin-1a is removed and calcineurin is inhibited then it allows the initiation of the fusion of phagosomes with lysosome and the killing of mycobacteria.

The phylogenetic tree of the coronin family it is broad. The same way that coronin-1a helps with the reorganization of the cytoskeleton and dynamic activity with other proteins in vertebrates, Coronin can also be seen in non-vertebrates, for example in Toxoplasma gondii (also known as TgCor).

Toxoplasma gondii coronin (TgCor) binds to F-actin and it accelerates the actin polymerization process. It also prevents incursions and exits. As well as every other coronin, TgCor is an actin binding protein, it delocalizes to the posterior side of invading parasites and blocks them from leaving.

== Structure ==
The structure of coronin-1A is made out of five WD repeats, and this motifs repeat seven time forming a propeller like structures.

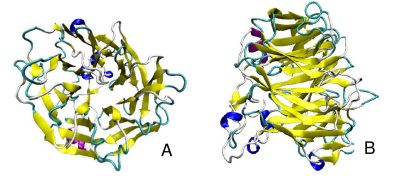
VMD secondary structure

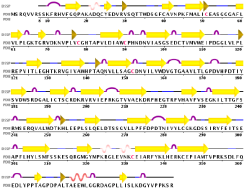
DSSP secondary structure

The new ribbon visualization of the secondary structure of coronin-1a. In model A, is the front view of coronin-1a, the secondary structure allows you to clearly see the parallel beta sheets moving towards the bottom of the structure. Model B, is the side view of the protein which shows the turns and the coils between the beta sheets. From this pictures we are able to see that the alpha helix and helix strands are concentrated at the bottom of the protein.

Coronin-1a was input into Database of Secondary Structure Program, where the Protein Data Bank database entered and a secondary structure panel is designed where one is clearly able to see the seven repeat that makes the propeller. Also, it displays the amino acid sequence of coronin-1a. The yellow arrows mean the beta strands, the purple loops are the turns, the black lines means empty meaning that there was no secondary structure assigned, the light pink is 3/10-helix is formed, royal blue line is a bend and finally the red helix signifies the alpha helices.
