= CORO2A =

Protein-coding gene in the species Homo sapiens

Identifiers
- Aliases: CORO2A, CLIPINB, IR10, WDR2, coronin 2A
- External IDs: OMIM: 602159; MGI: 1345966; GeneCards: CORO2A

Gene location (Human)
Chr.	Chromosome 9 (human)
Band	9q22.33	Start	98,120,975 bp
Band	9q22.33	End	98,192,637 bp

Gene location (Mouse)
Chr.	Chromosome 4 (mouse)
Band	4|4 B1	Start	46,536,937 bp
Band	4|4 B1	End	46,602,202 bp
RNA expression pattern
Bgee	Human / Mouse (ortholog); Top expressed in: jejunal mucosa; duodenum; mucosa of transverse colon; gallbladder; human penis; bronchial epithelial cell; rectum; spinal ganglia; mucosa of pharynx; mucosa of sigmoid colon / Top expressed in: seminal vesicula; epithelium of small intestine; intestinal villus; ileum; colon; lumbar spinal ganglion; mucous cell of stomach; left colon; jejunum; spermatid; More reference expression data
BioGPS	n/a
Gene ontology
Molecular function	actin binding; actin filament binding; protein binding
Cellular component	actin cytoskeleton; transcription repressor complex; intracellular anatomical structure
Biological process	actin cytoskeleton organization; intracellular signal transduction
Sources:Amigo / QuickGO
Orthologs
Databases	NCBI: entry; OMA: entry
Species	Human	Mouse
Entrez	7464	107684
Ensembl	ENSG00000106789	ENSMUSG00000028337
UniProt	Q92828	Q8C0P5
RefSeq (mRNA)	NM_003389; NM_052820	NM_001164804; NM_178893
RefSeq (protein)	NP_003380; NP_438171	NP_001158276; NP_849224
Location (UCSC)	Chr 9: 98.12 – 98.19 Mb	Chr 4: 46.54 – 46.6 Mb
PubMed search
- Wikidata
View/Edit Human	View/Edit Mouse

Coronin, actin binding protein, 2A is a protein that in humans is encoded by the CORO2A gene.

This gene encodes a member of the WD repeat protein family. WD repeats are minimally conserved regions of approximately 40 amino acids typically bracketed by gly-his and trp-asp (GH-WD), which may facilitate formation of heterotrimeric or multiprotein complexes. Members of this family are involved in a variety of cellular processes, including cell cycle progression, signal transduction, apoptosis, and gene regulation. This protein contains 5 WD repeats, and has a structural similarity with actin-binding proteins: the D. discoideum coronin and the human p57 protein, suggesting that this protein may also be an actin-binding protein that regulates cell motility. Alternative splicing of this gene generates 2 transcript variants. [provided by RefSeq, Jul 2008].
