= CORO1C =

Protein-coding gene in humans

Identifiers
- Aliases: CORO1C, HCRNN4, coronin 1C
- External IDs: OMIM: 605269; MGI: 1345964; GeneCards: CORO1C

Gene location (Human)
Chr.	Chromosome 12 (human)
Band	12q24.11	Start	108,645,109 bp
Band	12q24.11	End	108,731,526 bp

Gene location (Mouse)
Chr.	Chromosome 5 (mouse)
Band	5|5 F	Start	113,980,497 bp
Band	5|5 F	End	114,046,819 bp
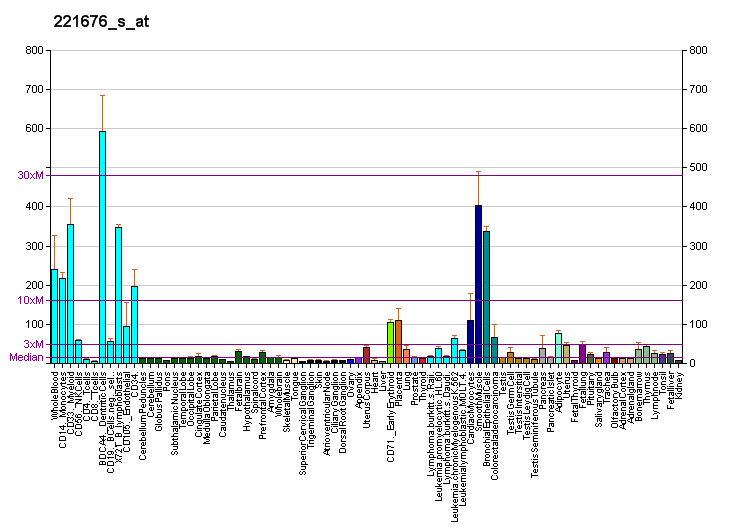
RNA expression pattern
Bgee	Human / Mouse (ortholog); Top expressed in: saphenous vein; tendon of biceps brachii; ganglionic eminence; synovial joint; Achilles tendon; stromal cell of endometrium; epithelium of colon; urethra; popliteal artery; tibial arteries / Top expressed in: stroma of bone marrow; corneal stroma; ventricular zone; yolk sac; somite; ileum; epiblast; intestinal villus; ganglionic eminence; crypt of lieberkuhn of small intestine; More reference expression data
BioGPS	More reference expression data
Gene ontology
Molecular function	actin filament binding; protein binding; actin binding
Cellular component	cytoplasm; vesicle; cell projection; lateral plasma membrane; membrane; focal adhesion; plasma membrane; flotillin complex; actin cytoskeleton; cytoskeleton; lamellipodium
Biological process	regulation of protein phosphorylation; negative regulation of protein phosphorylation; positive regulation of lamellipodium morphogenesis; activation of GTPase activity; establishment of protein localization; regulation of epithelial cell migration; neural crest cell migration; negative regulation of protein kinase activity by regulation of protein phosphorylation; phagocytosis; regulation of focal adhesion assembly; regulation of ruffle assembly; negative regulation of substrate adhesion-dependent cell spreading; regulation of fibroblast migration; regulation of substrate adhesion-dependent cell spreading; negative regulation of focal adhesion assembly; negative regulation of epithelial cell migration; actin cytoskeleton organization; signal transduction
Sources:Amigo / QuickGO
Orthologs
Databases	NCBI: entry; OMA: entry
Species	Human	Mouse
Entrez	23603	23790
Ensembl	ENSG00000110880	ENSMUSG00000004530
UniProt	Q9ULV4	Q9WUM4
RefSeq (mRNA)	NM_001105237; NM_001276471; NM_014325	NM_011779
RefSeq (protein)	NP_001098707; NP_001263400; NP_055140	NP_035909
Location (UCSC)	Chr 12: 108.65 – 108.73 Mb	Chr 5: 113.98 – 114.05 Mb
PubMed search
- Wikidata
View/Edit Human	View/Edit Mouse

Coronin-1C is a protein that in humans is encoded by the CORO1C gene.

This gene encodes a member of the WD repeat protein family. WD repeats are minimally conserved regions of approximately 40 amino acids typically bracketed by gly-his and trp-asp (GH-WD), which may facilitate formation of heterotrimeric or multiprotein complexes. Members of this family are involved in a variety of cellular processes, including cell cycle progression, signal transduction, apoptosis, and gene regulation.
