= Konkuk University =

University in South Korea

- Emblem of Konkuk University
- Other name: KU
- Motto in English: Sincerity (성, 誠), Fidelity (신, 信), Righteousness (의, 義)
- Type: Private research university
- Established: 1931; 95 years ago
- Chairperson: Yoo Ja-eun (유자은)
- President: Won Jong-pil (원종필)
- Director: 7 (incl. chairperson): Choi Hongkon, Choi Gapshik, Cho Younsoon, Jin Choon Jo, Kim Jin Eok, Jun Hong Moo
- Faculty: 1,200 full-time faculty, 1,300 part-time faculty and international 70
- Administrative staff: 500
- Students: 29,600
- Other students: 2,500 international students
- Location: Seoul, South Korea; 37°32′31″N 127°04′35″E
- Campus: Urban
- Colors: Green
- Mascots: KonWoo & KonHee (Bull)
- Website: konkuk.ac.kr
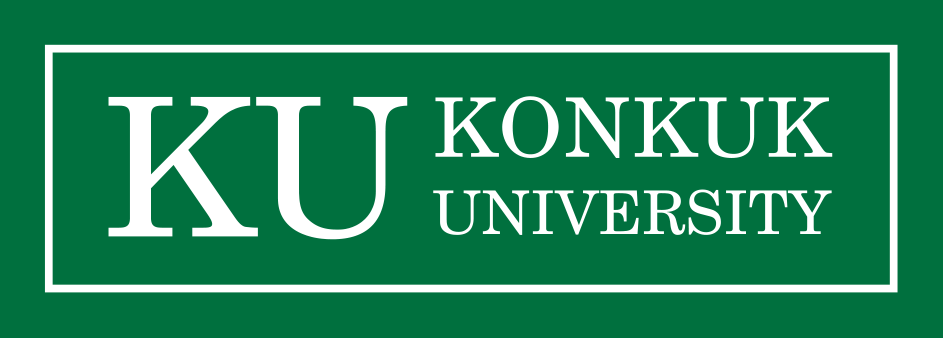

Korean name
- Hangul: 건국대학교
- Hanja: 建國大學校
- RR: Geonguk daehakgyo
- MR: Kŏn'guk taehakkyo

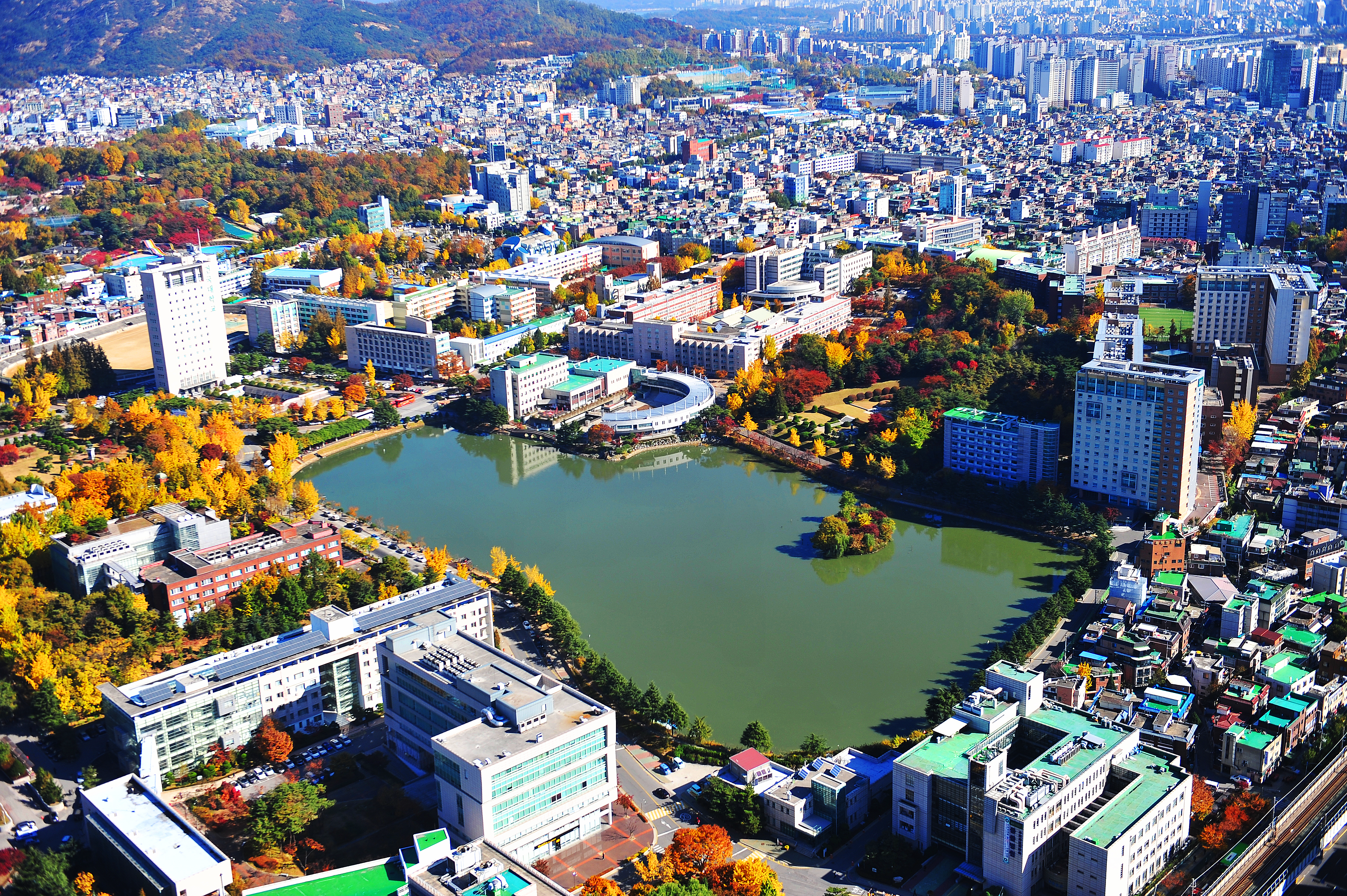
The Seoul Campus in the fall, with Ilgam Lake

Konkuk University (Korean: 건국대학교) is a private research university founded in South Korea in 1931.

Konkuk University is known for its veterinary and art colleges at the Seoul campus. It has two campuses: one in Seoul and one in Chungju. The Seoul campus is located near the Han River, by the Konkuk University Station (subway line number 2 and number 7).

== History ==
The university was founded in 1931 by Dr. Yoo Seok-chang (pen name: Sanghuh). It was originally known as the Chosen School of Politics (Korean: 조선정치학관; Hanja: 朝鮮政治學館), and was a junior college for future political leaders. In 1959, the school became a "comprehensive university" and was renamed to Konkuk University (from 건국; 建國; Konkuk; lit. ''founding a nation'').

In 2016, Konkuk University celebrated its 70th anniversary. A new emblem featuring Sanghuh Hall, the original building for the Chosun School of Politics, was released in December 2015. The university also unveiled a second ox statue and held a major academic symposium.

In 2017, Konkuk University was selected for the Leaders in Industry-University Cooperation (LINC+) project by the Ministry of Education and the National Research Foundation of Korea and has been accredited by the Korean University Accreditation Institute (KUAI), of the Korean Council for University Education, for two consecutive periods.

== Administration and organization ==
Yoo served as the first president of Konkuk University from 1959 to 1961. In September 2016, Sanggi Min became the university's 20th president. The university has four executive vice presidents: provost and executive vice president for academic affairs, executive vice president for public affairs, executive vice president for research, and executive vice president for medicine. The board of the Konkuk University Foundation, which governs the university, includes Chairperson Ja-eun Yoo and eleven other board members who each serve 4-year terms.

== Academics ==
=== Undergraduate and graduate programs ===
The Seoul campus is composed of thirteen undergraduate colleges and thirteen graduate schools; the GLOCAL Campus in Chungju is composed of seven undergraduate colleges and four graduate schools.

Konkuk University was ranked as 8th best university in South Korea in 2026. The university was ranked at 7th in 2022 and consistently within the top 10 past few years.

Campus	Undergraduate	Graduate
Seoul Campus	College of Liberal Arts; College of Science; College of Architecture; College of Engineering; College of Humanities and Social Sciences; College of Business Administration; College of Veterinary Medicine; College of Art and Design; College of Education; Institute of Real Estate Science; Institute of Convergence Science and Technology; Sanghuh College of Life Sciences; Sanghuh College of Liberal Arts	Graduate School (general); Graduate School of Architecture; Graduate School of Law; College of Engineering; Graduate School of Business Administration; Graduate School of Public Administration; Graduate School of Education; Graduate School of Industry; Graduate School of Agriculture; Graduate School of Journalism and Public Relations; Graduate School of Information and Communication; Graduate School of Art and Design; Graduate School of Real Estate; Graduate School of Veterinary Epidemic Prevention
Chungju GLOCAL Campus	College of Art and Design; College of Humanities and Social Sciences Convergence; College of Science and Technology; College of Medical Life Sciences; College of Medicine; College of Liberal Arts; College of Innovation Sharing	Graduate School (general); Graduate School of Medicine; Graduate School of Creative Convergence; Graduate School of Education

=== Research institutes ===
Konkuk University has 58 affiliated and special research institutes in the areas of humanities, social sciences, and natural sciences.

- Architectural Barrier-free Institute
- Artificial Muscle Research Center
- Asia Infrastructure Research Center
- Bio Food & Drug Research Center
- Bio/Molecular Informatics Center
- Cancer and Metabolism Institute
- Center for Animal Resources
- Center for Eco-Informatics
- Center for Emerging Market Global Companies
- Center for IT Enabled Outsourcing
- Center for SMART Space Technology Research
- Center for Story & Image Telling Studies
- Center for Wireless Transmission Technology
- Climate Research Institute
- Eco-Food Supply Institute
- Eco-friendly Agriculture Products Certification Center
- Epic and Literary Therapy Research Institute
- Fairy Tales & Translation
- Flexible Display Roll To Roll Research Center
- Food Safety & Animal Health Research Center at Konkuk University, FSRCKU
- Functional Glycoside Conjugater Research Center
- Future Energy Research Center
- Global & Local Research Institute
- Glocal Institute for SMART Communication and Consilience
- Glocal Institute of Disease Control
- Humanities Research Institute
- i-Fashion Technology Center
- Institute for Advanced Physics
- Institute for Comparative History of Korea and Taiwan
- Institute for Conservation of Art
- Institute for Smart Green Architecture and Urbanism
- Institute for Ubiquitous Information Technology and Applications
- Institute of Biomedical and Health Science
- Institute of Body & Culture
- Institute of Functional Genomics
- Institute of Glocal Disease Control
- Institute of Inflammatory Diseases
- Institute of Intelligent Vehicle and System Technology
- Institute of Korean Politics and Society
- Institute of Livestock Business Management
- Institute of Public Affairs
- Institute of Real Estate & Urban Studies
- Institute of SMART Biotechnology
- Institute of Technology Innovation
- Institutional Animal Care and Use committee
- Institutional Biosafety committee
- International Climate and Environmental Research Center
- Knowledge Contents Research Institute
- Konkuk International Healthcare Institute
- Konkuk SMART FTA Institute
- Konkuk Social Policy Research Institute
- Konkuk Trade & Tariff Institute
- Konkuk University Public Design Research Center
- Korea Aerospace Design·Air Worthiness Institute
- Korea Hemp Institute
- Korea Nokyong Research Center
- Korea Sports Turfgrass Research Center
- KU Institute of Communication Studies
- KU Language and Cognition Research Center
- Laboratory Animal Research Center
- Life Resource Cooperative Research Institute
- Liquid Crystals Research Center
- Mathematical Science Research Center
- Music Education Research Center
- Nano Technology Research Center
- New Media Art Laboratory
- Physical Activity & Performance Institute
- Quantum Institute for Emerging Technologies
- Regional Development Design Center
- Research Center for Innovative Electricity Market Technology
- Research Center for Livestock Industry of North Korea
- Research Center for Network and Energy Industries
- Research Institute for Eco-based Society
- Research Institute of animal models for diseases & stem cell
- Research Institute of Art Culture
- Research Institute of Basic Sciences
- Research institute of Biomedical engineering
- Research Institute of Economics & Management
- Research Institute of Education
- Research Institute of Food Biotechnology
- Research Institute of Glocal Culture strategy
- Research Institute of Industrial Technology
- Research Institute of Inflammatory Diseases
- Research Institute of Law
- Research Institute of Life & Environment
- Research Institute of Meat Science and Culture
- Research Institute of Neurobiology
- Research Institute of Social Sciences
- Research Institute of Urban Administration
- SK chemicals - KU Biomaterials Institute
- SMART Institute of Advanced Biomedical Science
- SMART SANGHUH Bio Research Institute
- Social Eco-Tech Institute
- Software Research Center
- The Academy of Korea Horse Industry
- The Center for Asia and Diaspora
- The Center for Middle Eastern Studies
- The Institute for the 3Rs
- The Research Center for the Korean History of Technology
- The Research Institute for Global Management of Technology for Catching Up
- The Research Institute of Art and Design
- The Research Institute of Medical Sciences
- The Research Institute of Natural Science
- The Study for Body Culture Institute
- Veterinary Science Research Institute

=== Distinguished professors ===
- Yongmin Cho, particle physicist
- Roger D. Kornberg, Stanford University professor and 2006 Nobel Prize laureate in chemistry
- William F. Miller, Stanford University professor emeritus
- Hans Robert Schöler, director of the Max Planck Institute for Molecular Biomedicine

=== Konkuk Language Institute ===
In 1990, Konkuk University Language Institute began to provide instruction in English and other foreign languages. Courses on Chinese, English, French, Japanese, Spanish, and Vietnamese are available to Konkuk University students and the general public. In 1998, the institute introduced Korean language programs for foreigners with short-term courses lasting 1–2 weeks, as well as longer 3-month courses. The institute also provides training for Korean language teachers.

University rankings

Global – Overall
- QS World: =654 (2026)

== Campus ==
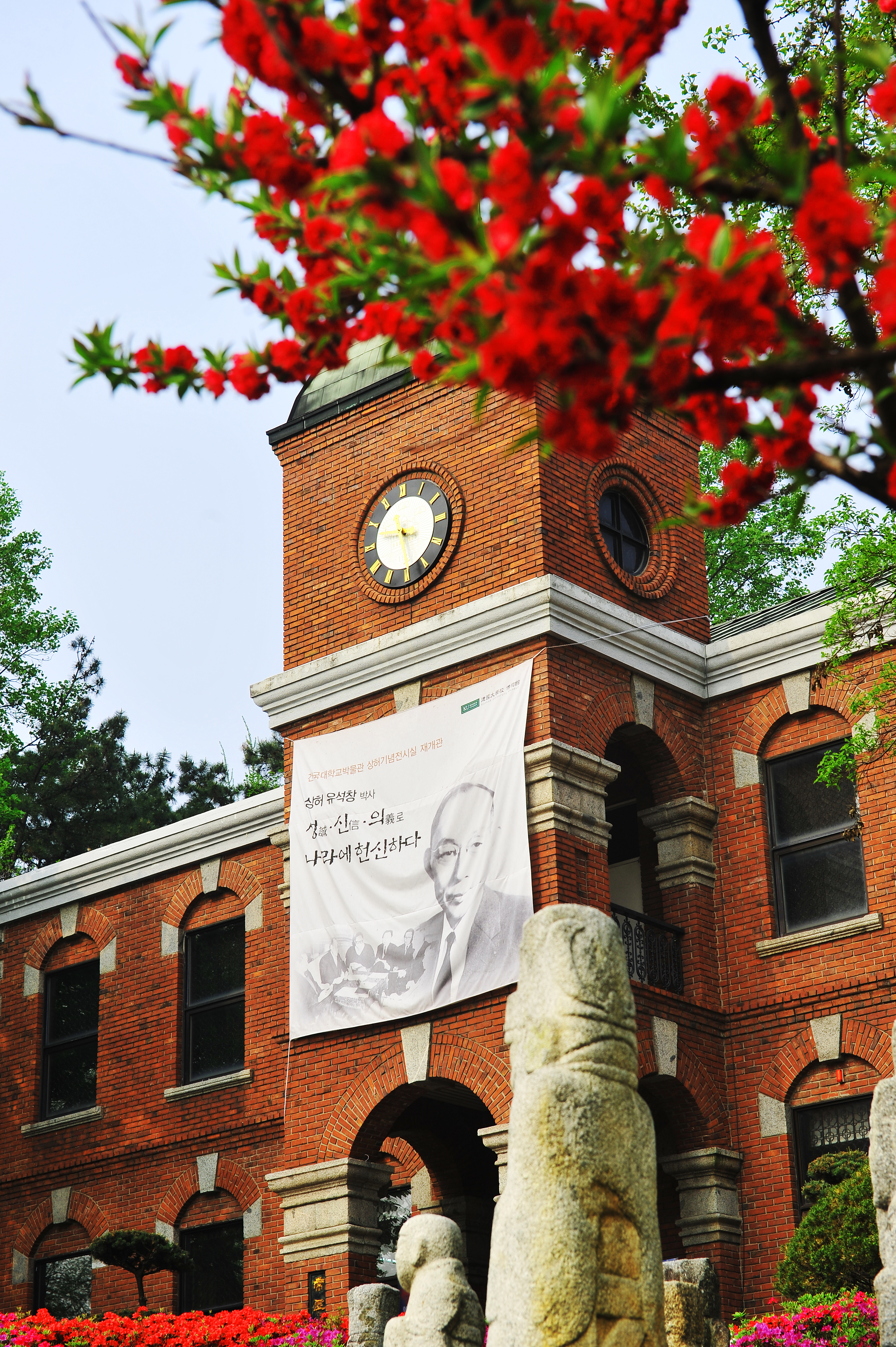
Konkuk University Museum during the spring

=== Konkuk University Museum ===
Established in 1963, Konkuk University Museum features 4,532 historical artifacts, including Dongguk Jeongun, one of the National Treasures of South Korea. The museum originated in Nagwon-dong, Jongno-gu, and in 1985 moved to the Sanghuh Memorial Hall, the building in which the Chosun School of Politics was founded. The museum is open to the public, and special lectures on Korean history and culture are given throughout the year.

=== Sanghuh Memorial Library ===
Sanghuh Memorial Library serves as Konkuk University's main library. Opened in 1989, it was the largest library in Asia at the time. As of February 2014, the library had more than 900,000 Korean books and 200,000 foreign language books. Six reading rooms with about 2,200 seats are available, and a reading room on the third floor of the library is open 24 hours a day.

=== Ilgam Lake ===
Ilgam Lake is located at the center of Konkuk University's Seoul campus. This swamp was converted to an artificial lake when the university moved the campus from Nagwon-dong to the current location in 1954. In the 1950s and 1960s, indoor ice-skating rinks were uncommon, and the lake was used for national competitions. Occupying 55,661 m^{2} (599,130 sq ft), the lake accounts for approximately one-ninth of the campus area. To maintain water quality, 650 tons of underground water is added daily, and a motorboat is used to prevent algal blooms.

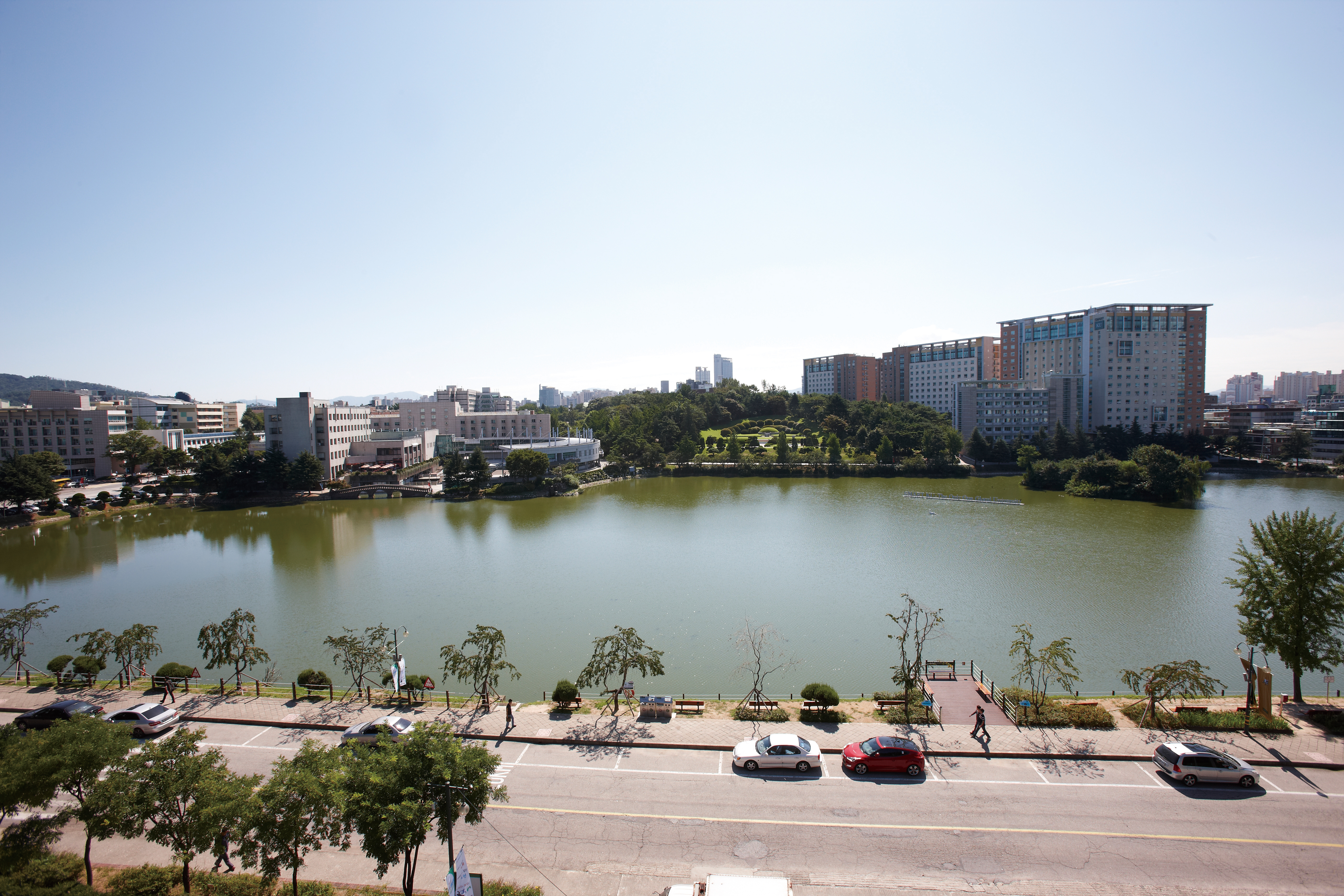
Ilgam Lake

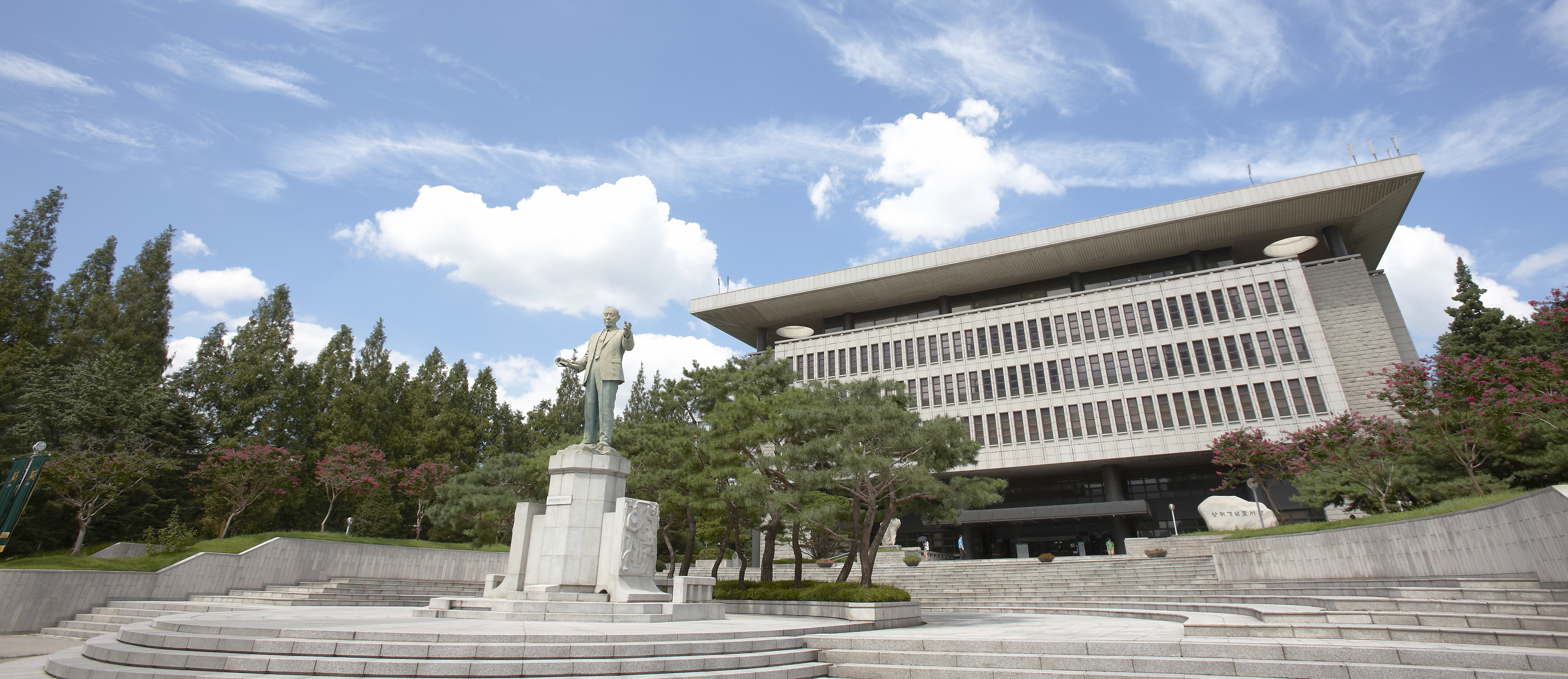
Sanghuh Memorial Library

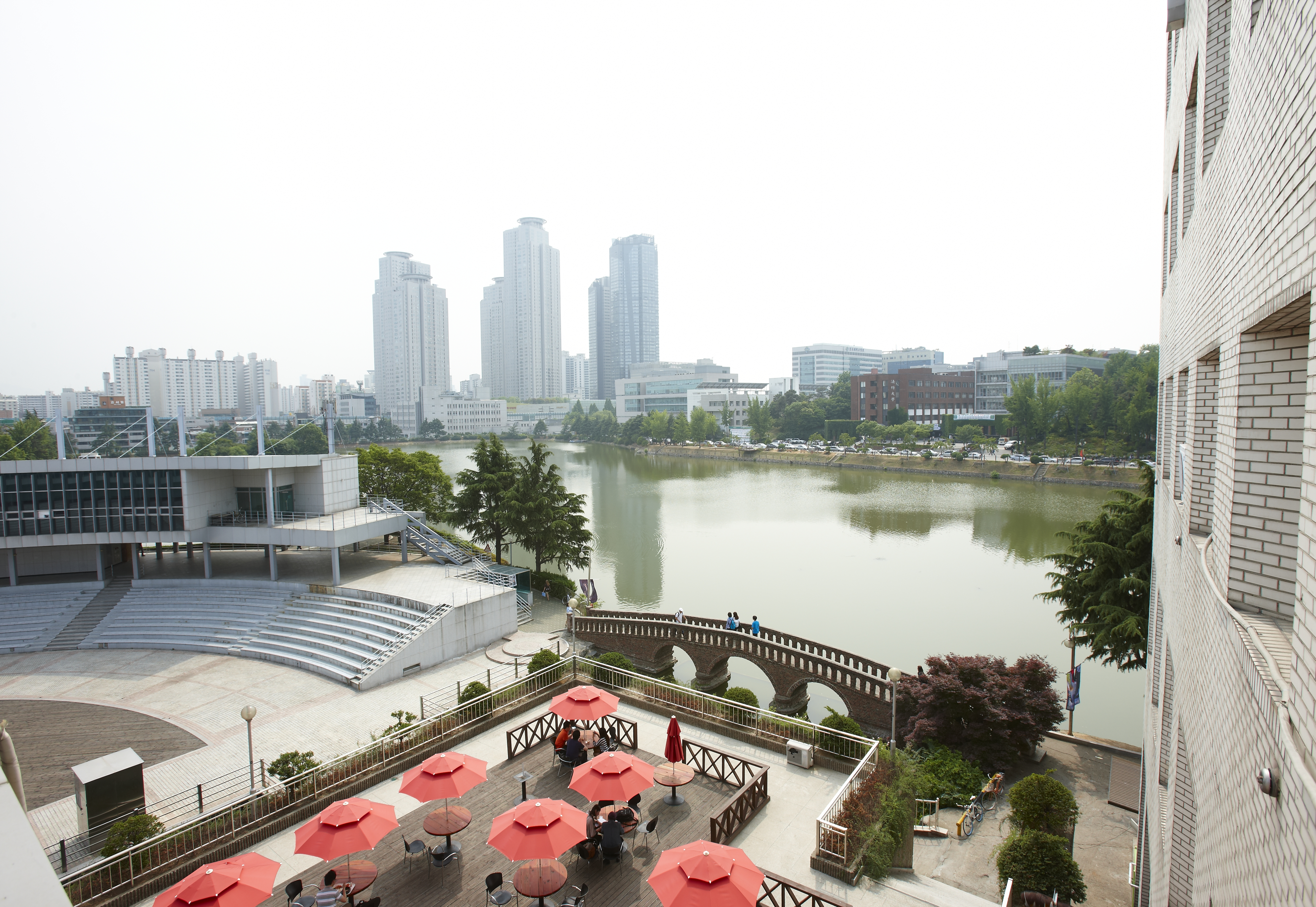
Konkuk University's Seoul Campus

== Student life and university events ==
Konkuk University has more than 70 student clubs.

Foundation Day is an annual ceremony that commemorates Yoo Seok-chang's founding of Konkuk University on May 15, 1946. It is held for students, faculty, staff, alumni, parents, and guests. Awards are presented to the faculty and staff who have contributed to the university. Around the same time, Konkuk University's student association organizes the Ilgam Lake Festival. This three-day long event features performances and exhibitions by college departments and student clubs. Famous K-pop celebrities are also invited to perform in a concert.

In late October, colleges and student clubs stage the Fall Art Festival to showcase their academic achievements and artistic talent. This three-day long event is organized by the Student Club Association.

== Recent developments ==
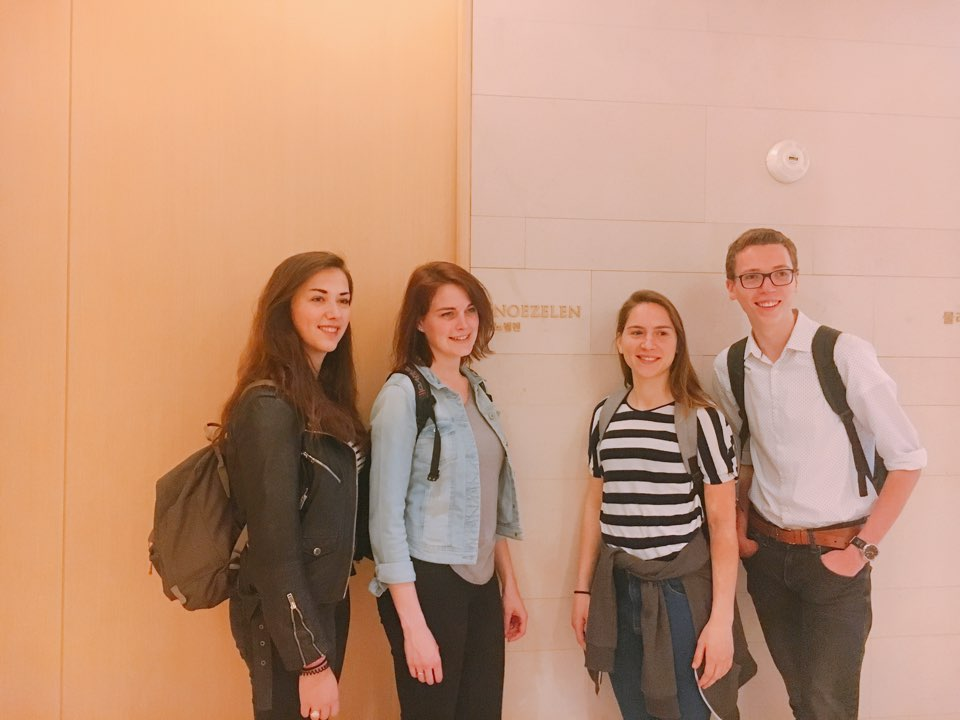
Dutch Students participated the Living Lab Project

=== PRIME Project ===
On May 3, 2016, Konkuk University announced that it was selected by the Korean government to participate in the Program for Industrial Needs-Matched Education (PRIME). Higher education institutions receive incentives for restructuring and training students to meet the society's needs under the project. Of the 75 universities that applied, Konkuk University, Ewha Womans University, Hanyang University's ERICA campus, and 18 other universities were chosen. As a result, Konkuk University is expected to receive up to 450 billion won in government funding over three years until 2018. More than 15% will be allocated for scholarships, and a significant portion will be used to improve educational programs and build infrastructure.

=== Konkuk Institute of Technology ===
In 2017, Konkuk University introduced the "Konkuk Institute of Technology" to train and prepare students for industries with significant growth potential. The institute includes eight departments in energy engineering, smart vehicle engineering, smart ICT engineering, cosmetics engineering, stem cell and regenerative biology, systems biotechnology, integrative bioscience and biotechnology, and biomedical science and engineering with 333 students. Konkuk University plans to offer a 5-year BS/MS program, through which all students will receive a scholarship for their graduate education as well as a stipend of 300,000 won per month for book purchases and research, at the institute. The registration fee for all incoming students will be waived.

=== Plus Semester System ===
As an alternative to the prevalent 2-semester, 4-year undergraduate programs, Konkuk University introduced the Plus Semester System which will allow students to take initiative in designing their own curriculum. The innovative system is part of an effort to make university education more student-focused and tailored to meet changing industry demands. Konkuk students will be able to choose from a variety of options, including the 2+One-Semester On-The-Job Training program, 3+1 Employment program, 7+1 Self-Designed Semester program, and 4+1 Bachelor's and master's degree program. The 2+One-Semester program allows students to gain work experience during the semester and take classes to fulfill course requirements for their majors during the vacation. For the 7+1 program, students will design their plans for external activities prior to the beginning of the semester. The activities are to develop expertise in areas of interest rather than being limited to opening a new business or finding employment. Once the plans are approved, students receive up to 15 credits once they submit completion reports. The Center for Integrated Science and Technology, which will include four departments in biotechnology and another four in engineering, will offer the 4+1 Bachelor's and master's degree program.

== Notable alumni ==
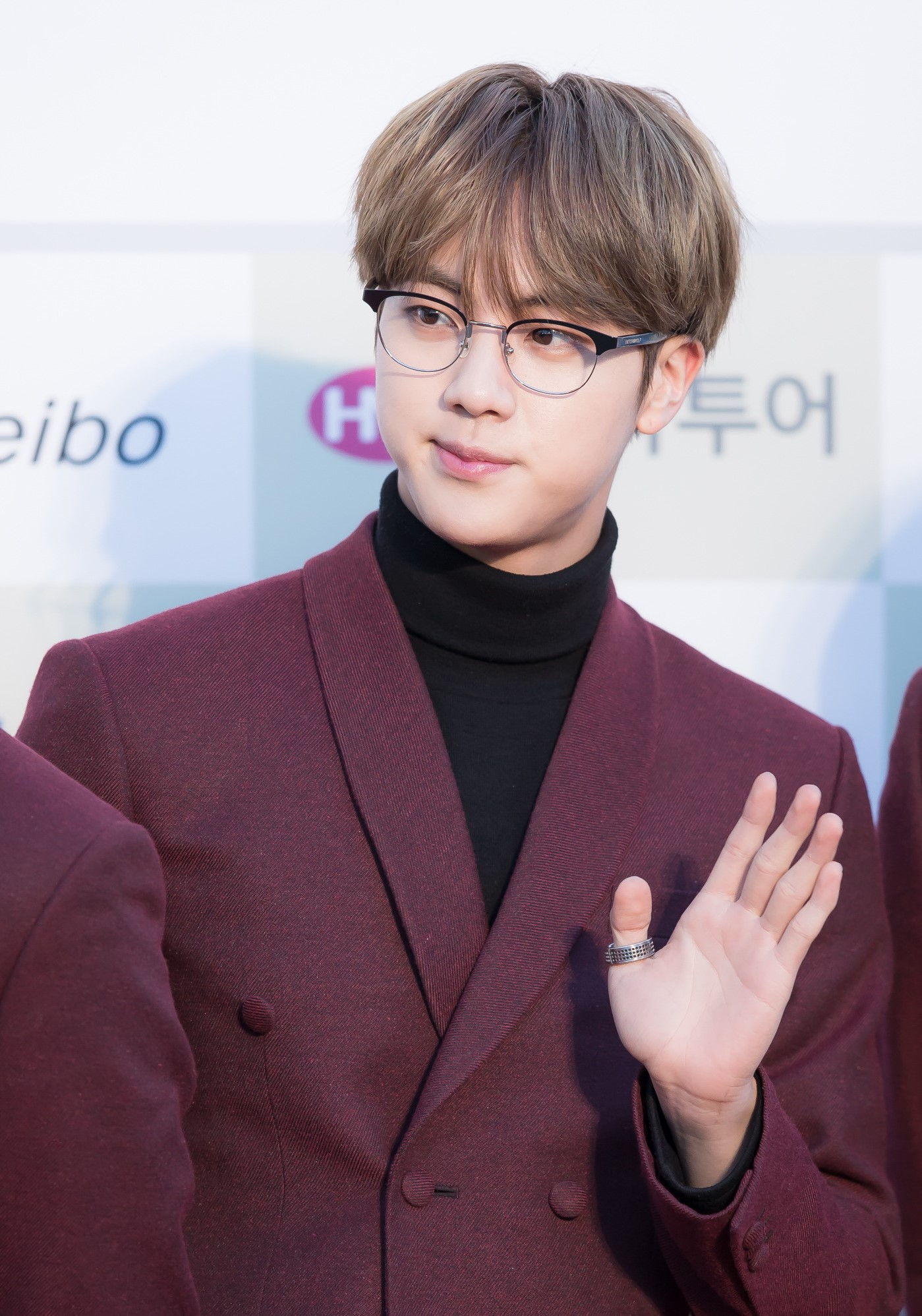
Jin, singer, songwriter, and member of South Korean boy band BTS graduated from the university.

Academia

- Shim Hwa-jin, president of Sungshin Women's University

Arts and literature

- Chung Han-ah, novelist
- Kim Hyesoon, poet
- Jeon Min-hee, fantasy writer
- Shin Dong-yup, poet
- Shin-ik Hahm, conductor

Business

- Chris Nam, president of the Federation of Korean Associations, USA

Civil service, law, and politics

- Jeong Ho-yong, politician
- Kim Han-gil, politician

Entertainment

- Ahn Jae-hong
- Bae Doo-na
- Chae Soo-bin
- Changmin
- Choi Min-ho
- Do Sang-woo
- Gil Eun-hye
- Ko Kyung-pyo
- Hong Hwa-yeon
- Hong Jong-hyun
- Hong Soo-ah
- Hwang Woo-seul-hye
- Lim Jae-beom
- Im Nayeon
- Jang Hee-jin
- Jay B
- Jeon Soo-jin
- Ji Woo
- Joo Hyun
- Joo Won
- Jung Eui-chul
- Kang Kyung-joon
- Kang Tae-oh
- Kim Byung-man
- Kim Da-som
- Kim Hye-yoon
- Kim Jong-wook
- Kim Jung-eun
- Jin
- Kim Young-ran
- Kim Yu-mi
- Ko Joo-yeon
- Lee Da-hae
- Lee Hye-ri
- Lee Hyun-woo
- Lee Jong-suk
- Lee Jung-jin
- Lee Min-ho
- Lee Min-ki
- Lee Won-keun
- Lee Young-pyo
- Na Yoon-sun
- Park Eun-ji
- Park Han-byul
- Park Subin
- Ryu Hye-young
- Seo Woo
- Shin Ae
- Shin Seong-il
- Song Kang
- Uhm Hyun-kyung
- Uhm Tae-goo
- Uhm Tae-woong
- Wang Ji-hye
- Yoo Ah-in
- Yoo Gun
- Yoon Seok-ho

Politics

- Kang Hoon-Sik, Chief of Staff to the President of Republic of Korea
- Jung Chung-rae, Leader of the Democratic Party

== Popular culture ==
Konkuk University has been a popular film location for Korean dramas. Twenty Again, a 2015 Korean television series starring Choi Ji-woo and Lee Sang-yoon was filmed at the main campus in Seoul.

== Affiliates ==
- Konkuk University Middle School
- Konkuk University High School
- Konkuk University Medical Center (KUMC): Located on the west side of the Seoul campus, the current state-of-the-art facility was opened in August 2005 with 875 beds. In 2011, the World Health Organization certified KUMC as a Health promoting hospital and the Korean government also designated KUMC as a "senior medical center" specializing in cancer and cardiovascular diseases. An international clinic for foreign patients has been operating since 2010.
- Konkuk Dairy & Ham
- Konkuk Asset Management Corporation
- The Classic 500
- Smart KU Golf Pavilion

== See also ==
- List of universities in Seoul
