= List of presidents of Konkuk University =

The following is a list of presidents of Konkuk University:

#	Term	President			Tenure	Notes
#	Term	English name	Korean name	Hanja name	Tenure	Notes
1	1	Yu Seok-Chang	유석창	劉錫昶	1959.03.31 ~ 1961.09.30	Founder
2	2	Jeong Dae-Wee	정대위	鄭大爲	1962.01.15 ~ 1968.05.13	
2	3	Jeong Dae-Wee	정대위	鄭大爲	1962.01.15 ~ 1968.05.13	
3	4	Moon Hee-Seok	문희석	文凞奭	1968.11.05 ~ 1970.12.26	
4	5	Gwak Jong-Won	곽종원	郭種元	1971.01.06 ~ 1980.03.28	
4	6	Gwak Jong-Won	곽종원	郭種元	1971.01.06 ~ 1980.03.28	
4	7	Gwak Jong-Won	곽종원	郭種元	1971.01.06 ~ 1980.03.28	
5	8	Jo Il-Moon	조일문	趙一文	1980.03.29 ~ 1983.02.28	
6	9	Gwon Yeong-Chan	권영찬	權寧贊	1983.03.01 ~ 1988.05.20	
6	10	Gwon Yeong-Chan	권영찬	權寧贊	1983.03.01 ~ 1988.05.20	
		Yoon Hyo-Jik	윤효직	尹孝稷	1988.05.21 ~ 1988.08.09	Acted for the Duty of President
7	11	Kim Yong-Han	김용한	金容漢	1988.08.10 ~ 1991.02.28	
8	12	Ahn Yong-Gyo	안용교	安溶敎	1991.03.01 ~ 1993.01.31	
9	13	Jeong Ho-Kwon	정호권	鄭鎬權	1993.02.01 ~ 1994.06.21	
		Kim Hyeon-Yong	김현용	金鉉龍	1994.06.21 ~ 1994.08.31	Acted for the Duty of President
10	14	Yoon Hyeong-Seob	윤형섭	尹亨燮	1994.09.01 ~ 1998.08.31	
11	15	Maeng Won-Jae	맹원재	孟元在	1998.09.01 ~ 2002.08.31	
12	16	Jeong Gil-Saeng	정길생	鄭吉生	2002.09.01 ~ 2006.08.31	
13	17	Oh Myung	오명	吳明	2006.09.01 ~ 2010.08.31	present
