= Otto Hahn Medal =

- Awarded for: Outstanding scientific achievement by junior scientists.
- Country: Germany
- Presented by: Max Planck Society
- Reward: €7,500
- First award: 1978
- Website: http://www.mpg.de/290879/Otto_Hahn_Medal

The Otto Hahn Medal (German: Otto-Hahn-Medaille) is awarded by the Max Planck Society to young scientists and researchers in both the natural and social sciences. The award takes its name from the German chemist and Nobel Prize laureate Otto Hahn, who served as the first president of the Max Planck Society from 1948 to 1960.

The medal is awarded annually to a maximum of thirty junior scientists in recognition of outstanding scientific achievement. Up to ten awardees are selected in each of three thematized sections: 1) Biological-Medical, 2) Chemical-Physical-Engineering, and 3) Social Science-Humanities. It is accompanied by a monetary award of €7,500. Medalists are awarded during a ceremony at the General Meeting of the Max Planck Society, taking place annually in alternating locales in Germany.

== Notable awardees ==
- Bindu Rani, astrophysist
- Ralf Adams, biochemist
- Susanne Albers, computer scientist, 2008 Leibniz Prize winner
- Niko Beerenwinkel, mathematician
- Niklas Beisert, theoretical physicist, 2007 Gribov Medal winner
- Martin Beneke, theoretical physicist, 2008 Leibniz Prize winner
- Immanuel Bloch, experimental physicist, 2004 Leibniz Prize winner
- Guido Bünstorf, economist
- Demetrios Christodoulou, mathematician, 1993 MacArthur Fellow
- Bianca Dittrich, theoretical physicist
- Reinhard Genzel, astrophysicist, 2020 Nobel Prize winner
- Daniel Goldstein, cognitive psychologist
- Christiane Koch, physicist, 2002
- Juliane Kokott, Advocate General at the Court of Justice of the European Union
- Maxim Kontsevich, mathematician, 1998 Fields Medalist
- Rainer Mauersberger, astronomer
- Tomaso Poggio, neuroscientist
- Tilman Schirmer, structural biologist
- Wolfgang P. Schleich, theoretical physicist, 1995 Leibniz Prize winner
- Tania Singer, neuroscientist
- Matthias Steinmetz, astronomer, 1998 Packard Fellow
- Friedrich-Karl Thielemann, astrophysicist
- Dietmar Vestweber, biochemist, 1998 Leibniz Prize winner
- Viola Vogel, bioengineer
- Julia Vorholt, microbiologist

== See also ==
- Otto Hahn Prize
- Otto Hahn Peace Medal
- List of general science and technology awards
- List of chemistry awards
- List of awards named after people
- List of early career awards
