= Mauersberger =

Mauersberger may refer to:

== People ==
- Erhard Mauersberger (1903–1982), German choral conductor, brother of Rudolf
- Rainer Mauersberger (born 1957), German astronomer
- Rudolf Mauersberger (1889–1971), German choral conductor and composer

== Astronomical objects ==
- 12782 Mauersberger, an asteroid, named after Rudolf and Erhard Mauersberger
