= Ralph Adams =

Ralph Adams may refer to:

- Ralph Adams (sprinter) (1907–1976), Canadian athlete
- Ralph N. Adams (1924–2002), American bioanalytical chemist
- R. J. Q. Adams (Ralph James Quincy Adams, born 1943), American author and historian

== See also ==
- Ralph Adams-Hale (born 1997), English rugby union player
- Ralph Adams Cram (1863–1942), American architect
- Ralf Adams (born 1966), German biochemist and cell biologist
