= Körber European Science Prize =

European science award

The Körber European Science Prize is a science award presented annually by the Körber Foundation in Hamburg, Germany. It recognizes scientists conducting research in Europe and alternates between the life sciences and the physical sciences. The prize is endowed with €1,000,000 (€750,000 up to 2018).

== History ==
The prize was initiated by the entrepreneur Kurt A. Körber with the help of Reimar Lüst, the president of the Max Planck Society, and was first awarded in 1985. At first, European research teams were honored, but since 2005, it has been awarded only to individual scientists.

== Selection process ==
The prize alternates between life sciences and physical sciences. Candidates are identified by two search committees, one for each field, and shortlisted candidates are invited to submit a summary of their scientific breakthrough and a research proposal. Independent international reviewers assess the candidates and their work, and up to three finalists are presented to the Trustee Committee, which selects the prize winner. Self-nominations are not accepted.

== Prize money ==
The prize is endowed with €1,000,000; prizewinners can keep 10 percent of the money for themselves and must spend the rest on research in Europe in three to five years. Aside from these restrictions they alone can decide how to use the money.

== Presentation ==
The prize is presented every year in the Great Hall of Hamburg City Hall, often with participation by representatives of the Hamburg Senate.

== Prize winners ==
The Körber Foundation lists the following prize winners ( indicates Nobel Prize recipients):

Year	Prize winner(s)	Project or research area
2026	Sara Wickström	The hidden senses of cells
2025	Stephanie Wehner	Pioneering the quantum internet
2024	Erin Schuman	Making memories: brain-cell communication
2023	Cordelia Schmid	Smart image recognition for autonomous robots
2022	Anthony A. Hyman	Cell condensates
2021	Clare Grey	Battery research
2020	Botond Roska	Vision restoration
2019	Bernhard Schölkopf	Artificial intelligence and machine learning
2018	Svante Pääbo ( 2022)	Neanderthal genetics
2017	Karsten Danzmann	Gravitational-wave detection
2016	Hans Clevers	Organoids and stem-cell biology
2015	Nicola Spaldin	Multiferroic materials
2014	May-Britt Moser ( 2014) and Edvard Moser ( 2014)	The brain's navigation system
2013	Immanuel Bloch	Quantum gases
2012	Matthias Mann	Proteomics
2011	Stefan Hell ( 2014)	Nanoscopy
2010	Jiří Friml	Auxin and plant growth
2009	Andre Geim ( 2010)	Graphene
2008	Maria Blasco	Cancer and aging
2007	Peter Seeberger	Carbohydrate vaccines
2006	Ulrich Hartl	Protein folding and chaperones
2005	Philip Russell	Photonic-crystal fibres
2004	Markus Aebi, Thierry Hennet, Jaak Jaeken, Ludwig Lehle, Gert Matthijs and Kurt von Figura	Therapies for hereditary diseases
2003	Ben Feringa ( 2016), Martin Möller, Justin Molloy and Niek F. van Hulst	Light-driven molecular walkers
2002	Mark W. J. Ferguson, Jeffrey Hubbell, Cay M. Kielty, Björn Stark and Michael G. Walker	Scar-free wound healing using tissue engineering
2001	Wolf B. Frommer, Rainer Hedrich, Enrico Martinoia, Dale Sanders and Norbert Sauer	Optimised crops through genetic engineering
2000	Rodney Douglas, Amiram Grinvald, Randolf Menzel, Wolf Singer and Christoph von der Malsburg	Perception of shape in technology with insights from nature
1999	Bernd Kröplin, Per Lindstrand, John Adrian Pyle and Michael André Rehmet	High-altitude platforms for telecommunications
1998	Henry Baltes, Wolfgang Göpel and Massimo Rudan	Electronic micronoses to enhance safety at the workplace
1998	Werner Heil, Michèle Leduc, Ernst W. Otten and Manfred Thelen	Magnetic resonance tomography with helium-3
1997	Pawel Kisielow, Klaus Rajewsky and Harald von Boehmer	Mutant mouse models in clinical research
1996	Michael F. Ashby, Yves Bréchet and Michel Rappaz	Computer-assisted design of materials
1996	Pierre Charles-Dominique, Antoine Cleef, Gerhard Gottsberger, Bert Hölldobler, Karl E. Linsenmair and Ulrich Lüttge	Tropical treetop habitats
1995	Rudolf Amann, Erik C. Böttger, Ulf B. Göbel, Bo Barker Jørgensen, Niels Peter Revsbech, Karl-Heinz Schleifer and Jiri Wanner	Genetic probes in environmental research and medicine
1994	Dénes Dudits, Dirk Inzé, Anne Marie Lambert and Horst Lörz	Modern plant breeding
1993	Felix Chernousko, François Clarac, Holk Cruse and Friedrich Pfeiffer	Bionics of walking
1992	Philippe Behra, Wolfgang Kinzelbach, Ludwig Luckner, René Schwarzenbach and Laura Sigg	Spread and transformation of contaminants in ground water
1991	Lars Ehrenberg, Dietrich Henschler, Werner Lutz and Hans-Günter Neumann	Environmental chemicals and cancer
1990	Lennart Bengtsson, Bert Bolin and Klaus Hasselmann ( 2021)	Forecasting short-term changes in climate
1989	Christian Brunold, Yury Y. Gleba, Lutz Nover, J. David Phillipson, Elmar W. Weiler and Meinhart H. Zenk	Active substances from plant cell cultures
1988	Alfons Buekens, Vasilij Dragalov, Walter Kaminsky and Hansjörg Sinn	Pyrolytic destruction of toxic wastes
1987	Riitta Hari, Matti Krusius, Olli V. Lounasmaa and Martti Salomaa	Creating ultralow temperatures
1987	Karl-Heinz Herrmann, Friedrich Lenz, Hannes Lichte and Gottfried Möllenstedt	Further development of electron holography
1986	Jean-Claude Gluckman, Sven Haahr, George Janossy, David Klatzmann, Luc Montagnier ( 2008) and Paul Rácz	Retrovirus research
1985	Walter Brendel, Michael Delius, Georg Enders, Joseph Holl, Gustav Paumgartner and Tilman Sauerbruch	Applications of shock waves in medicine
1985	Teodor Balevski, Rumen Batschvarov, Emil Momtschilov, Dragan Nenov and Rangel Zvetkov	Back pressure casting technology
