= Max Delbrück Medal =

The Max Delbrück Medal has been awarded annually from 1992 to 2013 by the Max Delbrück Center for Molecular Medicine (German: Max-Delbrück-Centrum für Molekulare Medizin or MDC). Named after the German biophysicist Max Delbrück, it is presented in Berlin to an outstanding scientist on the occasion of the annual "Berlin Lecture on Molecular Medicine", which the MDC organizes together with other Berlin research institutions and Bayer HealthCare. The award recipient usually delivers a lecture after the award.

== Recipients ==
Source: MDC

- 1992: Günter Blobel, Rockefeller University of New York, US
- 1993: no award
- 1994: Sydney Brenner, Cambridge University, England
- 1995: Jean-Pierre Changeux, Pasteur Institute, Paris
- 1996: Robert Allan Weinberg, Whitehead Institute, Cambridge, US
- 1997: Charles Weissmann, Zürich University, Switzerland
- 1998: Svante Pääbo, Max Planck Institute for Evolutionary Anthropology, Leipzig, Germany
- 1999: Paul Berg, Stanford University, US
- 2000: Joan A. Steitz, Yale University, New Haven, US
- 2001: Eric Lander, Whitehead Institute, Cambridge, US
- 2002: Roger Tsien, Howard Hughes Medical Institute (HHMI) und University of California, San Diego, La Jolla, US
- 2003: Ronald D. G. McKay, National Institute of Neurological Disorders and Stroke (NINDS), Bethesda, US
- 2004: Victor J. Dzau, Duke University, Durham (US)
- 2005: Tom Rapoport, Harvard Medical School, Boston/US
- 2006: Rudolf Jaenisch, Whitehead Institute and Massachusetts Institute of Technology (MIT), Cambridge/US
- 2007: Thomas Tuschl, Rockefeller University in New York, US
- 2008: William E. Paul, National Institute of Allergy and Infectious Diseases (NIAID) of the National Institutes of Health (NIH), Bethesda, Maryland, US
- 2009: Klaus Rajewsky, Harvard Medical School, Boston, US
- 2010: Susan Lindquist, Whitehead Institute for Biomedical Research, Cambridge, Massachusetts, US
- 2011: Hans Schöler, Max Planck Institute for Molecular Biomedicine, Münster
- 2012: no award?
- 2013: Irving Weissman, Stanford University School of Medicine

== See also ==
- List of medicine awards
