= Julia Vorholt =

Swiss microbiologist

Julia A. Vorholt
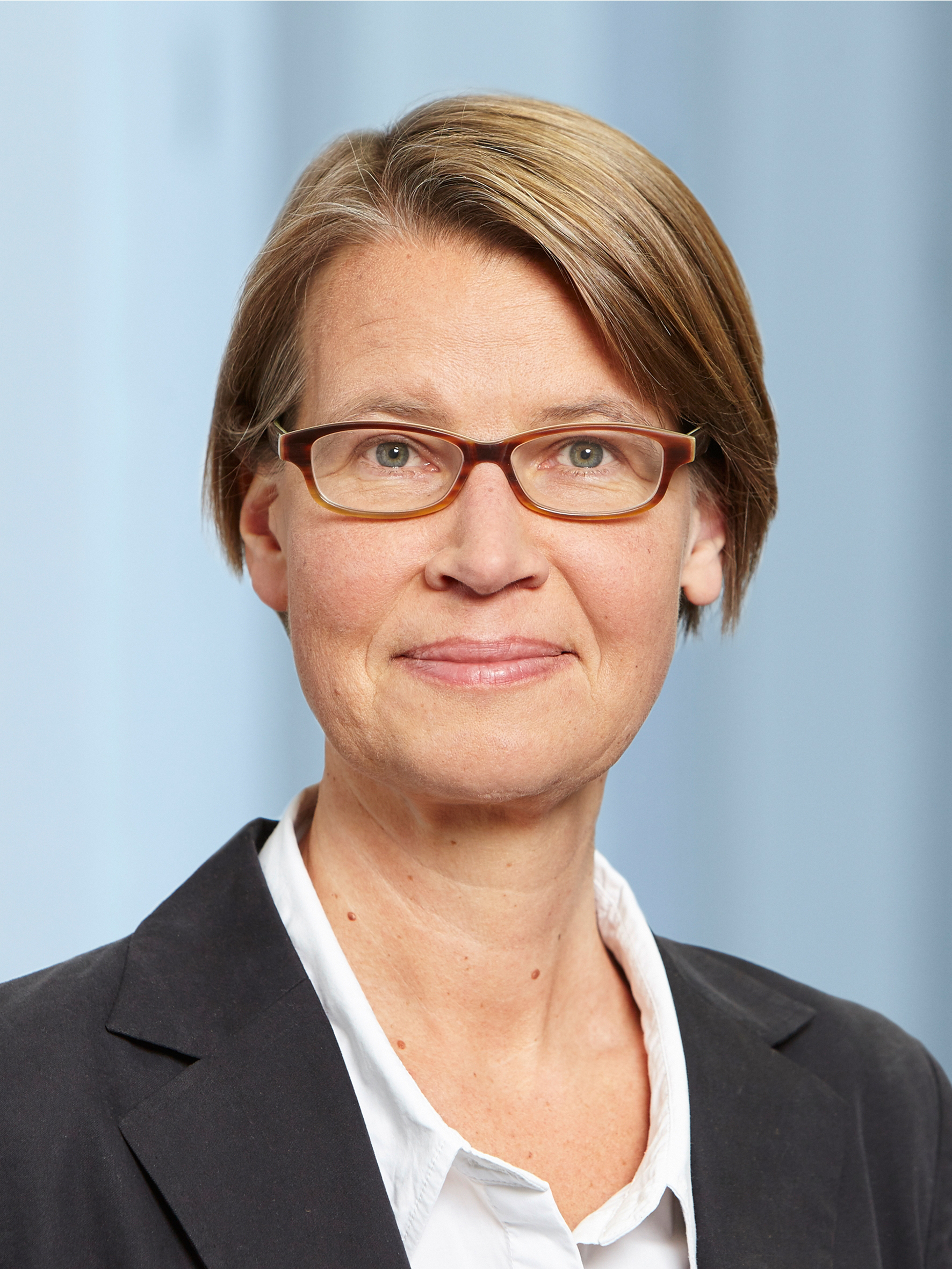
- Vorholt in 2016
- Born: September 15, 1969 (age 56)
- Education: Max Planck Institute for Terrestrial Microbiology (PhD)
- Scientific career
- Fields: Microbiology
- Thesis: Formylmethanofuran-Dehydrogenasen aus methanogenen Archaea Rolle von Eisen-Schwefel-Zentren, von Molybdän und Wolfram und von Selen (1997)
- Doctoral advisor: Rudolf K. Thauer

Julia A. Vorholt (born September 15, 1969) is a German microbiologist who is a full professor of microbiology at ETH Zurich and an elected member of the German Academy of Sciences Leopoldina.

== Biography ==
She earned her PhD in 1997 under professor Rudolf K. Thauer at the Max Planck Institute for Terrestrial Microbiology, for which she was awarded the Otto Hahn Medal, and is a German national residing in Switzerland. Following her Ph.D., she was a postdoctoral researcher with Mary Lidstrom at the University of Washington.

She is a member of the European Academy of Microbiology (EAM).

== Research ==
Current projects of the Vorholt lab at ETH Zurich include:

- Phyllosphere microbiology: Characterizing and understanding standing microbial communities on above-ground plant surfaces, and their impact on plant health and productivity.
- Metabolism of one-carbon compounds: The bacterial pathways that allow growth on single carbon compounds, especially methane and methanol.
- Bacterial stress response: Pathways and regulation of mechanisms involved in bacterial stress response.
- Single cell technologies: Development of microfluidics, in particular FluidFM, single cell force spectroscopy, and other techniques to gather data and manipulate individual cells.

In addition, work from her lab was significant in refuting previous claims by NASA scientists that the arsenic-tolerant bacteria GFAJ-1 could utilize arsenic instead of phosphorus in DNA and other essential biomolecules.

=== Selected publications ===
As of 2013 she had 90 publications, and as of 2015 her work has been cited approximately 4100 times.

- Chistoserdova L, Vorholt JA, Thauer RK, Lidstrom ME (1998). "C1 transfer enzymes and coenzymes linking methylotrophic bacteria and methanogenic Archaea". Science. 281 (5373): 99–102. doi:10.1126/science.281.5373.99. PMID 9651254.
- Delmotte N, Knief C, Chaffron S, Innerebner G, Roschitzki B, et al. (2009). "Community proteogenomics reveals insights into the physiology of phyllosphere bacteria" (PDF). Proceedings of the National Academy of Sciences USA. 106 (38): 16428–16433. Bibcode:2009PNAS..10616428D. doi:10.1073/pnas.0905240106. PMC 2738620. PMID 19805315.
- Vorholt, Julia A. (2012). "Microbial life in the phyllosphere". Nature Reviews Microbiology. 10 (12): 828–840. doi:10.1038/nrmicro2910. hdl:20.500.11850/59727. PMID 23154261. S2CID 10447146.
- Elias M, Wellner A, Goldin-Azulay K, Chabriere E, Vorholt JA, Erb TJ, Tawfik DS (2012). "The molecular basis of phosphate discrimination in arsenate rich environments". Nature. 491 (7422): 134–137. Bibcode:2012Natur.491..134E. doi:10.1038/nature11517. PMID 23034649. S2CID 205230854.
- Campagne S, Damberger FF, Kaczmarczyk A, Francez-Charlot A, Allain FH, Vorholt JA (2012). "Structural basis for sigma factor mimicry in the general stress response of Alphaproteobacteria". Proceedings of the National Academy of Sciences USA. 109 (21): E1405-14. doi:10.1073/pnas.1117003109. PMC 3361459. PMID 22550171.
