= Shim Hwa-jin =

Shim Hwa-jin PhD, Cav
- 심화진
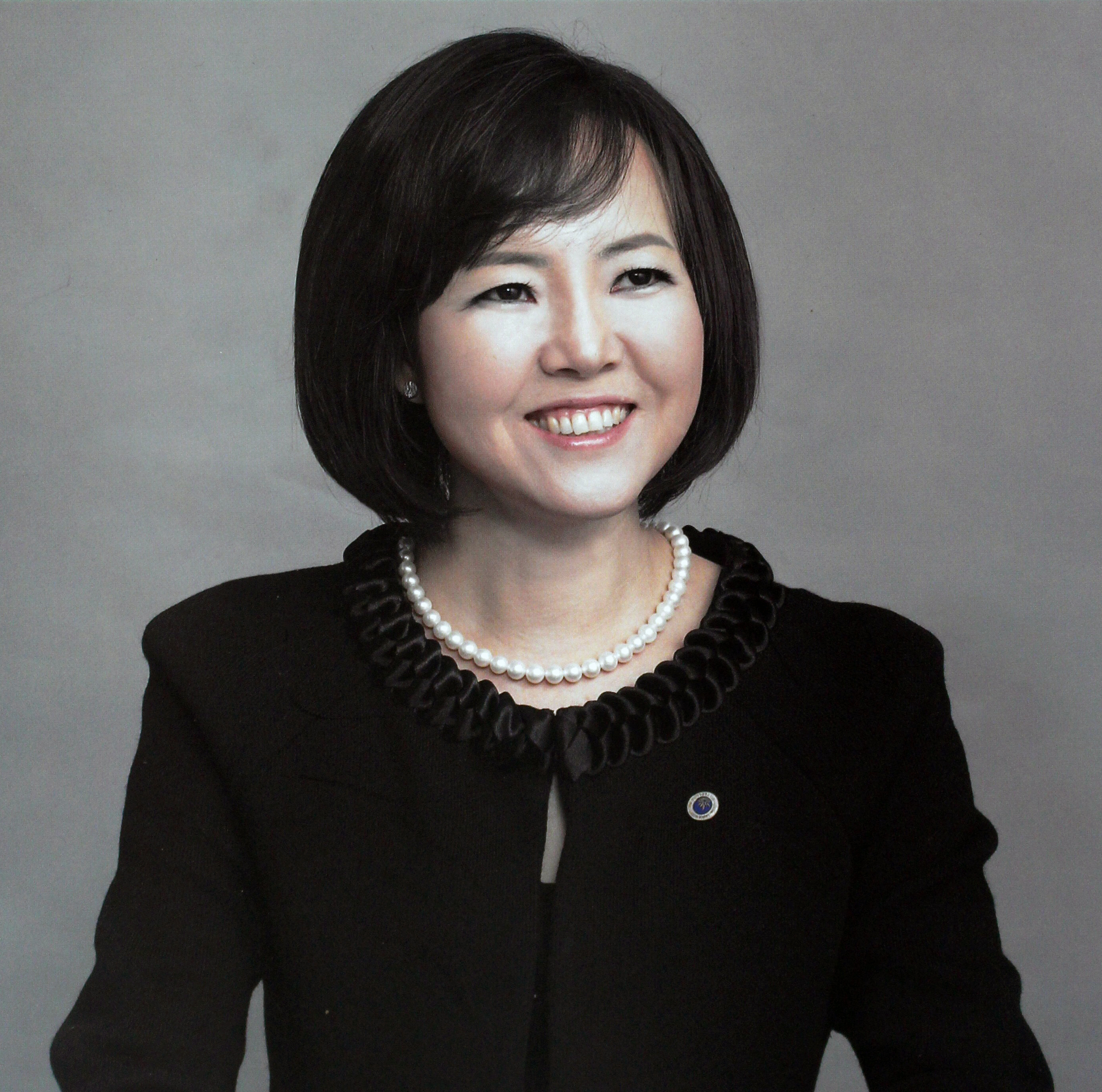
- Born: 24 December 1956 (age 69); Seoul
- Occupations: academic, author
- Known for: President of Sungshin Women's University
- Spouse: Jeon In-beom (전인범)
- Awards: Order of the Star of Italian Solidarity

Academic background
- Education: Sungshin Women's University
- Thesis: (1990)

Academic work
- Discipline: History of fashion

Shim Hwa-jin (born December 24, 1956) is a South Korean academic specialising in the history of clothing and textiles. She was president of Sungshin Women's University from 2007 until 2017, when she was imprisoned for embezzlement.

== Biography ==
Shim is the fourth daughter of chairman Shim Young-hyun, and granddaughter of Sungshin Women's University's founder Li Suk-jeong. She graduated from the Department of Clothing at Konkuk University, then completed her PhD at Sungshin Women's University, after which she became a lecturer there.

== Career ==
Shim became 8th president of Sungshin Women's University in 2007 and continued on as 9th and 10th president.

== Legal case ==
After her reappointment as president for the third term, four members of the university's student association raised concerns that Shim had embezzled funds from the school, which led to their suspension in January 2016. The students successfully pursued a court case to have the suspension overturned, and it was struck down in October. Meanwhile, investigative journalists found that a prominent individual's daughter had been admitted to Sungshin after cheating in the assessment, in addition to a relative of Shim's being appointed as a tenure-track lecturer on the basis of a plagiarised dissertation.

On 7 February 2017, the Seoul Northern District Court returned a guilty verdict for embezzling 378 million won from school funds. She served nine days in prison before posting bail of 50 million won on 20 February. In response to the ruling, Shim's husband resigned from his position on the campaign team for presidential candidate Moon Jae-in, claiming that, if his wife was corrupt, he "would shoot her with a pistol."

== Bibliography ==
- "고문헌을 통해 본 복식과 의복재료 생산의 발전 과정에 관한 연구-고대~ 조선시대를 중심으로" [Study on the developmental process of clothing style and the manufacture of clothing material through the works of ancient writings]. Korean Journal of Family and Home (in Korean). 32 (5). 1994.
- 우리 옷 만들기 [Making our clothes] (in Korean). Seoul: Sungshin Women's University Press. 2004. ISBN 8986092638.
- 두피도감 [Illustrated book of the scalp] (in Korean). Seoul: Sungshin Women's University Press. 2005. ISBN 8986092867.
- 우리 옷 만들기 [Making our clothes]. Seoul: Sungshin Women's University Press. 2009. ISBN 9788960200326.
- 우리 옷 만들기 [Making our clothes] (in Korean). Seoul: Sungshin Women's University. 2015. ISBN 9788960202467.
