= Dietmar Vestweber =

German biochemist

Dietmar Vestweber (born 16 March 1956) is a biochemist and cell biologist. He is the founding director of the Max Planck Institute for Molecular Biomedicine in Münster, Germany.

== Biography ==
Dietmar Vestweber studied biochemistry at the Universities of Tübingen and Munich and at the Max-Planck-Institute of Biochemistry in Martinsried. He received his PhD from the University of Tübingen in 1985 for his research conducted at the Max Planck Institute for Developmental Biology.

For his post-doctoral studies he went to the Biocenter of the University of Basel where he received his habilitation in 1990. In the same year he started as head of a research group at the Max-Planck Institute of Immunobiology in Freiburg and assumed in 1994 a professorship for Cell Biology at the medical school of the University of Münster.

In 1999 he assumed the position of a director at the Max-Planck-Institute of physiological and clinical research, which he held until 2001 when he became the director of the newly founded Max Planck Institute for Molecular Biomedicine in Münster.

== Research ==
Vestweber has worked in three different areas of molecular biology. During his studies for his PhD in the laboratory of Rolf Kemler he investigated the molecular mechanisms of cell recognition and cell adhesion between epithelial cells and during the development of the mouse preimplantation embryo, working on the adhesion molecule E-cadherin (uvomorulin).

In the course of his postdoctoral work in the group of Gottfried Schatz at the Biocenter in Basel, Vestweber studied the biogenesis of mitochondria and found the first membrane component (today known as TOM 40) of the mitochondrial import machinery for the transport of proteins into this organelle.

Since 1990 he investigates molecular mechanisms that control inflammation. Inflammation relies on the entry of leukocytes from the blood into infected or otherwise damaged tissues. Vestweber studies with his group the molecular basis for cell recognition, cell adhesion and cell migration, which mediate and control this process. At present the group focuses in this context on mechanisms that control the barrier function of the vascular endothelium and the blood vessel wall.

The nearly 280 of Vestweber's publications were cited over 26,000 times. According to Scopus, his h-index is 96 (As of 2021).

== Awards ==
- 1985: Otto Hahn Medal of the Max-Planck-Gesellschaft
- 1993: Research Award of the State of Baden-Württemberg
- 1996: Award of the Berlin-Brandenburg Academy of Sciences and Humanities
- 1996: Award for Basic Medical Research, SmithKline Beecham Foundation.
- 1998: Gottfried Wilhelm Leibniz Prize of the DFG
- 1998: Member of the Academia Europaea
- 2002: Member of the German National Academy of Sciences Leopoldina
- 2009: Member of EMBO
