= Christiane Koch =

German physicist and researcher

Christiane P. Koch is a German physicist whose research involves quantum mechanical versions of control theory, including the use of lasers to achieve coherent control of chemical reactions. She has also performed research on efficiently testing the accuracy of quantum computing devices. She is a professor at the Free University of Berlin.

== Education and career ==
Koch studied physics at the Humboldt University of Berlin from 1992 to 1998, during which she was a Fulbright Scholar at the University of Texas at Austin. She did her doctoral studies in chemical physics through Humbold University at the Fritz Haber Institute of the Max Planck Society, completing her Ph.D. in 2002.

After postdoctoral study at the University of Paris-Sud and The Hebrew University of Jerusalem, she became an Emmy Noether Independent Junior Researcher at the Free University of Berlin in 2006. She became a professor at Kassel in 2010, and moved to the Free University of Berlin in 2019.

== Recognition ==
In 2002, Koch won the Otto Hahn Medal of the Max Planck Society.
