= Guido Bünstorf =

Economist

Guido Bünstorf (born 10 October 1968) is an economics professor. Currently a professor at the University of Kassel and head of the university's Economic Policy, Innovation and Entrepreneurship Group.

Since 2010 he has been co-director of International Center for Higher Education Research (INCHER-Kassel). He has been research Professor at Leibniz Institute of Economic Research Halle (IWH) since 2012 and a visiting professor at the University of Aalborg since 2013.

== Career ==
Bünstorf studied economics and political science at the University of Freiburg and University of Massachusetts at Amherst. He earned his Diploma in Economics at the University of Freiburg in 1996. He obtained his doctoral degree in 2002. He was Visiting Researcher in the Department of Social and Decision Sciences, Carnegie Mellon University, Pittsburgh (U.S.A.) from 2002 to 2003. He habilitated in 2008 at the University of Jena, and was Research Group Leader in the Max Planck Institute of Economics, Jena from 2008 to 2009.

== Awards ==
- Stephan Schrader Award 2010 – Munich Best Paper Award Entrepreneurship Research; LMU Munich and Technical University of Munich.
- K. William Kapp Prize 2006; European Association for Evolutionary Political Economy
- Otto Hahn Medal 2003, Max Planck Society for the Advancement of Science
