= Kimera (singer) =

South Korean-born singer

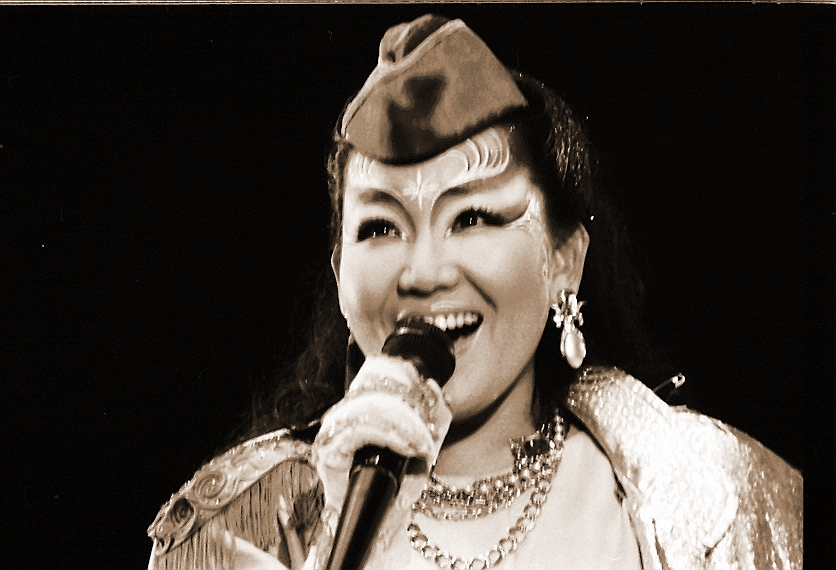
- Kimera in June 1985 in Le Havre

Korean name
- Hangul: 김홍희
- RR: Gim Honghui
- MR: Kim Honghŭi

Kim Hong Hee (Korean: 김홍희; born January 10, 1954), known as Kimera (키메라), is a South Korean-born singer. She developed the style of operatic pop, or popera performing and recording medleys of operatic arias set to a mid-1980s form of disco beat, singing in the soprano register.

== Life and career ==
The third of five children, Kimera has loved singing ever since she can remember. From the age of twelve, she began singing in church choirs, as well as in the Korean National Metropolitan Choir. While attending university, she found she really enjoyed singing pop music as well. However, her father strongly disapproved of pop, which he felt was unsuitable, so she put her love for this genre aside, and eventually stopped singing completely.

Kimera focused on her studies and graduated with a B.A. in French Literature from Sungshin Women's University in Seoul. She then left her native Korea to pursue a post-graduate degree in France, where she studied for an M.A., also in French literature, at the Sorbonne in Paris. While in Paris, her love for singing was reawakened, so she decided to enroll in the École Normale de Musique de Paris to learn operatic technique. After arduous vocal studies, she received in 1984 a Diplôme Supérieur d'Art Lyrique.

Unbeknownst to her parents, Kimera wanted to marry her love of modern music with her love for opera. This culminated in her deciding, in 1984, to set aside her promising career as an opera diva, to create the controversial classic-pop fusion recording, The Lost Opera, with the London Symphony Orchestra. The album promptly entered the British music charts and went on to gather momentum in France, Spain, South Africa, and other countries across the globe.

In 1987, a personal tragedy occurred when her five-year-old daughter, Mélodie Nakachian, was kidnapped on November 9, and held for ransom for 11 days. Although her daughter was eventually recovered unharmed by the Spanish Grupo Especial de Operaciones, Kimera became reluctant to live a life of celebrity, as she blamed her public lifestyle for the unfortunate incident. As a result, she reduced public performances but continued to practice and record in her home studio at Estepona in the Costa del Sol region.

== Stardom and controversy ==
Kimera's music style is that of operatic pop. She has released nine albums to date, with her debut album, The Lost Opera, being the most successful. The Lost Opera, released in 1985, sold over 10 million copies. Her second album, Opera Express and same-titled single were released in 1986. 'Radio friendly' versions of the singles from Kimera's first two albums were also released, which edited down the continuous medleys found on their parent albums. While Kimera was predominantly successful in Europe, primarily in France and Spain, her debut single, The Lost Opera, also reached number 1 on the South African Springbok Charts in June 1985, charting for 19 weeks.

Called the blazing rebel of opera, Kimera blended two genres from opposite ends of the musical spectrum to create a new style of singing utilizing traditional operatic arias and a modern rhythmic pop beat. Kimera referred to her music as "Popera", or "Opera Rock". While Kimera found popular success, some critics, arguing for classical purity, claimed that she vulgarized opera, although the debate as to if opera singers can sing pop and vice versa is ongoing. One critic stated, "Mozart would turn over in his grave if he heard this." Kimera responded to criticism by saying:

"I do popera, which is dramatic and ravishing and I thought I should be like that too. Many people criticized me for 'destroying' classical music but now, I believe I actually bridged the gap between classic and pop music. The makeup represents my music and me and I think it is important to share my dreams, smile and music with fans."

Kimera returned to music after a 15-year hiatus with the release of With Love, Caruso (2008). The album was recorded in collaboration with pop musician Adam Lopez.

== Discography ==
- The Lost Opera (Medley) (1984, Kimera) #1 in South Africa
- Operathèque: The Lost Opera * Double CD (1984, Meloam publishing)
- Operatique: The Lost Opera (1985, Ariola)
- Opera Express (1985)
- Hits On Opera (with The London Symphony Orchestra) (1985)
- Marching Forever (1986)
- Madre (1988, Meloam Publishing)
- Kimera Sings Christmas (1990, Kimera)
- Femme Sauvage (1990, Meloam Publishing)
- Classic All Star (1993)
- With Love, Caruso (2008, Meloam Publishing)

== Family ==
Kimera's real name is Kim Hong-Hee. In 1984, she married Raymond Nakachian (1932–2014), a wealthy Lebanese Armenian businessman; she gave birth to daughter Melodie and son, Amir. Her husband died in Estepona (Spain) on June 16, 2014. She currently resides in Spain.

== Recognition ==
In 2008, she was chosen as the goodwill ambassador of the 2008 Korean Festival, organized by the Overseas Koreans Foundation.

== See also ==
- Classical crossover music
- Hooked on Classics
