= Matthias Steinmetz =

German astronomer

Matthias Steinmetz (born 8 March 1966 in Saarbrücken) is a German astronomer and astrophysicist. He is director of the Astrophysical Institute Potsdam (AIP) and professor at the University of Potsdam.

Steinmetz is a specialist in the areas of cosmology, the formation and evolution of galaxies and computational astrophysics. Steinmetz has a B.S. in Mathematics and Physics from the Saarland University (1988) and a M.S. in Physics from the Technical University of Munich (1991). He received his Ph.D. in Physics in 1993 at the Max Planck Institute for Astrophysics in Garching. For his thesis "On the formation and evolution of galaxies" he was awarded the Otto Hahn Medal of the Max Planck Society. He was a postdoctoral fellow at the Max Planck Institute for Astrophysics and at the Department for Astronomy at the University of California, Berkeley. In 1996 he joined the faculty of Steward Observatory at the University of Arizona in Tucson. Since 2002 he has been the director of the Astrophysical Institute Potsdam (AIP) and professor at University of Potsdam. He also holds a position of adjunct professor at Steward Observatory.

== Awards ==
- Otto Hahn Medal of the Max Planck Society (1993)
- Sloan Fellowship award (1998)
- Packard Fellowship award (1998)
