= Sara Wickström =

Finnish medical doctor and cell biologist

- Education: University of Helsinki (M.D., Ph.D.)
- Known for: tissue stem cell communication
- Awards: Körber European Science Prize 2026
- Scientific career
- Fields: Mechanobiology
- Workplaces: Max Planck Institute for Molecular Biomedicine
- Thesis: Endostatin in the regulation of endothelial cell-matrix interactions and pericellular proteolysis (2004)
- Doctoral advisor: Jorma Keski-Oja
- Website: www.mpg.de/17463007/molecular-biomedicine-wickstroem

Sara A. Wickström is a Finnish medical doctor and cell biologist. She is the research director of the department of Cell and Tissue Dynamics at the Max Planck Institute for Molecular Biomedicine in Münster, Germany.

Wickström was awarded the Körber European Science Prize in 2026.

== Current research ==
Sara Wickström's research lab forcuses on how complex tissues are formed, maintained and regenerated. Further research topics are the mechanisms of cancer escaping cell state barriers.
