= The Lost Opera =

- Cover of the 1985 reissue

Studio album by London Symphony Orchestra with Kimera
- Released: 1984
- Genre: Classical
- Label: Red Bus (1984); Stylus (1985)
- Producer: Steve Rowland

The Lost Opera (also stylized The Lost O?era) is an album by the Korean soprano Kimera and the Operaiders with the London Symphony Orchestra. Consisting of snatches of popular operatic arias and choruses against a disco beat, in the style of the Hooked on Classics album, it was released in 1984 by the record label Red Bus. Whilst not a major UK success, it spent some sixteen weeks in the French charts. It was repackaged in a style more disco than classical in 1985 and reissued with the more descriptive title Hits on Opera, and with a more techno-style cover illustration, but it gained little additional interest. Being neither one thing nor the other, however, its audience was bound to be divided and it may be regarded as an experiment belonging to its time.

== Track listing ==
=== Side One ===
1. "Caro nome" (Verdi from Rigoletto)
2. "Operature 1" (J. Fiddy from "The Lost Opera")
3. "Overture - Madame Butterfly" (Puccini)
4. "Ah non giunge" (Bellini from La Sonnambula)
5. "Nun's Chorus" (J. Strauss from Casanova)
6. "La Donna è Mobile" (Verdi from Rigoletto)
7. "Excerpt - Vesti La Giubba" (Leoncavallo from I Pagliacci)
8. "Holle rache" (Mozart from The Magic Flute)
9. "Largo al Factotum" (Rossini from The Barber of Seville)
10. "Chanson Boheme" (Bizet from Carmen)
11. "J'ai Perdu Mon Eurydice" (Gluck from Orpheus)
12. "Couplets - Escamillo's song" (Bizet from Carmen)
13. "Operature 2" (J. Fiddy from "The Lost Opera")
14. "Air des Clochettes" (Delibes from Lakmé)
15. "Reprise - Caro Nome" (Verdi from Rigoletto)

=== Side Two ===
1. "Operature 3" (J. Fiddy from "The Lost Opera")
2. "Sempre libera" (Verdi from La traviata)
3. "Humming chorus" (Puccini from Madame Butterfly)
4. "L'Amour est un Oiseau (Habanera)" (Bizet from Carmen)
5. "Operature 4" (J. Fiddy from "The Lost Opera")
6. "The Flower Duet" (Delibes from Lakmé)
7. "Va pensiero" (Verdi from Nabucco)
8. "Prelude Nº 1" (J.S Bach)
9. "Ave Maria" (Schubert/Storck)
10. "Ave Maria" (J.S. Bach/Gounod)
11. "Un Bel Di" (Puccini from Madame Butterfly)

== Personnel ==
- Kimera - Lead Vocals
- John Fiddy - Arranger
- Steve Rowland - Producer
- The Ambrosian Singers - Chorus
