= Chung Han-ah =

South Korean novelist

- Born: 1982 (age 43–44); Seoul, South Korea

Korean name
- Hangul: 정한아
- RR: Jeong Hana
- MR: Chŏng Hana

Chung Han-ah (born 1982) is a South Korean writer.

== Life ==
Chung Han-ah was born in Seoul in 1982. She graduated in Korean Literature from Konkuk University, and completed a master's degree in the same school. She won the 4th Daesan Collegiate Literary Prize in 2006, and the 12th Munhakdongne Writer Award in 2007.

== Writing ==
The characters in Chung Han-ah's fiction are all scarred people. Their scars often start from family relationships. In “Binbang” (빈방 The Empty Room), the father is having an affair, and in “Geurandeu mangsang hotel” (그랜드 망상 호텔 The Grand Illusion Hotel), the mother is an alcoholic. In “Opeunhauseu” (오픈하우스 Open House), the parents are so busy that they cannot really take care of what's around them. In “Sinhaeng” (신행 New Behavior), the parents are dead. The child in “Geurandeu mangsang hotel” (그랜드 망상 호텔 The Grand Illusion Hotel) is unable to have normal relationships, and the child in “Opeunhauseu” (오픈하우스 Open House) has anorexia. The child in “Sinhaeng” (신행 New Behavior) marries a man who is certain to destroy her.

As such, Chung Han-ah's characters experience loss and scarcity, including the absence of family, lack of communication, loss of a romantic partner, and neglect toward reality. However, even as Chung Han-ah depicts the pains of such characters, she does not lose her optimism for life. The characters do not frivolously reveal their pains, or attempt to hold onto what they're losing. They give up on things that they cannot do anything about, and do what they can. However, this doesn't mean that they are powerless beings that succumb to reality. What is seen from the characters of Chung Han-ah is an attitude for autonomy in living life one their own, rather than limp compliance. To borrow the words of the literary critic Cha Mi-ryeong, “author Chung Han-ah has a small, but strong will, where she believes that even if she loses her ears and her legs to the brutal world, and end up on the bottom, she will still continue to dance, sing, and dream, and that she will start her life again with such belief.”

== Works ==
- Hallowin (할로윈 Halloween), 2017
- Aeni (애니 Annie), 2015
- Liteul shikago (리틀 시카고 Little Chicago), 2012
- Nareul wihae utda (나를 위해 웃다 Smiling For Myself), 2009
- Dalui bada (달의 바다 The Sea of the Moon), 2007

== Awards ==
- Munhakdongne Writer Award, 2007
