= Bernd Kröplin =

German engineer and academic (1944–2019)

Bernd-Helmut Kröplin (11 November 1944, in Schleswig, Germany – 1 January 2019) was a German engineer and academic.

== Life ==
After a trade apprenticeship as a bricklayer, Kröplin studied Civil Engineering at the Technical University of Braunschweig in 1977 and received a PhD for a thesis on the elastoplastic stability of steel bridges.

In 1979, Kröplin received a Heisenberg Scholarship of the German Research Community DFG and in 1982, he received an appointment as a professor at the University of Dortmund "Applied numerical methods". From 1988 to 2010, Kröplin was dean of the Institute for Statics and Dynamics of Aerospace Structures of the University of Stuttgart.

In 1999, he and three employees received the Körber European Science Prize. With the prize money of 1.5 million German marks, they were asked to produce telecommunication platforms that were stationary at 20 km above the ground.

Prof. Kröplin died on 1 January 2019.

== Non-academic work ==
From September 1996 to March 2002, Kröplin was Chairman of CargoLifter AG, a high-risk high-reward technology venture which was stopped when it was clear there was no commercial viability in a reasonable timeframe. When finances became tighter, he took a more active management role in technology development.

As a researcher, Kröplin became intrigued by the possibility that consciousness could have an effect on water. Kröplin sponsored a number of experiments which have been published in book form with many high quality pictures.

This received indifferent coverage in the press.

== Publications ==
- Kröplin, Bernd-Helmut; Institut für Statik und Dynamik der Luft- und Raumfahrtkonstruktionen, eds. (2001). Welt im Tropfen: Gedächtnis- und Gedankenformen im Wasser; Buch zur Ausstellung (Orig.-Ausg., 1. - 2. Tsd ed.). Stuttgart: Gutesbuchverl. ISBN 978-3-930683-64-2.
