= Hans Robert Schöler =

Molecular biologist

Hans Schöler
- Born: January 30, 1953 (age 72); Toronto, Ontario, Canada
- Education: University of Heidelberg
- Occupation(s): Molecular biologist, stem cell researcher.
- Years active: 1985–present
- Awards: see Awards

Hans Robert Schöler (born 30 January 1953) is a molecular biologist and stem cell researcher. He is director at the Max Planck Institute for Molecular Biomedicine in Münster.

== Biography ==
Hans Schöler was born in 1953 in Toronto, Canada, came to Germany in 1960 and grew up in Paderborn, Munich and Heidelberg. After his studies of Biology at the University of Heidelberg, Schöler conducted the research for his doctoral degree from the University of Heidelberg in 1985 at the Centre for Molecular Biology (ZMBH).

After having headed a research group for Boehringer Mannheim at the Research Center Tutzing and having worked as a staff scientist at the Max Planck Institute for Biophysical Chemistry in Göttingen, Schöler started as head of a research group at the European Molecular Biology Laboratory (EMBL) in Heidelberg in 1991. In 1994, he obtained his habilitation at the Biological Faculty of the Heidelberg University.

In 1999, Hans Schöler left Germany to assume a professorship for Reproductive Physiology at the School of Veterinary Medicine University of Pennsylvania, USA. At the same time, he was director of the Center for Animal Transgenesis and Germ Cell Research at the University of Pennsylvania, Philadelphia, USA. From 2000 until 2004, Schöler held the Marion Dilley and David George Jones Chair for Reproductive Medicine.

Since 2004, Hans Schöler has been director of the Department Cell and Developmental Biology Max Planck Institute for Molecular Biomedicine, Münster. He is professor of the Medical Faculty of the Westfälischen Wilhelms-Universität Münster and also adjunct professor of the University of Pennsylvania and the Hannover Medical School.

== Research ==
Schöler's major research interests are the molecular biology of cells of the germline (pluripotent cells and germ cells), transcriptional regulation of genes in the mammalian germline, deciphering the molecular processes of reprogramming somatic cells after induction with transcription factors, nuclear transfer into oocytes, or fusion with pluripotent cells.

Nearly 277 of Schöler's publications are listed in the i10 Index. These publications were cited over 50,000 times. His Hirsch-Index is 104 (status December 2022).

== Awards ==
- 2008: Robert Koch Prize together with Irving Weissman and Shinya Yamanaka
- 2010: The Ulsan National Institute of Science and Technology (UNIST) inaugurated the 'Hans Schöler Stem Cell Research Center'
- 2011: Kazemi Prize
- 2011: Emil von Behring Lecture
- 2011: Max Delbrück Medal

== Memberships in professional and scientific societies or commissions ==
- since 1995 Member of the American Association for the Advancement of Science
- since 1999 Center for Animal Transgenesis and Germ Cell Research, University of Pennsylvania
- 2003-2006 Member of the Advisory Council “Biological and Genetic Technologies” of the Christian Democrat Parliamentary Party of the German Parliament
- since 2004 Member of the Managing Board of the Stem Cell Network North Rhine Westphalia, Düsseldorf (Head of the Managing Board since January 2005)
- since 2004 Member of the German National Academy of Sciences Leopoldina
- since 2004 Full Professor of the Medical Faculty of the University of Münster, Germany
- since 2005 Member of the North Rhine-Westphalian Academy of Sciences
- since 2005 Representative Member of the Central Ethics Committee for Stem Cell Research (full member since July 2008)
- since 2006 Member of the Center for Bioethics of the University of Münster, Germany
- since 2010 Member of the Berlin-Brandenburg Academy of Sciences and Humanities, Biomedical Class
- since 2011 Member of the Academy of Sciences and Literature, Mainz
- since 2000 Co-editor of the journal Molecular Reproduction and Development
- since 2001 Co-editor of the journal Cloning and Stem Cells
- since 2005 Co-editor of the journal Stem Cells
- since 2006 Co-editor of the Zeitschrift für Regenerative Medizin
- since 2006 Co-editor of the journal Cell Stem Cell
- since 2008 Co-editor of the journal Cell
- since 2009 Co-editor of the journal Stem Cell Reviews and Reports
- since 2011 Co-editor of the journal Stem Cells and Development
- since 2011 Co-editor of the journal The International Journal of Developmental Biology
