= Erin Schuman =

American neurobiologist

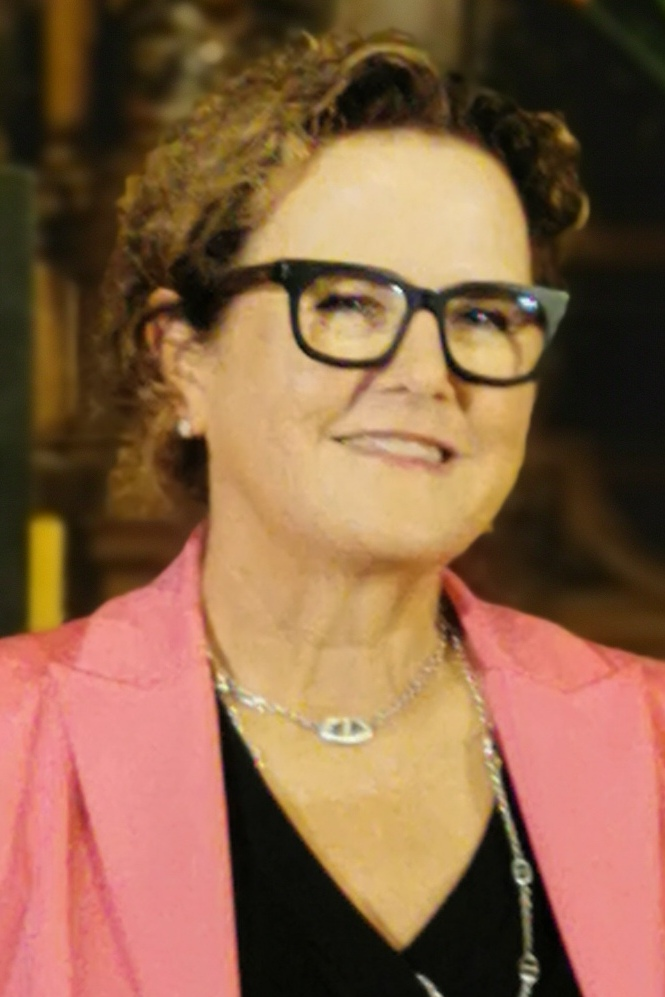
- Schuman in 2024
- Born: May 15, 1963 (age 63); California
- Education: University of Southern California; Princeton University
- Known for: Local protein synthesis in dendrites
- Awards: Beckman Young Investigators Award (1996); Salpeter Lifetime Achievement Award (2018); Louis-Jeantet Prize for Medicine (2020); Rosenstiel Award (2022); The Brain Prize (2023); Körber European Science Prize (2024); Kavli Prize (2026)
- Scientific career
- Workplaces: University College London; Max Planck Institute for Brain Research; California Institute of Technology

Erin Margaret Schuman, born May 15, 1963, in California, US, is a neurobiologist who studies neuronal synapses. She is currently a Director at the Max Planck Institute for Brain Research. She is scheduled to take up her role as Director of the UCL Queen Square Institute of Neurology in January 2027.

== Career ==
Erin Schuman attended the University of Southern California (USC), where she received her B.A. in Psychology (1985). She continued her education to obtain a Ph.D. in Neuroscience from Princeton University (1990). She conducted postdoctoral research from 1990 to 1993 in Daniel V. Madison's lab in the Molecular and Cellular Physiology Department at Stanford University. From there, Schuman was recruited to join the faculty in the Division of Biology at the California Institute of Technology where she moved up the ranks from Assistant to Full Professor. During this time, she was also appointed investigator at the Howard Hughes Medical Institute. In 2009, she was recruited as the Director of Max Planck Institute for Brain Research in Frankfurt am Main, Germany, at which she holds her current position.

== Research ==
The Schuman lab studies the properties of mRNAs and proteins (e.g. the transcriptomes and proteomes) distributed throughout the neuron. Her research has examined how stability in neuronal processes can be brought about by local cell biological processes, like protein synthesis, allowing synapses to respond rapidly and appropriately to changing stimuli. The Schuman lab demonstrated the first functional role for local translation in neurons. In 1996, in the course of exploring how neurotrophins enhance synaptic transmission, Schuman together with graduate student Hyejin Kang made the discovery that local protein synthesis within dendrites is required for this form of synaptic plasticity. She obtained direct proof that protein synthesis occurs in intact, isolated dendrites. This, together with a few other key observations, gave birth to the field of local translation. Her team discovered, using next generation sequencing, over 2500 mRNAs localized to the neuropil. In addition, Schuman and collaborators (Dave Tirrell, Caltech and Daniela Dieterich, Magdeburg) has made invaluable technical contributions, such as the development of non-canonical amino acid metabolic labelling, click chemistry, and mutation of cell-biological enzymes (the BONCAT and FUNCAT techniques), enabling the labelling, purification, identification and visualization of newly synthesized proteins in neurons and other cells.

== Advocacy for women in neuroscience ==
In addition to her research and professorship, Erin Schuman has been committed to promoting the professional advancement of women in the field of neuroscience. Schuman made it a condition of her recruitment to Max Planck that a new child care facility be built on campus. She also spearheaded an initiative outlining changes in recruitment practices aimed at doubling the percentage of female directors in the Max Planck Society's Biology & Medicine Section to 20% by 2020. In 2018, she received the Society for Neuroscience Mika Salpeter Lifetime Achievement Award in for her teaching, mentoring, and advocacy.

== Awards and recognition ==
- 2026 – Kavli Prize in the category "Neurosciences".
- 2026 – HFSP Nakasone Award
- 2024 – Körber European Science Prize
- 2023 – The Brain Prize
- 2022 – Federation of European Biochemical Societies | EMBO Women in Science Award
- 2022 – Rosenstiel Award
- 2020 – Louis-Jeantet Prize for Medicine
- 2018 – Society for Neuroscience, Salpeter Lifetime Achievement Award
- 2017 – Elected Member Academia Europaea
- 2017 – Elected Member German National Academy of Sciences Leopoldina
- 2017 – European Research Council, Advanced Investigator Grant
- 2016 – Forbes Lectures, Marine Biological Laboratory
- 2014 – Elected EMBO member
- 2013 – Alexander Cruickshank Lecture, Gordon Research Conference
- 2013 – Hodgkin-Huxley-Katz Prize
- 2013 – Norbert Elsner Lecture, German Neuroscience Society
- 2011 – European Research Council, Advanced Investigator Grant
- 2005 – Howard Hughes Medical Institute Investigator
- 2002 – Howard Hughes Medical Institute Associate Investigator
- 1997 – Howard Hughes Medical Institute Assistant Investigator
- 1996 – Ferguson Biology Undergraduate Teaching Prize
- 1996–1998 – Beckman Young Investigator Award
- 1995 – Ferguson Biology Graduate Teaching Prize
- 1995 – American Association of University Women Emerging Scholar
- 1995–1999 – Pew Biomedical Scholar
- 1994–1998 – John Merck Scholar
- 1994–1996 – Alfred P. Sloan Research Fellow
- 1994–1996 – McKnight Scholars Award (declined)
- 1991 – Katherine McCormick Foundation fellow
- 1990 – NIH postdoctoral fellowship
- 1986 – NIH predoctoral fellow
- 1985 – Phi Beta Kappa, graduation with honors
- 1985 – Sigma Xi Outstanding Undergraduate Research Award
