= Yves Bréchet =

French physicist (born 1961)

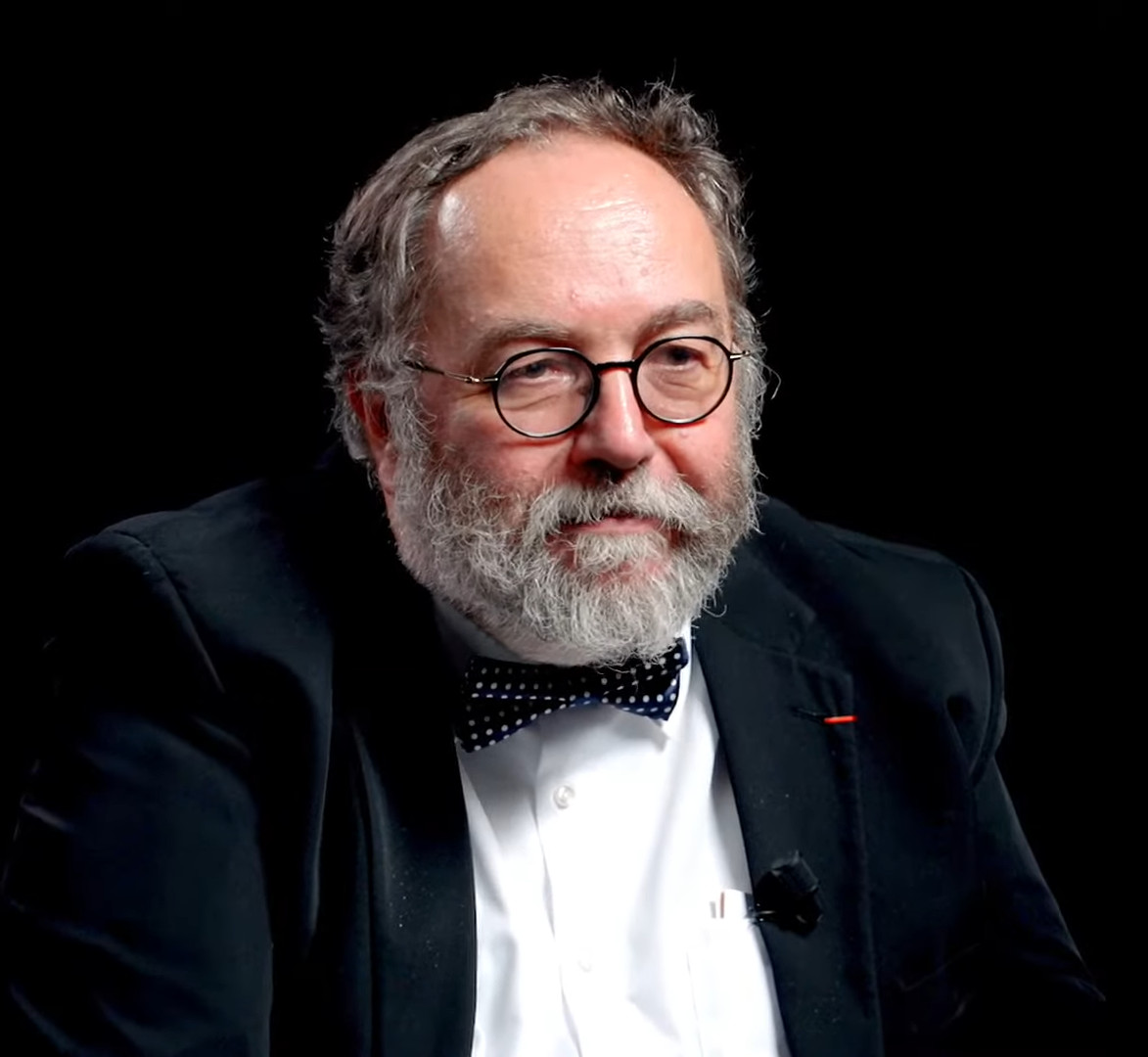
- Bréchet in 2023
- Born: October 12, 1961 (age 64); Chamalières, France
- Education: École Polytechnique; École des hautes études en sciences sociales Joseph Fourier University
- Awards: CNRS Silver Medal
- Scientific career
- Fields: Materials scientist
- Workplaces: Grenoble Institute of Technology McMaster University

Yves Bréchet (French: [bʁeʃɛ]) (born October 12, 1961) is a physicist, specialist of materials science, former High Commissioner for Atomic Energy of France, current Scientific Director of Saint Gobain, professor (part-time) at Monash University, and a member of the French Academy of Sciences.

== Biography ==
Yves Bréchet graduated from École Polytechnique (1981), École des hautes études en sciences sociales (1992) and obtained his doctoral degree and habilitation from Joseph Fourier University in 1987 and 1992, respectively.

He has been a full professor at Grenoble INP/Phelma between 1987 and 2012, an adjunct professor of materials science and engineering at McMaster University (Canada), a senior Research Professor at the Institut Universitaire de France, and a member of the SIMaP (Materials and Processes Science and Engineering) Laboratory with the University of Grenoble.

On 30 November 2010, he was elected to the French Academy of Sciences.

He has been a member of the international scientific council of ArcelorMittal and the Commissariat à l'énergie atomique, and a scientific advisor to Rio Tinto Alcan, EDF and ONERA, as well as several editing boards of scientific journals

On 19 September 2012, he was named to the position of High Commissioner for Atomic Energy and Alternative Energies by the President of the French Republic, succeeding Catherine Cesarsky.

He resigned from this position in 2018, and is now Scientific director of Saint Gobain, while keeping a position as Distinguished Research professor at Monash university, adjunct professor at McMaster university and advisory professor at Jiaotong university. Since 2018 he has been giving a course on "Scientific analysis for political decisions" at the Ecole Nationale d'Administration. He is also president of the Scientific council of Framatome, and president of the scientific council of the non-profit "Maisons pour les Sciences" foundation for scientific education founded by Georges Charpak.

== Research activities ==
His activities have spanned the fields of physical metallurgy, thermodynamics, microstructures, phase transformations, plasticity, fracture micromechanics, material selection, structural materials design, biointerfaces, structural biomimetics. He has written more than 600 papers, co-authored 6 books and supervised more than 80 doctoral students.

== Honors and awards ==
- Pechiney Prize of the French Academy of Sciences (1990)
- Gledden Fellowship, University of Western Australia (1993)
- Materials Science and Technology Prize of FEMS (1995)
- Körber European Science Award (1996) together with M. Ashby and M. Rappaz
- Junior Fellow of the Institut Universitaire de France (1992–1997)
- Weinberg Lecture, University of British Columbia, Canada (2003)
- Sawamura and Guimaraes awards from ISIJ, Japan (2006)
- Cohen Lectures, Northwestern University (2006)
- D.K.McDonald Lecture, Canada (2007)
- CNRS Silver Medal (2009)
- Max Planck Lecture, Max Planck Institute for Metals Research, Stuttgart (2009)
- Thermec Distinguished award (2009)
- Senior Fellow of the Institut Universitaire de France
- Chevalier de la Légion d'Honneur (2010)
- Lee Hsun Research Award, China (2010)
- Henry Marion Howe Medal (2010)
- Prix Gay-Lussac-Humboldt (2010)
- Member of the French Academy of Sciences (2010)
- Member of the Academia Europaea (2011)
- Wolf-Ramanujan lecture (2012)
- Docteur Honoris Causa McMaster University (2012)
- Professor at Collège de France, annual chair "Innovation and Technology" (2012–2013)
- Grande medaille de la Société Française de Métallurgie et Materiaux (2013)
- Cambridge Granta award for excellence in teaching in materials science (2018)
- Shanghai Jiaotong University "Master Distinguished Lecture" (2018)
- Kelly lecture "Armours and Brasiers" (Cambridge 2019)
- Docteur Honoris Causa de l'Université Catholique de Louvain (2019)

== Bibliography ==
- Y. Bréchet, Microstructures, Mechanical Properties and Processes, EUROMAT 99. Volume 3 (2000).
- J. Agren, Y. Bréchet, C. Hutchinson, J. Philibert, G. Purdy, Thermodynamics and Phase Transformations, EDP Sciences, 2006 (ISBN 978-2-86883-889-6).
- Y. Bréchet, D. Embury, P. Onck, Architectured MuItifunctional Materials, MRS Symposium Proceedings (2009)
- M.F. Ashby, D.R.H Jones, Y. Bréchet, J. Courbon, M. Dupeux, "Matériaux. Tome 1, Propriétés, applications et conception", Dunod, 2008 (ISBN 978-2-10-050901-0).
- J. Philibert, A. Vignes, Y. Bréchet, P. Combrade, "Métallurgie, du minerai au matériau", Dunod, 2002 (ISBN 978-2-10-006313-0).
- Salvo, Y. Bréchet, M.F. Ashby, "Traité des matériaux, Tome 20, Sélection des matériaux et des procédés de mise en œuvre", PPUR, 2001 (ISBN 2-88074-473-3).
- Y.Brechet, Lecon inaugurale au college de France " du materiaux de rencontre au materiau sur mesure" (2013)
- Y.Estrin, Y.Brechet, J.Dunlop, P.FRatzl "architectured materials" (2019)
