= Martin Beneke =

German physicist

- Born: 1966 (age 59–60); Konstanz, Germany
- Education: University of Konstanz; University of Cambridge; Heidelberg University
- Scientific career
- Fields: Physics
- Workplaces: RWTH Aachen; Technical University of Munich

Martin Beneke (born 1966) is a German physicist.

== Biography ==
Beneke studied Physics, Mathematics and Philosophy at the University of Konstanz, University of Cambridge and Heidelberg University. In 1993, he received his doctorate at the Technical University of Munich on the structure of perturbative series in higher order and habilitated at Heidelberg University in 1998.

At the age of 33, Beneke became head of the Chair of Theoretical Physics (Department E) at the RWTH Aachen University in 1999. In 2008, Martin Beneke was awarded the Leibniz Prize in the amount of 2.5 Million Euro. The research done by Beneke considerably contributes to the verification of theoretical concepts of elementary particle physics, to the indication of variations and to the identification of new structures.

== Awards ==
- Thawani Prize 1989
- Otto Hahn Medal 1994
- Gottfried Wilhelm Leibniz Prize 2008
