= Rudolf Jaenisch =

German biologist (born 1942)

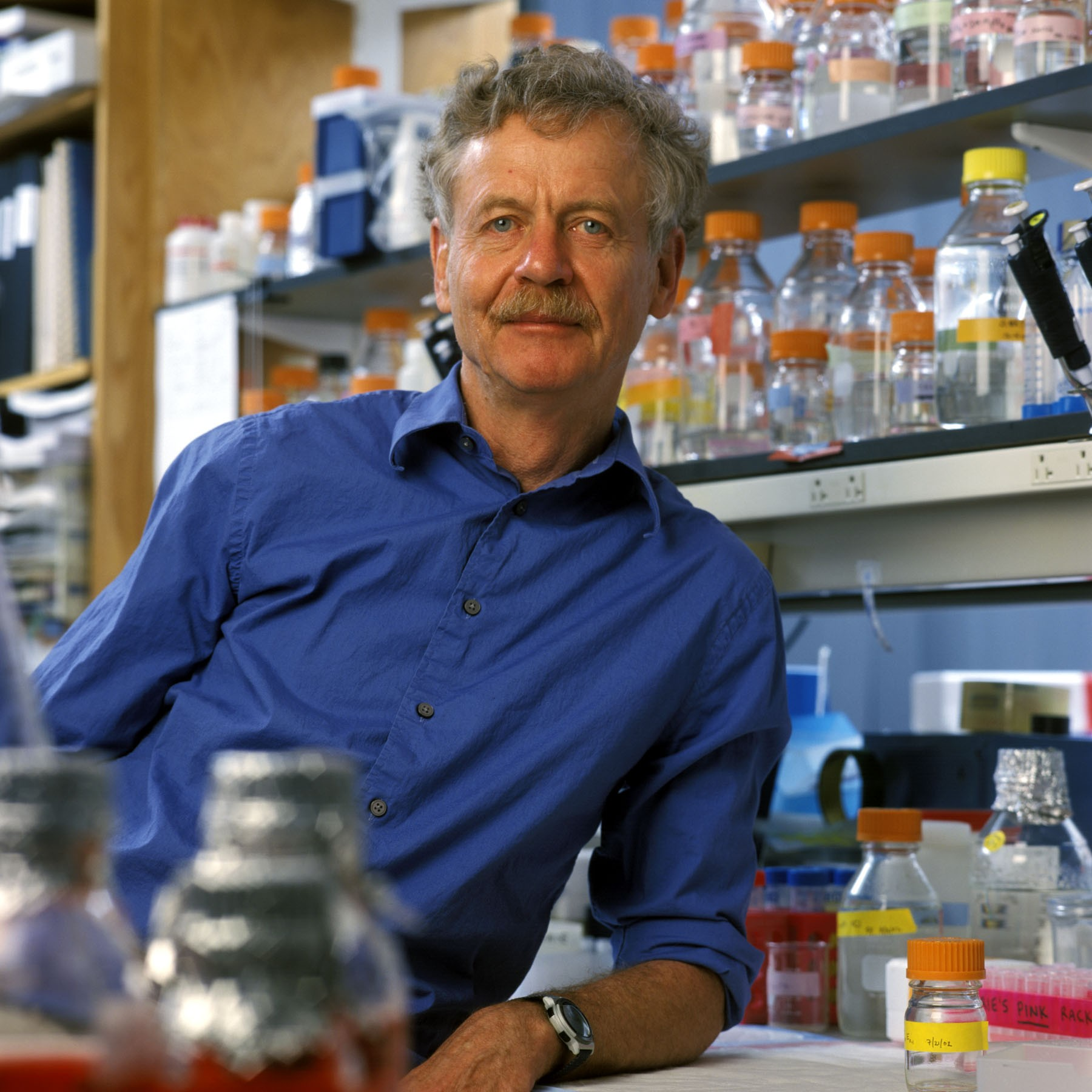
- Jaenisch in 2003
- Born: April 22, 1942 (age 84); Wölfelsgrund, Germany (now Międzygórze, Poland)
- Citizenship: German
- Education: LMU Munich (M.D., 1967)
- Known for: Epigenetic mechanisms of gene regulation; Therapeutic cloning; Embryonic stem cell research
- Awards: Gruber Prize in Genetics (2001); Robert Koch Prize (2002); Max Delbrück Medal (2006); Massry Prize from the Keck School of Medicine (2008); Wolf Prize in Medicine (2011); National Medal of Science (2011)
- Scientific career
- Fields: Biochemistry; Genetics; Medicine
- Workplaces: Max Planck Institute of Biochemistry; Princeton University; Fox Chase Cancer Center; Salk Institute; Heinrich Pette Institute; University of Hamburg; Whitehead Institute for Biomedical Research; Massachusetts Institute of Technology
- Academic advisors: Arnold Levine
- Website: wi.mit.edu/people/faculty/jaenisch

Rudolf Jaenisch (born April 22, 1942) is a professor of biology at the Massachusetts Institute of Technology and a founding member of the Whitehead Institute for Biomedical Research,as well as a member of the National Academy of Sciences. He is a pioneer of transgenic science, in which an animal's genetic makeup is altered. Jaenisch has focused on creating genetically modified mice to study cancer, epigenetic reprogramming and neurological diseases.

== Research ==
Jaenisch's first breakthrough occurred in 1974, when he and Beatrice Mintz showed that foreign DNA could be integrated into the DNA of early mouse embryos They injected retrovirus DNA into early mouse embryos and showed that leukemia DNA sequences had integrated into the mouse genome and also into that of its offspring. These mice were the first transgenic mammals in history.

His current research focuses on the epigenetic regulation of gene expression, which has led to major advances in creating embryonic stem cells and "induced pluripotent stem" (IPS) cells, as well as their therapeutic applications. In 2007, Jaenisch's laboratory was one of the first three laboratories worldwide to report reprogramming cells taken from a mouse's tail into IPS cells. Jaenisch has since shown therapeutic benefits of IPS cell-based treatment for sickle-cell anemia and Parkinson's disease in mice. Additional research focuses on the epigenetic mechanisms involved in cancer and brain development.

Jaenisch's therapeutic cloning research deals exclusively with mice, but he is an advocate for using the same techniques with human cells in order to advance embryonic stem cell research. In fact, Jaenisch states in his research how he believes that the idea is there. Jaenisch claims, "This is a proof-of-principle experiment, which shows that nuclear transplantation therapy may be possible for human application". However, in 2001, Jaenisch made a public case against human reproductive cloning, testifying before a U.S. House of Representatives subcommittee and writing an editorial in Science magazine.

== Career ==
Jaenisch received his doctorate in medicine from LMU Munich in 1967, preferring the laboratory to the clinic. He became a postdoc at the Max Planck Institute of Biochemistry in Munich, studying bacteriophages. He left Germany in 1970 for research positions at Princeton University, Fox Chase Institute for Cancer Research and the Salk Institute. He returned to Germany in 1977 to become the head of the Department of Tumor Virology at the Heinrich Pette Institute at the University of Hamburg. He arrived at MIT in 1984. He participated in the 2005 science conference on human cloning at the United Nations and serves on the science advisory boards of the Genetics Policy Institute and Stemgent. He also served on the Life Sciences jury for the Infosys Prize in 2010.

== Awards and honors ==
- 2001 Inaugural Genetics Prize of the Gruber Foundation
- 2002 Robert Koch Prize
- 2003 Election as a member of U.S. National Academy of Sciences
- 2006 Max Delbrück Medal
- 2007 Vilcek Prize in Biomedical Science
- 2008 Massry Prize from the Keck School of Medicine
- 2009 Ernst Schering Prize
- 2010 National Medal of Science
- 2011 Wolf Prize in Medicine
- 2012 International Society for Stem Cell Research McEwen Innovation Award
- 2013 Benjamin Franklin Medal in Life Science from the Franklin Institute
- 2013 Passano Award
- 2014 Otto Warburg Medal
- 2015 March of Dimes Prize in Developmental Biology
- 2016 Semantic Scholar AI program included Jaenisch on its list of top ten most influential biomedical researchers.
- 2025 Ogawa-Yamanaka Stem Cell Prize
- 2025 ISTT Prize
- 2026 Research.com's Best Scientists Award
