= Niko Beerenwinkel =

German mathematician

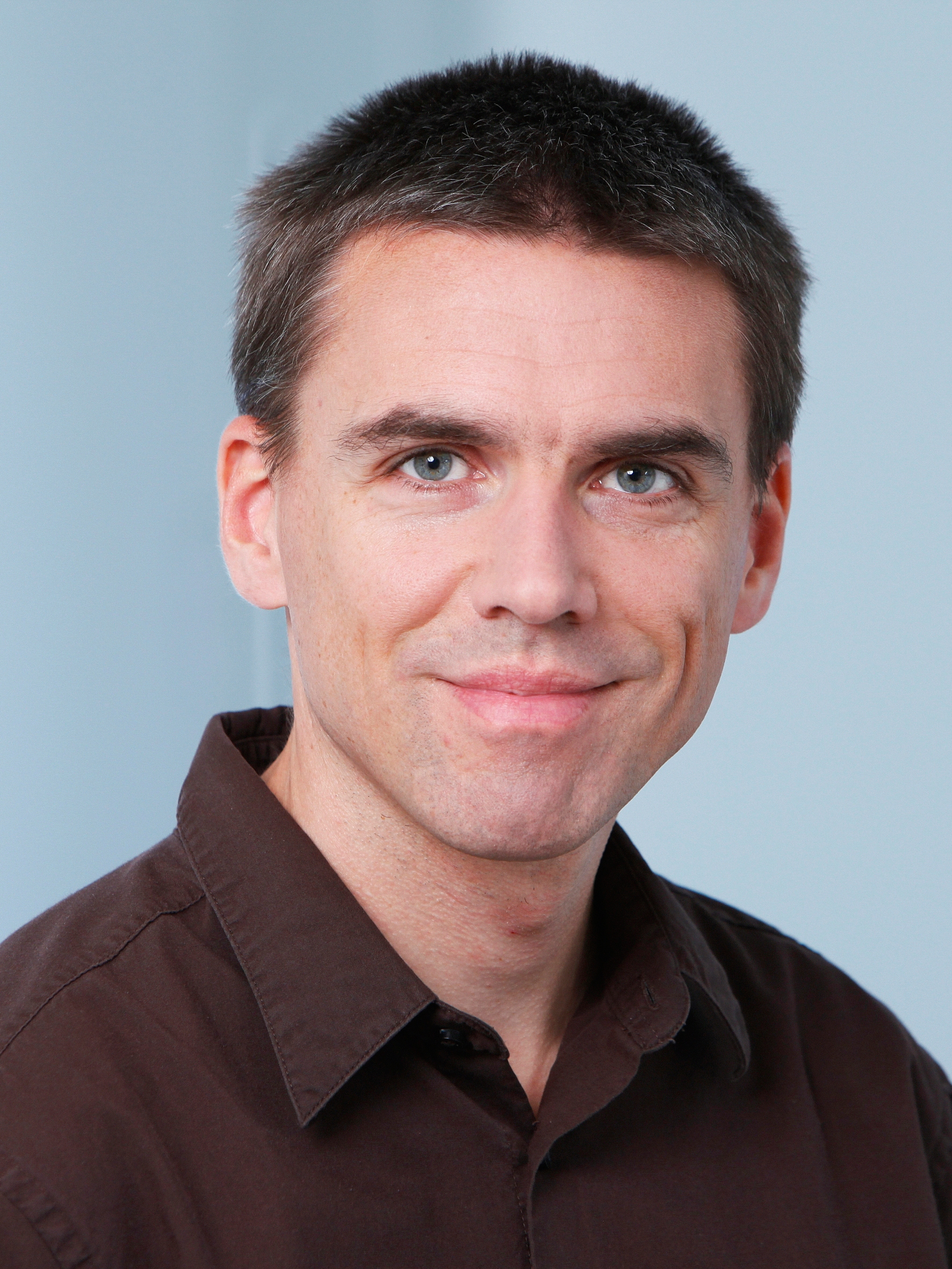
Niko Beerenwinkel (2014)

Niko Beerenwinkel, Ph.D. (2004), is a German mathematician who is active in the field of computational biology; he is an associate professor of the ETH Zurich since April 2013.

== Awards ==
- Otto Hahn Medal - Max Planck Society (2005);
- Emmy Noether Fellowship - German National Science Foundation.

== Literature ==
- Millionen-Segen für Basler Krebsforschung // Basler Zeitung - 18 December 2013.
- Niko Beerenwinkel erhält Otto-Hahn-Medaille // MEDICA Magazin - 2005.
