= Rainer Mauersberger =

German astronomer

Rainer Mauersberger (born 3 March 1957) is a German astronomer. His main field of interest is observational molecular spectroscopy of the interstellar matter in galactic and extragalactic star forming regions; millimeter and sub-millimeter astronomy. He is the scientific coordinator of the International Max Planck Research School (IMPRS) for Astronomy and Astrophysics, a collaboration between the Max Planck Institute for Radio Astronomy in Bonn and the Universities of Bonn and Cologne. He teaches as a Privatdozent (lecturer) at Bonn University. He received his PhD from the University of Bonn using the Max Planck Institute for Radio Astronomy Effelsberg 100-m Radio Telescope to measure ammonia throughout the galaxy. The galactic and extragalactic cold interstellar medium remained his main field of investigation while he was working at the Sub-mm Telescope Observatory in Arizona and IRAM 30m telescope in Granada (Spain), where he served as the station manager for nine years.

His Scientific awards and honors include the following:

- 1992: Bennigsen Foerder research prize of the Land Northrhine Westphalia
- 1987: Otto Hahn Medal and prize fellowship of the Max Planck Society
