= René Schwarzenbach =

Swiss chemist

René P. Schwarzenbach (born 18 December 1945) in Erlenbach is a Swiss chemist. He is professor emeritus of environmental chemistry and a former head of the department of environmental sciences at the ETH Zürich.

Schwarzenbach received his Ph.D. 1973 at the department of chemistry at the ETH Zürich. In 1977 he has accepted a position at the Swiss Federal Institute of Aquatic Science and Technology (Eawag), where he worked until 2006. Since 2000 he has been listed in the database of Highly Cited Researchers published by the Institute for Scientific Information (ISI). In 2001 he received the SETAC Environmental Education Award. In 2006 he received the Award for Creative Advances in Environmental Science & Technology from the American Chemical Society. A special issue of the ACS journal Environmental Science & Technology was devoted to Schwarzenbach in July 2013.

== Selected publications ==
- René P. Schwarzenbach; Philip M. Gschwend; Dieter M. Imboden (2016). Environmental Organic Chemistry (3rd ed.). Somerset: John Wiley & Sons, Incorporated. ISBN 978-1-118-76704-7. OCLC 969636996.
- Rene P. Schwarzenbach; Philip M. Gschwend; Dieter M. Imboden (2003). Environmental Organic Chemistry (2nd ed.). Hoboken, N.J.: Wiley-Interscience. ISBN 0-471-35053-2. OCLC 50598231.
