= Sungshin Women's University =

South Korean private women's university

Coordinates: 37.5913°N 127.0221°E

- 성신여자대학교
- Motto: Sincerity, Intelligence, Independence
- Type: Private
- Established: 1936; 90 years ago
- Founder: Dr. Sook-Chong Lee
- President: Seung Keun Yi, Ph.D. (이성근)
- Administrative staff: 682
- Students: 13,000
- Location: Seongbuk, Seoul, South Korea
- Campus: 30.5 acres (12.3 ha); Urban
- Website: http://www.sungshin.ac.kr/

Korean name
- Hangul: 성신여자대학교
- Hanja: 誠信女子大學校
- RR: Seongsin yeoja daehakgyo
- MR: Sŏngsin yŏja taehakkyo

Sungshin Women's University (Korean: 성신여자대학교) is a private women's university located in Seongbuk-gu, Seoul, South Korea. It was founded by Dr. Sook-Chong Lee in 1936. The university comprises ten colleges and five graduate schools, with total enrollment of about 12,000 students.

== History ==
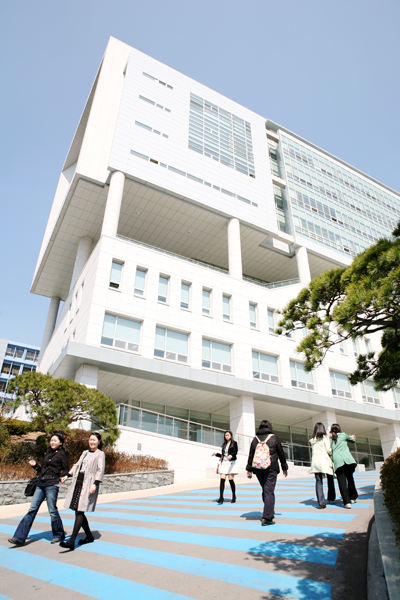
Sungshin Women's University

Sungshin Girls' School is established by Dr. Lee Sook Chong on April 28, 1936. From 1965 to 1979, this school expanded fast with the establishment of Sungshin Women's Teachers College in January 1965, Sungshin Graduate School in January 1972 and Sungshin Graduate School of Information and Industries in December 1979.

On 18 October 1979, Sungshin Girls' School changed the name to Sungshin Women's College. On 31 July 1981, the college is promoted to the status of university. After received university status, Sungshin Women's University reorganized the courses and experienced new establishment of the Colleges of Humanities, Social Sciences, Natural Sciences, Education, and Arts.

In October 1982, the College of Natural Sciences is divided and reorganized into the College of Family Sciences (now College of Human Ecology)

1983.10.29 The Graduate School of Education is established

1988.08.30 Dedication of the Woonjung Building.

1988.10.29 The College of Arts was divided into the College of Music and College of Fine Arts

1994.10.21 The Graduate School of Industry was divided into the Graduate School of Plastic Industry (Graduate School of Arts and Design) and the Graduate School of Information Industry (Graduate School of Cultural Industry)

1995.01.10 Dedication of the Soo-Jung Building

1995.03.01 The Continuing Education Center is established.

1997.10.25 The Graduate School of Human Resource Management is established.

1999.02.12 The Ministry of Education's Overall University Evaluation ranked Sungshin's undergraduate program as "excellent" and its graduate program as "most excellent"

1995.01.10 Dedication of the Nan-Hyang Building

2003.09.21 Dedication of the Media Information Center

In 2003, Sungshin Women's University was awarded the "ISO 9001:2000 Certification for Academic and Business Management Systems". This university was elected by the Ministry of Human Resources and Education for 3 consecutive years (2004, 2005 and 2006) as a "University of Excellence with a Distinctive Project."

2005.01.20 The opening of the Family Health & Welfare Center

2006.02.20 The Ministry of Education's Overall University Evaluation ranked Sungshin's undergraduate program as "excellent" and its graduate program as "excellent."

2006.11.30 Dedication of the Sungshin Building

2007.03.01 Establishment of the College of Nursing

2007.08.11 Inauguration of the eighth university president, Dr. Shim Hwa-jin

2008.04.15 Proclamation of a Vision — Construction of Sungshin Woonjung Campus (SSWU Second Campus)

2017.02.07 President Shim Hwa-jin is convicted by a Seoul court of embezzling school funds and is subsequently imprisoned.

2018.01.23 President Kim Ho-syung announces plans to discuss making the university co-educational and using trading name Sungshin University without women's in their English name for preparing co-educational system.

== Academics ==
Sungshin Women's University comprises 45 departments in ten colleges, and five graduate schools. The university also offers 5-year combined Bachelors-Masters program.

=== Undergraduate colleges ===
- College of Humanities
- College of Social Sciences
- College of Law
- College of Natural Sciences
- College of Human Ecology
- College of Nursing
- College of Education
- College of Arts
- College of Music
- College of Convergence Culture and Arts

=== Second campus (Woonjung Green Campus) ===
Sungshin has established a second campus in Seoul. The 54,200 m^{2} Woonjung Green Campus is within 5 kilometers of the Soojung Campus and makes Sungshin the only university with two campuses in Seoul.

The Woonjung Green Campus, with three college buildings and one shared facilities building opened in March 2010 and houses four colleges: College of Natural Sciences, College of Human Ecology, College of Nursing, and College of Convergence Culture and Arts. Woonjung Green Campus.

=== Public transit access ===
Sungshin Women's University is located at a transportation hub, with both campuses near major subway stations. The north-running Ui-Sinseol Rapid Transit Light metro line opened in 2017 and connected to Sungshin Women's University Station.

Sungshin Women's University Station (Soojung Campus); Mia Station (Woonjung Green Campus)

== Special Programs ==
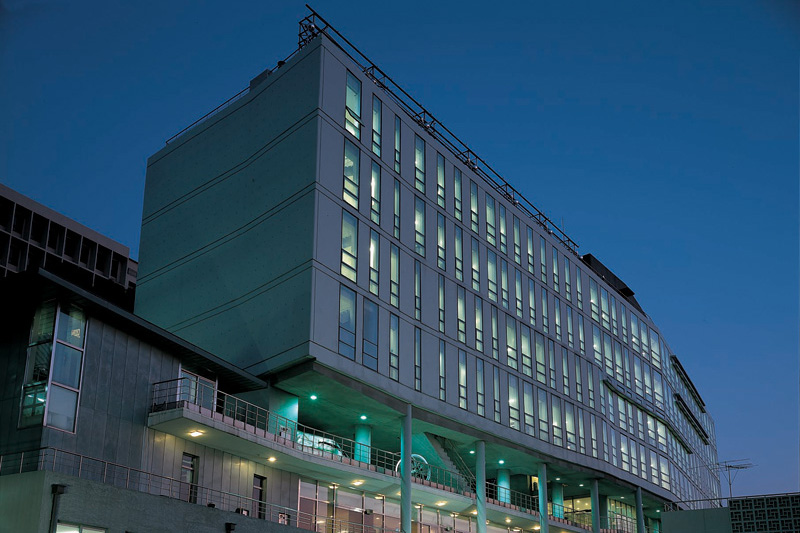
Sungshin Women's University

=== ROTC ===
Sungshin Women's University has run a Reserve Officers' Training Corps programme for women who want to be recruited as service members by the Ministry of National Defense since 2011. Similar programmes are run by Sookmyung Women's University and Ewha Womans University; these three women's universities saw a total of 90 students join the programme in 2016.

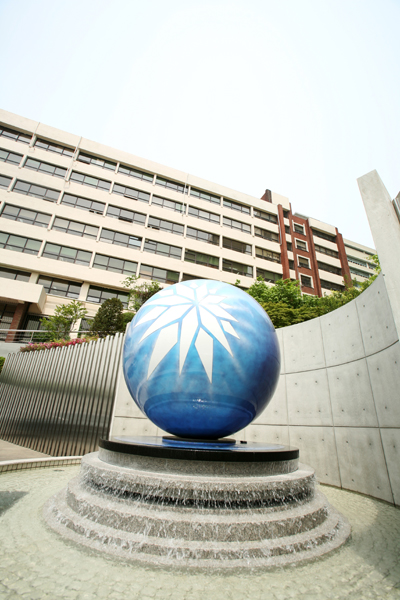
Sungshin Women's University

== Controversy ==
Shim Hwa-jin, the granddaughter of founder Li Suk-jong, served as the university's president from 2007 for two terms. When she was once more elected as president for a third term, which would extend her incumbency to 2019, four members of the university's student association raised concerns that Shim had embezzled funds from the school, which led to their suspension in January 2016. The students successfully pursued a court case to have the suspension overturned, and it was struck down in October. Meanwhile, investigative journalists found that a prominent individual's daughter had been admitted to Sungshin after cheating in the assessment, while one of Shim's relatives had also been appointed as a tenure-track lecturer using a plagiarised dissertation.

Charges of embezzlement were brought against Shim and, on 7 February 2017, the Seoul Northern District Court returned a guilty verdict, concluding that Shim had embezzled 378 million won from school funds. She was demoted from her position as president and served nine days in prison before posting bail of 50 million won on 20 February. She was succeeded as president of Sungshin Women's University by Kim Ho-sung.

== Notable alumni ==
- Shim Hwa-jin, president of the university 2007–2017

=== Entertainers ===
- Gong Seung-yeon, actress
- Goo Hara, actress and singer (KARA)
- Kimera, singer
- Lee Se-young, actress
- Yoon Chae-kyung, singer (Puretty, April, I.B.I and C.I.V.A)
- Kim Chaewon, singer (April)
- Kim So-won, actress and singer (GFriend)
- Yuju, singer (GFriend)
- Kim Yoon-ah, singer (Jaurim)
- Hyolyn, singer (Sistar)
- Soyou, singer (Sistar)
- Shin Do-hyun, actress
- Park Se-hyun, actress

=== Athletes ===
- Jang Mi-ran, 2008 Summer Olympics gold medalist (weightlifting women's category (75 kg. and up))
- Nam Hyun-hee, 2008 Summer Olympics silver medalist (fencing women's foil)

== Ranking ==
- QS World University Rankings 2023: 591–600
- QS Asia University Rankings 2025: 294
