= Irving Weissman =

American scientist

- Born: October 21, 1939; Great Falls, Montana
- Education: Stanford University; Montana State University
- Scientific career
- Workplaces: McLaughlin Research Institute; Montana Deaconess Hospital; Stanford University

Irving Lerner "Irv" Weissman (born Great Falls, Montana, October 21, 1939) is a Professor of Pathology and Developmental Biology at Stanford University where he is the Founding Director of the Stanford Institute of Stem Cell Biology and Regenerative Medicine.

Weissman was raised in Great Falls, Montana and started his scientific career at the McLaughlin Research Institute there. He obtained his MD from Stanford University in 1965 after earning a BS from Montana State University in 1961. His research has since focused on hematopoietic stem cell biology.

== Early life ==
Weissman was not an exceptionally good student in high school. He started assisting with medical research in 1956, when he got a summer job at Montana Deaconess Hospital. He preferred the idea of caring for laboratory mice and assisting in the lab to washing cars or similar jobs that were available to teenaged boys in the area. He was inspired by the idea that he could think scientifically and respond to a questioning, Socratic method, rather than didactic lectures about scientific facts. He ran his first experiment there during his senior year in high school, to see whether he could repeat an experiment that had recently been published. He attributes his admission to college and medical school to the resulting publications, rather than to his less-than-perfect grades.

== Awards ==
His awards include election to the National Academy of Sciences in 1989, named California Scientist of the Year in 2002, and elected to the American Philosophical Society in 2008.

- 2008 Robert Koch Prize
- 2009 Rosenstiel Award
- 2013 Max Delbrück Medal
- 2015 McEwen Innovation Award, International Society for Stem Cell Research
- 2015 Charles Rodolphe Brupbacher Prize
- 2019 Albany Medical Center Prize
- 2022 Wallace H. Coulter Award for Lifetime Achievement in Hematology
- 2024 American Computer & Robotics Museum Stibitz-Wilson Award

== Research focus ==
Weissman developed methods to identify stem cells, and has extensively researched stem cells and progenitor cells. His research focus is "the phylogeny and developmental biology of the cells that make up the blood-forming and immune system." Weissman is widely recognized as the "father of hematopoiesis" since he was the first to purify blood forming stem cells in both mice and humans. His laboratory purified stem cells from other mature cells, such as B cells, by distinguishing the different lineage markers expressed by each immune cell type. So when the immune cells of mice reacted with fluorescently labeled antibodies specific to effector cells, the mature cells were differentiated from the blood-forming stem cells. His work has contributed to the understanding of how a single hematopoietic stem cell can give rise to specialized blood cells.

Weissman is also a leading expert in the field of cancer stem cell biology, where his work sheds light on the understanding of the pathogenesis of multiple human malignancies. He is also known for brain-forming stem cell research in which human brain cells are grown in the brains of mice.
