= Mary Lidstrom =

American microbiologist

Mary E. Lidstrom
- Born: 1951 (age 74–75); Prineville, Oregon, USA
- Education: University of Wisconsin
- Scientific career
- Fields: Microbiology
- Workplaces: University of Washington
- Thesis: The regulation of C-1 metabolism in Methylobacterium organophilum (1977)
- Website: depts.washington.edu/mllab/mLidstrom.php

Mary E. Lidstrom is a professor of microbiology at the University of Washington. She also holds the Frank Jungers Chair of Engineering, in the Department of Chemical Engineering. She currently is a fellow of the American Academy of Microbiology, a member of the National Academy of Sciences and serves on the editorial boards of the Journal of Bacteriology and FEMS Microbial Ecology.

== Education ==
Lidstrom received a B.S. degree in microbiology from Oregon State University and an M.S. and PhD in Bacteriology from the University of Wisconsin-Madison.

== Research career ==
Lidstrom's work spans microbial physiology and natural complex microbial communities and has applications to biotechnology. Specifically, she has worked extensively on methylotroph bacteria that grow on one-carbon compounds.

After conducting her doctorate research on C-1 metabolism in Methylobacterium organophilum, Lidstrom undertook post-doctoral research at University of Sheffield UK with J. Rodney Quayle on species of the methylotrophic yeasts Hansenula and Candida, and then returned to the US with faculty posts at the University of Washington, University of Wisconsin-Milwaukee and the California Institute of Technology where she has taught courses on microbiology, oceanography, environmental engineering science, chemical engineering and bioengineering. While at Caltech she served as vice-chair of the Faculty. In 1996 she moved to University of Washington and has remained there.

Lidstrom is a fellow of the American Academy of Microbiology and a member of the National Academy of Sciences from 2013. Lidstrom was the Vice Provost of Research at the University of Washington from 2005 until 2021. In addition, she served as Associate Dean for New Initiatives in Engineering from 1997 to 2005 and Interim Provost from 2010 to 2011.

== Publications ==
Lidstrom is the author or co-author of over 300 scientific publications. These include:

- Yanning Zheng, Derek F. Harris, Yu Zheng and 9 further authors including Mary E. Lidstrom (2018) A pathway for biological methane production using bacterial iron-only nitrogenase. Nature Microbiology 3 (3) 281–286
- Frances Chu and Mary E. Lidstrom (2016) XoxF acts as the predominant methanol dehydrogenase in the type I methanotroph Methylomicrobium buryatense. American Society for Microbiology 8 (198) 1317–1325
- Mary E. Lidstrom and Michael C. Konopka (2010) The role of physiological heterogeneity in microbial population behavior. Nature Chemical Biology 6 (10) 705–712
- Ludmila Chistoserdova, Marina G. Kalyuzhnaya and Mary E. Lidstrom (2009) The Expanding World of Methylotrophic Metabolism. Annual Review of Microbiology 63 477–499

== Honors ==
- American Society for Microbiology Procter & Gamble Award for Applied and Environmental Microbiology, 2013
- Member of National Academy of Sciences, 2013
- Howard Hughes Medical Center for Learning at the Life Science/Engineering Boundary Award, 2010
- ASM Graduate Microbiology Teaching and Mentoring Award, 2006
- American Association for the Advancement of Science Fellow, 2005
- American Academy of Microbiology, 1992
- NSF Faculty Award for Women, 1991
