= Max Planck Institute for Molecular Biomedicine =

Molecular biology institute

Coordinates: 51°58′5″N 7°35′27″E

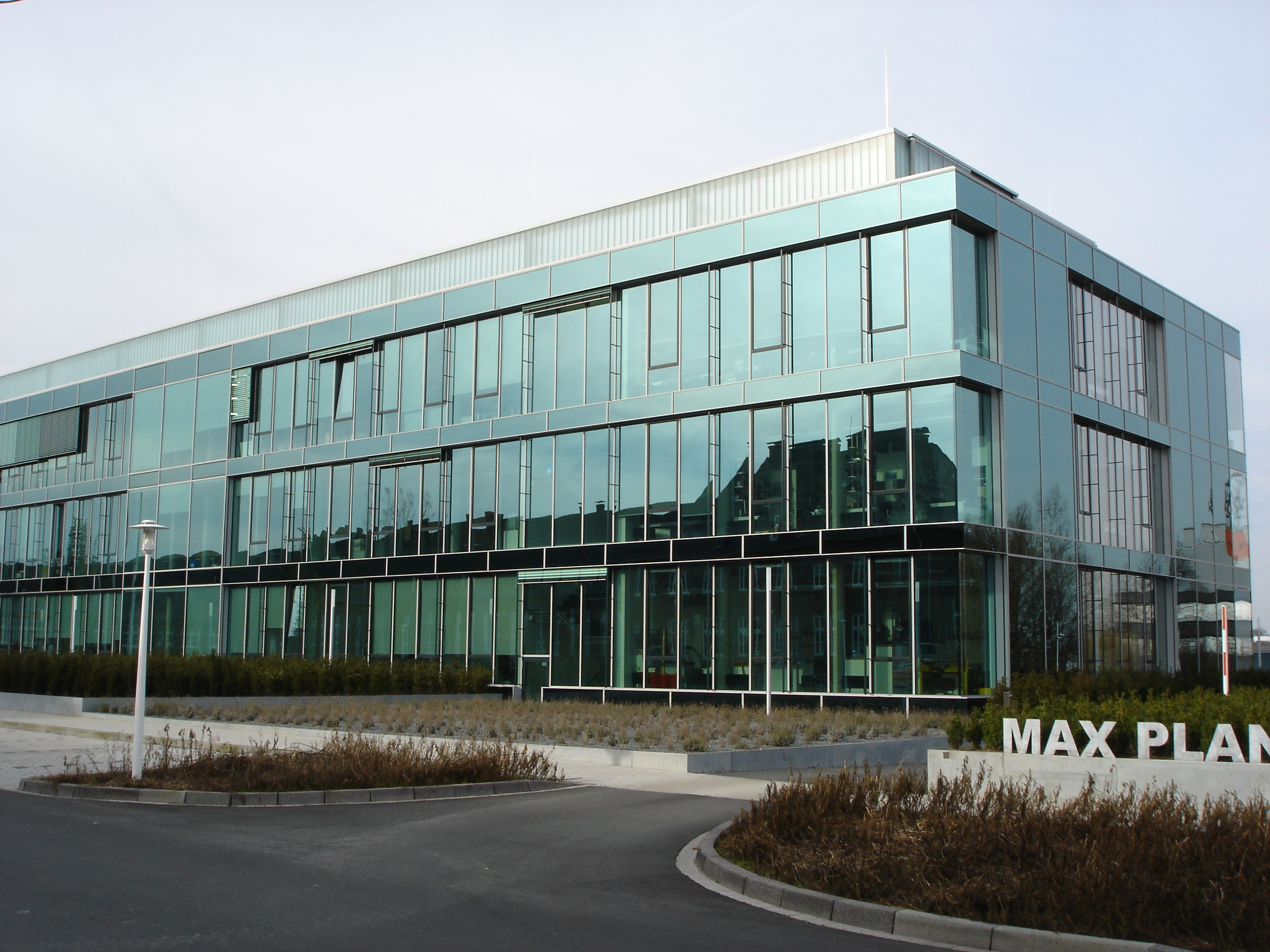
Building of the institute at the Röntgenstrasse in Münster.

The Max Planck Institute for Molecular Biomedicine was founded on 1 April 2001 (25 years ago) in Münster, North Rhine-Westphalia, Germany. It is part of the Max Planck Society. The current managing director is Prof. Sara Wickström.

== History ==
The Institute was founded on 1 April 2001 (25 years ago) in Münster, Germany. Founding director was Prof. Dr. Dietmar Vestweber. In 2004, another department was added (Prof. Dr. Hans Robert Schöler). In the same year, the institute got its current name: Max Planck Institute for Molecular Biomedicine. In 2006 the institute moved to a new and modern building offering more space and equipment. At the end of 2007 another department was added (Prof. Dr. Ralf H. Adams). This department moved from the Cancer Research UK London Research Institute to the MPI. With the retirement of Hans Robert Schöler at the end of October 2021, who continued to work with a research group at the Institute, Prof. Sara Wickström was appointed as a new Director at the Institute as of November 2021.

== Departments ==
- Department of Vascular Cell Biology (Director: Prof. Dr. Dietmar Vestweber); since 1 August 2001
- Department of Tissue Morphogenesis (Director: Prof. Dr. Ralf Adams); since 1 October 2007
- Department Cell and Tissue Dynamics (Director: Prof. Dr. Sara Wickström, MD PhD); since 1 November 2021

== Research ==
=== Department of Vascular Cell Biology ===
The Department of Vascular Cell Biology is concentrating its research on leukocyte migration into inflammatory sites.

=== Department of Tissue Morphogenesis ===
The Department of Tissue Morphogenesis works on how cells make tissue, in particular blood vessels.

=== Department of Cell and Tissue Dynamics ===
The Department of Cell and Tissue Dynamics works on regulatory principles of tissue architecture.

== Degree programme ==
- The MPI for Molecular Biomedicine offers a Master of Science and a PhD in Molecular Biomedicine together with the University of Münster. Both degree programmes are taught in English.
