= Ralf Adams =

German biochemist

Ralf Heinrich Adams (born 1966) is a biochemist and cell biologist. He is director at the Max Planck Institute for Molecular Biomedicine and head of the Department of Tissue Morphogenesis in Münster, Germany.

In 2000 Adams became head of the Vascular Development Laboratory at the Cancer Research UK London Research Institute (formerly, Imperial Cancer Research Fund) and Honorary Senior Research Fellow at the University College London.

Since 2007 Adams is Professor for ‘Vascular Biology’ at the Westfälische Wilhelms University and Director at the MPI for Molecular Biomedicine in Münster, Germany.

He is a member of the Editorial Board for Genes & Development.
