= Günter Blobel =

German-American biologist (1936–2018)

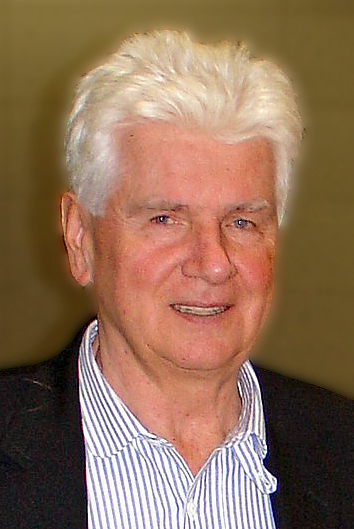
- Günter Blobel at MPI-CBG symposium, November 2008
- Born: 21 May 1936; Waltersdorf, Germany (now Niegosławice, Poland)
- Died: 18 February 2018 (aged 81); New York City, New York, U.S.
- Citizenship: German; American
- Education: University of Kiel; University of Tübingen (M.D.); University of Wisconsin–Madison (Ph.D.)
- Known for: Gene gating hypothesis Protein targeting Signal recognition particle
- Awards: NAS Award in Molecular Biology (1978); Canada Gairdner International Award (1982); Otto Warburg Medal (1983); Richard Lounsbery Award (1983); E.B. Wilson Medal (1986); Keith R. Porter Lecture (1986); Louisa Gross Horwitz Prize (1987); Max Delbrück Medal (1992); Albert Lasker Award for Basic Medical Research (1993); Ciba-Drew Award (1995); King Faisal Prize (1996); Mayor's Award (1997); Nobel Prize in Physiology or Medicine (1999); Massry Prize (1999); Mendel Lecture (2012)
- Scientific career
- Fields: Biology
- Workplaces: Rockefeller University
- Academic advisors: George Palade
- Doctoral students: Peter Walter
- Other notable students: David J. Anderson; André Hoelz

Günter Blobel (German pronunciation: [ˈɡʏntɐ ˈbloːbl̩]; May 21, 1936 – February 18, 2018) was a Silesian German and American biologist and 1999 Nobel Prize laureate in Physiology for the discovery that proteins have intrinsic signals that govern their transport and localization in the cell.

== Education and early life ==
Günter Blobel was born in Waltersdorf in the Prussian Province of Lower Silesia, then located in eastern Germany. In January 1945 his family fled from native Silesia to Dresden to escape from the advancing Red Army. During the bombing of Dresden, Blobel, then 8, stayed with his family at a relative's farm to the west of the city. After the war, Blobel grew up and attended gymnasium in the Saxon town of Freiberg. He studied medicine and graduated from the University of Tübingen in 1960. After two years service in a medical internship, he moved to Madison, Wisconsin, following an older brother, enrolling in the University of Wisconsin–Madison and, joining the lab of Van R. Potter for his graduate work. Blobel matriculated in 1967 with a Ph.D. He then moved to Rockefeller University as a postdoctoral fellow with George Palade, and was soon appointed as a professor.

== Career and research ==
Blobel was appointed to the Howard Hughes Medical Institute in 1986. Blobel was the sole recipient of the 1999 Nobel Prize in Physiology or Medicine for the discovery of signal peptides. Signal peptides form an integral part of protein targeting, a mechanism for cells to direct newly synthesized protein molecules to their proper location by means of an "address tag" (i.e., a signal peptide) within the molecule.

Blobel died of cancer in Manhattan at New York-Presbyterian Weill Cornell Medical Center on February 18, 2018 at the age of 81. By the time of his death, Blobel was described as having "ushered cell biology into the molecular age" through his work on the fractionation and reconstitution of functional protein complexes and sub-cellular components in vitro.

=== Philanthropy ===
Blobel became well known for his direct and active support for the rebuilding of Dresden in Germany, becoming, in 1994, the founder and president of the nonprofit "Friends of Dresden, Inc." He donated all of the Nobel award money to the restoration of Dresden, in particular for the rebuilding of the Frauenkirche (completed in 2005) and the building of a new synagogue. In Leipzig he pursued a rebuilding of the Paulinerkirche, the university church of the University of Leipzig, which had been blown up by the communist regime of East Germany in 1968, arguing "this is a shrine of German cultural history, connected to the most important names in German cultural history." Gunter was also a founding member of the board of directors of Research Foundation to Cure AIDS, a U.S. not-for-profit research organization.

== Personal life ==
Blobel lost his older sister to aerial bombing of a train she was on in 1945, shortly after the bombing of Dresden, while an older brother survived the war and became a veterinarian in the United States. Blobel worked at the Rockefeller University in New York City from 1968. He lived in Manhattan's Upper East Side with his wife, Laura Maioglio (owner of Barbetta). He was on the board of directors for Nestlé and the Board of Scientific Governors at The Scripps Research Institute. Furthermore, he was Co-Founder and Chairman of the Scientific Advisory Board for Chromocell Corporation. He sat on the Selection Committee for Life Science and Medicine which chooses winners of the Shaw Prize. Blobel had a passion for opera and architecture, in addition to his passion for experimental science.

== Scientific awards ==
- 1978: NAS Award in Molecular Biology
- 1982: Gairdner Foundation International Award
- 1983: Otto Warburg Medal
- 1983: Richard Lounsbery Award
- 1983: Member of the German Academy of Sciences Leopoldina
- Member of the United States National Academy of Sciences
- 1984: Member of the American Academy of Arts and Sciences
- 1986: V. D. Mattia Award
- 1986: E.B. Wilson Medal
- 1986: Keith R. Porter Lecture
- 1987: Louisa Gross Horwitz Prize from Columbia University
- 1989: Waterford Bio-Medical Science Award
- 1989: Member of the American Philosophical Society
- 1992: Max Delbrück Medal
- 1993: Albert Lasker Award for Basic Medical Research
- 1995: Ciba Drew Award in Biomedical Research
- 1996: King Faisal International Prize
- 1997: Mayor's Award for Excellence in Science and Technology
- 1999: Massry Prize from the Keck School of Medicine, University of Southern California
- 1999: Nobel Prize in Physiology or Medicine
- 2001: Pontifical Academy of Sciences
- 2001: Pour le Mérite
- 2006: Inaugural class of winner of the Great Immigrants Award named by Carnegie Corporation of New York
- 2008: Foreign Member of the Russian Academy of Science
- 2014: AACR Academy

== See also ==
- Distinguished German-American of the Year
