= Pierre Barbet =

Pierre Barbet may refer to:

- Pierre Barbet (physician) (1884–1961), French physician
- Pierre Barbet (writer) (1925–1995), pseudonym used by French science fiction writer and pharmacist Claude Avice
