= Barbette (disambiguation) =

Barbettes are several types of gun emplacement. Barbette may also refer to:

- HMAS Barbette (P 97), a patrol boat of the Royal Australian Navy
- Barbette (performer) (1899–1973), American female impersonator, high-wire performer and trapeze artist
- Paul Barbette (1620–1666?), Dutch physician
- Barbette (headdress) a type of medieval headdress worn in the 13th century
- Barbette Mountain, a summit in the Canadian Rockies

== See also ==
- Barbet (disambiguation)
- Barbetta, Italian restaurant in New York City
