= Schläger =

Schläger or Schlaeger is a surname. Notable persons with that name include:

- Antonie Schläger (1859–1910), Austrian opera singer
- Hans Schläger (1820–1885), Austrian conductor and composer
- Marianne Schläger (1920–?), Austrian athlete
- Thorsten M. Schlaeger, German biologist

== See also ==
- Schläger, a type of sword used in academic fencing
- Schlager (surname)
