= Barbet =

Barbet may refer to:

- Barbet (dog), a dog breed
- Various birds in the infraorder Ramphastides
  - Capitonidae, the family of the New World barbets
  - Lybiidae, the family of the African barbets
  - Megalaimidae, the family of the Asian barbets
  - Semnornithidae, the family of the toucan-barbets
- USS Barbet (AMc-38), a coastal minesweeper commissioned on 29 September 1941
- USS Barbet (AMS-41), a minesweeper commissioned on 8 June 1942
- Barbet (surname)

== See also ==
- Barbette (disambiguation)
- Barbetta, Italian restaurant in New York City
