= Hernán A. Makse =

American, Argentina physicist

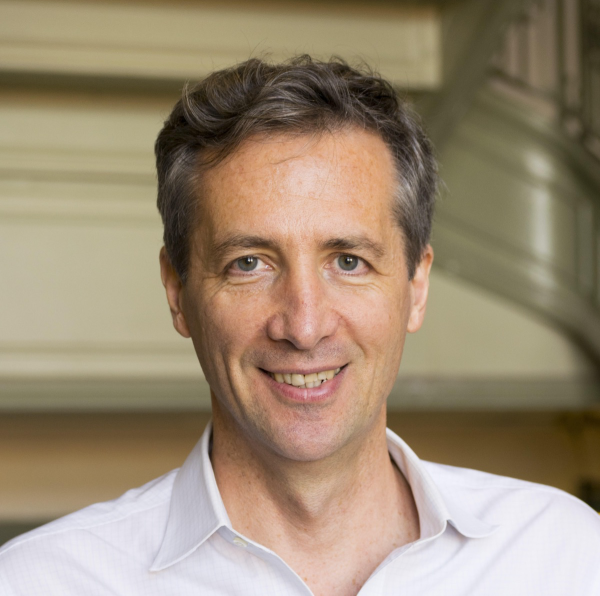
- Hernán A. Makse
- Born: 1966 (age 59–60); Buenos Aires, Argentina
- Citizenship: American. Argentine.
- Education: Boston University (PhD)
- Known for: Research on influencers, networks, symmetry fibrations, jammed matter.
- Awards: Corresponding member of the Brazilian Academy of Sciences (2023); Fellow of the American Physical Society (2012); New York City Mayor's Young Investigator Award for Excellence in Science and Technology (2005)
- Scientific career
- Fields: Statistical physics, complex networks, data science, AI
- Workplaces: City College of New York; CUNY Graduate Center
- Doctoral advisor: H. Eugene Stanley
- Website: hmakse.ccny.cuny.edu

Hernán A. Makse is an Argentine-American physicist. He is a Distinguished Professor of Physics at the City College of New York (CUNY) and he is affiliated with the Benjamin Levich Institute, where he leads the Complex Networks and Data Science Lab.

He is known for contributions to granular matter and packings, complex systems, complex networks, biological networks, and artificial intelligence, spanning from condensed matter physics to the study of cities, social media, influential spreaders, brain networks, and large language models.

== Education and career ==
Makse earned a Ph.D. in physics from Boston University under the supervision of Prof. H. E. Stanley. He held a postdoctoral positions at the Cavendish Laboratory at the University of Cambridge and the Collège de France in Paris (with Pierre-Gilles de Gennes). He was also a Postdoctoral Fellow at Schlumberger in Ridgefield, Connecticut, in the laboratory of David Linton Johnson, before joining the City College of New York (CUNY), where he is a Distinguished Professor of Physics.

He is also a professor in the CUNY Neuroscience Collaborative (Biology/Psychology PhD programs) at the CUNY Graduate Center, and serves as an Affiliate Attending Imaging Scientist at Memorial Sloan Kettering Cancer Center(Radiology/Neuroradiology) applying machine learning to cancer screening and brain imaging.

== Research ==
Early in his career, Makse and collaborators developed statistical-physics approaches to granular materials, stratification in granular mixtures, and jamming of random packings. In network science, he was among the authors who reported self-similarity and fractality in real-world networks and developed the Collective Influence algorithm and k-core decomposition to identify key spreaders in networks. Building on these tools, Makse and collaborators carried out empirical studies of influencers in social media and networks.

In biological networks, Makse and collaborators developed the symmetry-fibration framework (see Fibration) to describe structural building blocks and cluster synchronization across systems ranging from gene regulation to neural connectomes. These methods build on the categorical notion of fibration introduced by Grothendieck and later adapted to fibrations of graphs by Paolo Boldi and Sebastiano Vigna. Related work connected symmetry fibrations to machine learning and geometric deep learning, including local-symmetry perspectives for graph neural networks and deep neural networks.

== Awards and honors ==
- 2003 – Received an NSF CAREER Award for research on the statistical mechanics of particulate systems far from equilibrium.
- 2005 – Received the New York City Mayor's Young Investigator Award for Excellence in Science and Technology (New York Academy of Sciences).
- 2007 – Received a César Milstein SubProgram Subsidio (Secretaría de Ciencia y Técnica, Programa RAÍCES, Argentina).
- 2012 – Elected a Fellow of the American Physical Society.
- 2023 – Elected a corresponding member of the Brazilian Academy of Sciences.

== Books ==
- Makse, Hernán A.; Boldi, Paolo; Sorrentino, Francesco; Stewart, Ian (2026). Symmetries of Living and Artificial Intelligence Systems: Fibrations and Synchronization in Networks. Cambridge University Press. arXiv:2502.18713.
- Makse, Hernán A.; Zava, Marta (2025). The Science of Influencers and Superspreaders: Using Networks and Artificial Intelligence to Understand Fake News, Pandemics, Markets, and the Brain. Springer Cham. doi:10.1007/978-3-031-78058-5. ISBN 978-3-031-78058-5.

== Selected publications ==
- Makse, Hernán A.; Havlin, Shlomo; Stanley, H. Eugene (1995). "Modelling urban growth patterns". Nature. 377 (6550): 608–612. Bibcode:1995Natur.377..608M. doi:10.1038/377608a0.
- Makse, Hernán A.; Havlin, Shlomo; King, Peter R.; Stanley, H. Eugene (1997). "Spontaneous stratification in granular mixtures". Nature. 386 (6623): 379–382. arXiv:cond-mat/9809432. Bibcode:1997Natur.386..379M. doi:10.1038/386379a0.
- Makse, Hernán A.; Kurchan, Jorge (2002). "Testing the thermodynamic approach to granular matter with a numerical model of a decisive experiment". Nature. 415 (6872): 614–617. Bibcode:2002Natur.415..614M. doi:10.1038/415614a. PMID 11832938.
- Song, Chaoming; Havlin, Shlomo; Makse, Hernán A. (2005). "Self-similarity of complex networks". Nature. 433 (7024): 392–395. arXiv:cond-mat/0503078. Bibcode:2005Natur.433..392S. doi:10.1038/nature03248. PMID 15674285.
- Song, Chaoming; Wang, Ping; Makse, Hernán A. (2008). "A phase diagram for jammed matter". Nature. 453 (7195): 629–632. arXiv:0808.2196. Bibcode:2008Natur.453..629S. doi:10.1038/nature06981. PMID 18509438.
- Kitsak, Maksim; Gallos, Lazaros K.; Havlin, Shlomo; Liljeros, Fredrik; Muchnik, Lev; Stanley, H. Eugene; Makse, Hernán A. (2010). "Identification of influential spreaders in complex networks". Nature Physics. 6 (11): 888–893. arXiv:1001.5285. Bibcode:2010NatPh...6..888K. doi:10.1038/nphys1746.
- Morone, Flaviano; Makse, Hernán A. (2015). "Influence maximization in complex networks through optimal percolation". Nature. 524 (7563): 65–68. arXiv:1506.08326. Bibcode:2015Natur.524...65M. doi:10.1038/nature14604. PMID 26131931.
- Morone, Flaviano; Makse, Hernán A. (2019). "Symmetry group factorization reveals the structure-function relation in the neural connectome of Caenorhabditis elegans". Nature Communications. 10 (1): 4961. arXiv:1908.10923. Bibcode:2019NatCo..10.4961M. doi:10.1038/s41467-019-12675-8. PMC 6823386. PMID 31672985.
