= V Foundation =

United States nonprofit organization

- Founded: March 4, 1993; 33 years ago
- Founder: Jim Valvano
- Type: Nonprofit organization
- Legal status: 501(c)(3)
- Headquarters: Cary, North Carolina, United States
- Key people: Brandi Williams Broome (CEO)
- Revenue: $62.4M (2024)
- Expenses: $51.9M (2024)
- Website: v.org

The V Foundation for Cancer Research is a United States nonprofit organization that provides financial support for cancer research. It was founded on March 4, 1993 by Jim Valvano, a college basketball coach, a ESPN and ABC Sports broadcaster, with the aim of advancing cancer research that may lead to improvements in treatment and outcomes. Announced during Valvano's speech at the inaugural ESPY Awards, the foundation's motto is "Don't Give Up... Don't Ever Give Up!"

Headquartered in Cary, North Carolina, the foundation provides funding to early-stage researchers and established institutions across the United States. It raises funds through partnerships, donations, and events, including ESPN's annual V Week and collaborations with corporations, sports organizations, and philanthropic groups. The V Foundation distributes research grants through a peer-reviewed process led by a Scientific Review Committee, which includes experts in oncology and related fields. In addition to general cancer research, the foundation has launched initiatives focused on addressing disparities in cancer research funding.

== History and founding ==
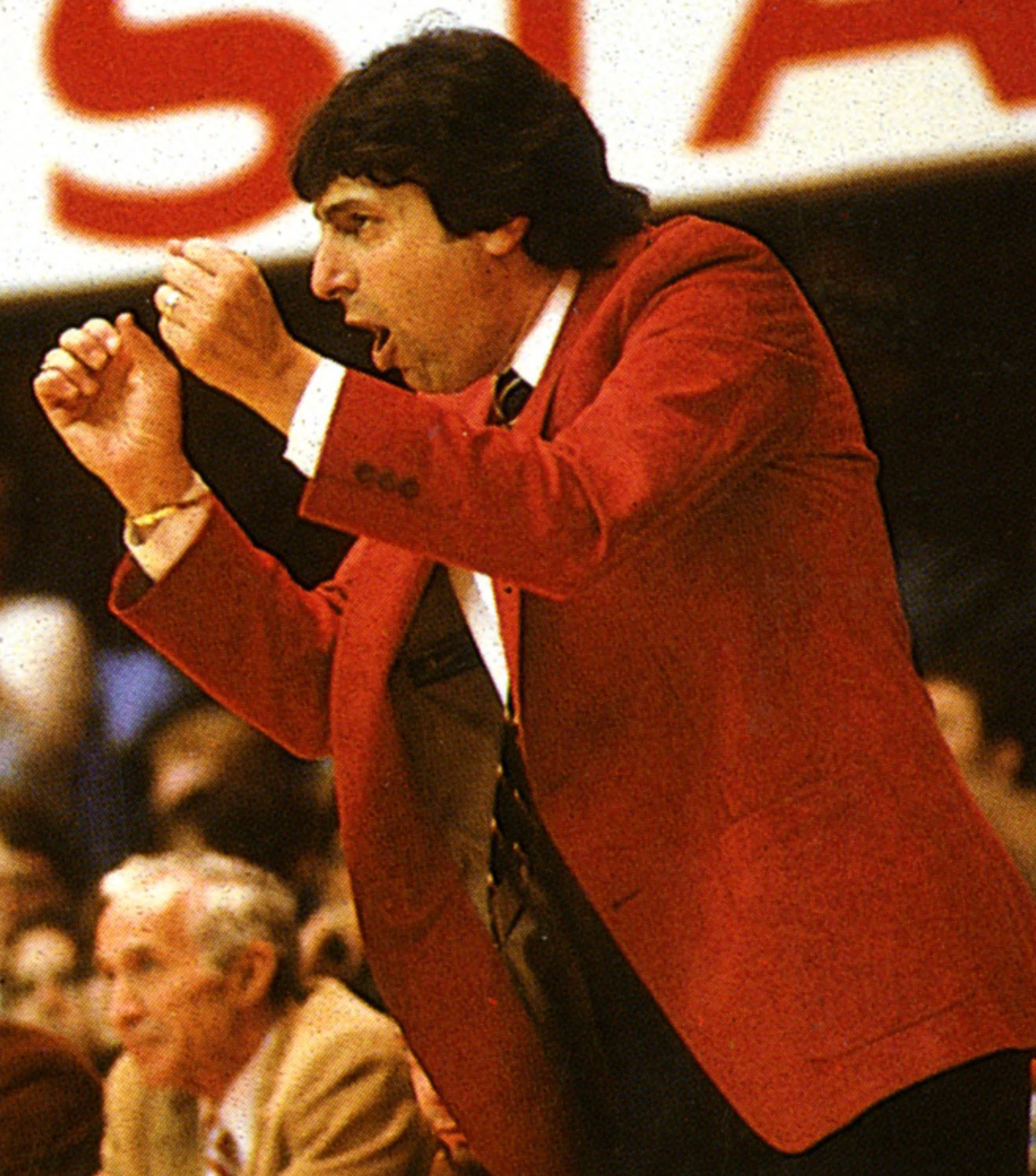
Jim Valvano coaching NC State circa 1985

In January 1993, ESPN executives Steve Bornstein and John Lack met with Jim and Pam Valvano, offering ESPN's support in creating a foundation for cancer research. Jim, who had been diagnosed with terminal metastatic adenocarcinoma on June 15, 1992, developed the initial plan on a yellow pad. On March 4, 1993, at ESPN's first ESPY Awards, Valvano announced the foundation's launch while receiving the Arthur Ashe Award for Courage. He declared its motto: "Don't Give Up... Don't Ever Give Up!" He died on April 28, 1993.

== Organization ==
Headquartered in Cary, North Carolina, the foundation is governed by a volunteer Board of Directors. John Saunders was a founding board member of the V Foundation. Other notable people involved in the V Foundation have been Dick Vitale, Mike Krzyzewski, Trey Wingo, Dereck Whittenburg, and others. The foundation is a 501(c)(3).

=== Chief executive officers ===
Valvano's brother, Nicholas, served as CEO from 1999 until 2012. Susan Braun served in the role until 2021. Shane Jacobson served in the role until August 2025. Brandi Williams Broome is the current CEO. Valvano's daughter has been involved in the foundation.

=== Scientific review committee ===
Notable past members of the foundation's scientific review committee include: Edison Liu, Karen H. Antman, Robert C. Bast, Jr., Gerold Bepler, and Ronald Levy. Others include Nancy Davidson, Carlos Arteaga, Olivera Finn, Susan Hilsenbeck, and Michael B. Kastan.

== Research grants ==
The foundation funds cancer research by awarding research grants to selected researchers, known as V Scholars, through a review process by its Scientific Review Committee. The foundation has also funded cancer research facilities.

=== Recipients ===
In 2024, two University of Texas at San Antonio Health scientists received V Foundation grants. A V Foundation grant went toward supporting childhood cancer research at University of Pittsburgh Medical Center's UPMC Children's Hospital of Pittsburgh. Two researchers at the Wistar Institute received grants in 2025.

In 2025, the foundation awarded an $800,000 grant to Kristy Brown, Ph.D., at the University of Kansas Cancer Center to study how obesity contributes to breast cancer risk and whether lifestyle changes like exercise and weight loss can prevent it by improving mitochondrial function. Salk Institute for Biological Studies Professor Diana Hargreaves received a $1 million V Foundation All-Star Translational Award to advance pancreatic cancer immunotherapy research, building on her prior work identifying SWI/SNF mutations as key to improving treatment efficacy. Andrea Kasinski, deputy director of the Purdue Institute for Cancer Research, was awarded an $800,000 V Foundation Translational Grant to develop targeted microRNA-based therapies for cancer, advancing innovative treatments toward clinical application.

=== Gender disparity grants ===
In 2024, The V Foundation selected 15 scientists nationwide for funding through its "A Grant of Her Own: The Women Scientists Innovation Award for Cancer Research" program, aimed at addressing gender disparities in cancer research.

== Fundraising ==
=== Initiatives and events ===
The foundation conducts fundraising through a variety of initiatives and events, such as "Run For Team V" and "Fundraise for the V." Bristol Myers Squibb employees and others have participated in the Coast 2 Coast 4 Cancer Ride to raise funds for the foundation. They host an annual wine celebration. The foundation hosts an annual Boo-Yah! event to honor the legacy of Stuart Scott. The Ultimate Fighting Championship (UFC) has collaborated with ESPN to fundraise.

Dick Vitale hosts an annual event to raise money and awareness for Childhood cancer. In 2025, the 20th annual Vitale Gala raised $12.5 million for the foundation, surpassing $100 million in total grants.

Each year, the Dribble for Victory Over Cancer event, hosted by UNC Athletics in partnership with the Pediatric Cancer Research Foundation and the V Foundation, raises funds for pediatric cancer research at UNC Children's Research Institute.

==== Jimmy V Classic ====
The Jimmy V Classic is an annual college basketball game organized by ESPN Events to raise money for the V Foundation and awareness for cancer research.

=== Corporate and media support ===
ESPN has supported the V Foundation through initiatives like the Tournament Challenge Marathon, a 24- to 25-hour programming event promoting bracketology during NCAA Division I men's basketball tournament while raising awareness and funds for cancer research.

In March 2016, WWE partnered with The V Foundation. Corporations, including Hooters, have partnered with the foundation to raise money.

=== Public figures, athletes, and others ===
It has received support from public figures and sports professionals. NHL captain Alex Ovechkin launched the "GR8 Chase for Victory Over Cancer" campaign, which ties his goal-scoring achievements to monetary donations for pediatric cancer research. ESPN holds an annual V Week and has helped raise millions of dollars for the foundation. In March 2021, Mat Ishbia donated $1 million to foundation. Taylor Swift has donated $100,000.

In 2024, the foundation and the Miami Dolphins Cancer Challenge (DCC) announced a fundraising partnership to support cancer research at Sylvester Comprehensive Cancer Center, part of the University of Miami Miller School of Medicine, with Serena Williams joining the collaboration.

In response to 2025 U.S. government funding cuts, Nancy Major, MD, a clinical professor, radiologist, and V Foundation board member, organized a fundraiser in Park City, Utah to support the V Foundation.

=== Fraternal and organizational ===
In 2005, the Orange Krush Foundation presented the Jimmy V Foundation with a check for $50,000. The money represented the one-millionth dollar donated in the Orange Krush Foundation's eight-year existence. In 2006, the fraternity Delta Chi named the V Foundation as its official philanthropic organization. Delta Chi has raised over one million dollars for the V foundation.

== Awards and recognition ==
The V Foundation recognizes different people for their courage and roles in cancer research.The foundation recognized Tylee Craft, a college football player, who inspired his football team and community after his diagnosis with cancer. André Hoelz was awarded the Albert Wyrick V Scholar Award.

=== Jimmy V Award ===
The Jimmy V Award trophy, designed by sculptor Lawrence Nowlan, is presented at the annual ESPY Awards ceremony in Los Angeles, California by The V Foundation.
