= Barbet (surname) =

Barbet is a surname. Notable people with this surname include:

- Henri Barbet (1789–1875), French industrialist and politician
- Matt Barbet (b. 1976), English newsreader
- Pierre Barbet (physician) (1884–1961), French physician
- Pierre Barbet (writer) or Claude Avice (1925–1995), French science fiction writer and pharmacist
