= Schleger =

Schleger is a surname. Notable people with the surname include:

- Hans Schleger (1898–1976), German-English graphic designer
- Shane Schleger (born 1977), American poker player
- Walter Schleger (1929–1999), Austrian footballer

== See also ==
- Schlager (surname)
- Schlegel
