= Heinrich Petraeus =

German physician (1589–1620)

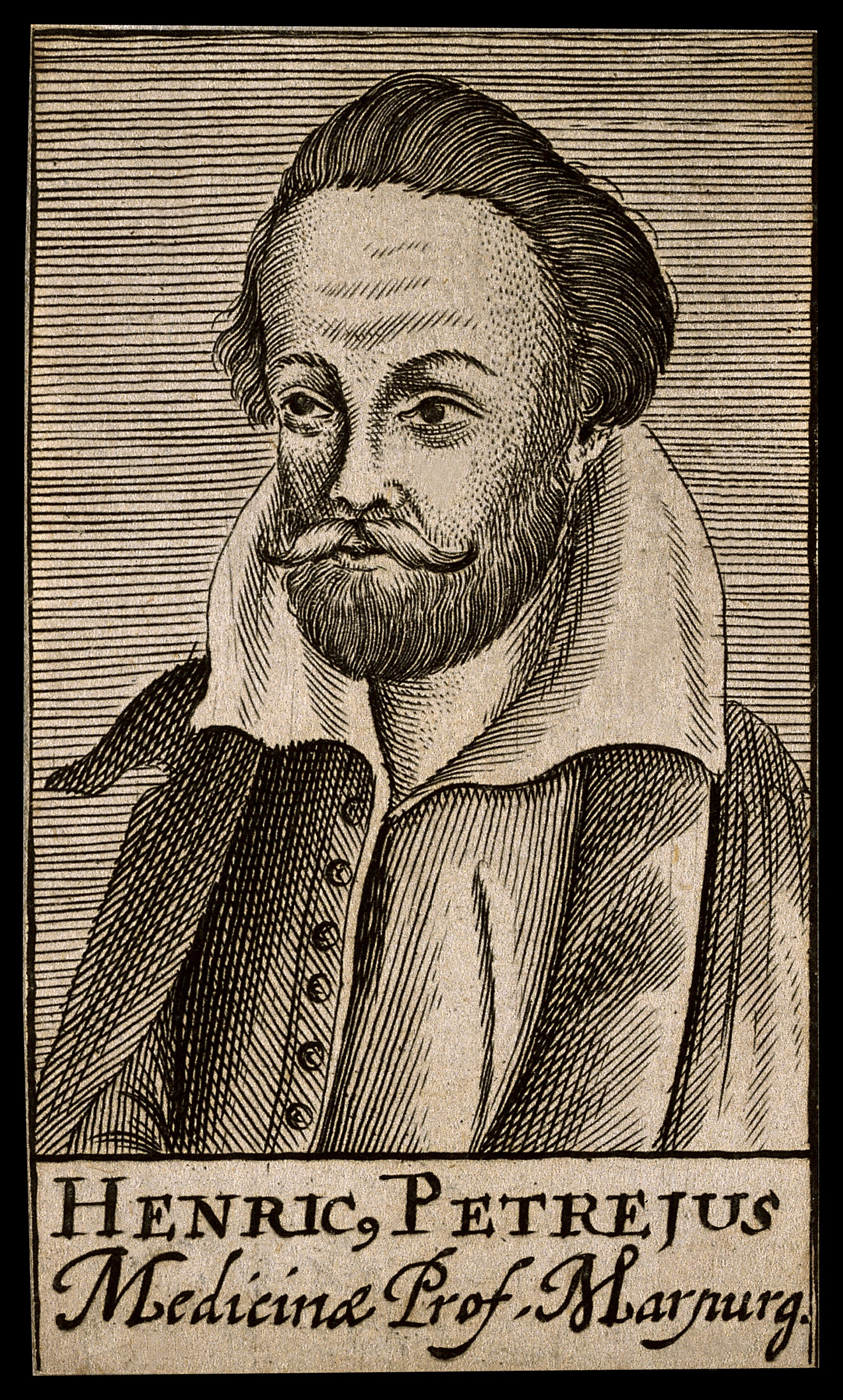
Portrait. Credit: Wellcome Collection

Heinrich Petraeus (Henricus Petraeus) (1589–1620) was a German physician and writer. He was Professor of Medicine at the University of Marburg. He was son-in-law of the chemist Johannes Hartmann (1568–1631). He is known for his Nosologia Harmonica Dogmatica et Hermetica. This was an attempt to find concord between rival medical theories of the time: those of the progressive chemical physicians (exemplified by Vesalius) and those of the tradition-based Galenists.
