= Moritz Schuppert =

American surgeon and anti-vaccinationist

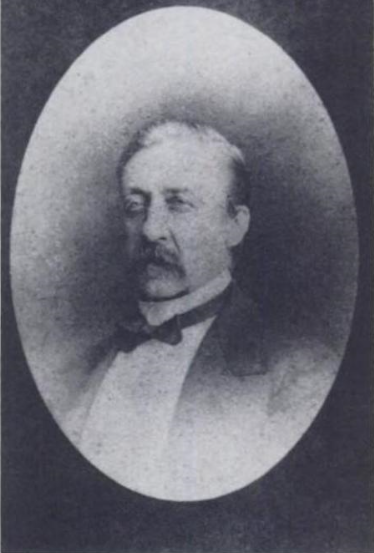
- Born: 1817; Marburg, Germany
- Died: May 2, 1887 (aged 69–70); New Orleans
- Occupations: Surgeon, writer

Moritz Schuppert (1817 – May 2, 1887) was an American surgeon, anti-vaccinationist and early advocate of antisepsis.

== Biography ==
Schuppert was born in Marburg, Germany. He studied medicine at the University of Marburg. He emigrated to New Orleans during the 1853 yellow fever epidemic. Schuppert was influential in introducing antisepsis into New Orleans from his studies in Germany. Schuppert became a leading surgeon in New Orleans who used antiseptic techniques at Charity Hospital. He became city physician of New Orleans in 1854.

In the 1860s, Schuppert reported a series of operations he performed for vesicovaginal fistula with and without anaesthesia. He was struck by how well the patients tolerated the procedures.

Schuppert came out against vaccination stating that it was inefficient and had caused many deaths. In 1879, Schuppert was assigned to vaccinate girls at Upper District High School. Instead, he showed them the arm of a friend who had contracted erysipelas from vaccination. This horrified the girls that they refused to be vaccinated. Schuppert complimented the students on their decision but he was removed from his position as city physician.

In 1882, Schuppert called for a return to bloodletting, a controversial medical technique. In 1883, he read a paper entitled "Anti-Vaccination" at a meeting of the Louisiana State Medical Society. However, the Society was not convinced and affirmed its confidence in vaccination "as the surest and only practical means of preventing the spread of small-pox."

He authored valuable papers for The New Orleans Medical and Surgical Journal.

Schuppert died on May 2, 1887.

== Selected publications ==
- Treatise on Gun-Shot Wounds (1861)
- A Treatise on Vesico-Vaginal Fistula (1866)
