= Johann Brandl =

Austrian composer and conductor (1835–1913)

Johann Brandl (30 October 1835 – 9 June 1913) was an Austrian composer and conductor of theatre orchestras, for many years conductor at the Carltheater in Vienna.

== Life ==
Brandl was born in 1835 in Kirchenbirk in Bohemia (now Kostelní Bříza in the Czech Republic), son of a tobacconist and master carpenter. He came to Vienna in 1853, where he studied with Jakob Dont and took a bandmaster course with Andreas Leonhardt. From 1855 to 1865, he conducted theatre orchestras in Baden bei Wien, Ödenburg (now Sopron) and Pressburg (now Bratislava).

In Vienna he became conductor in 1865 at the Theater in der Josefstadt. From 1866 to the 1880s, he was at the Carltheater, conducting operettas including premieres of works by Franz von Suppé, Johann Strauss II and others. He was afterwards the conductor of Nathaniel Meyer von Rothschild's chamber orchestra. He was also a singing teacher; among his students was the opera singer Antonie Schläger. He died in Vienna in 1913.

== Works ==
Brandl composed several operettas, interludes for operettas by other composers, incidental music for many plays, and dance music.
