= André Hoelz =

Structural cell biologist

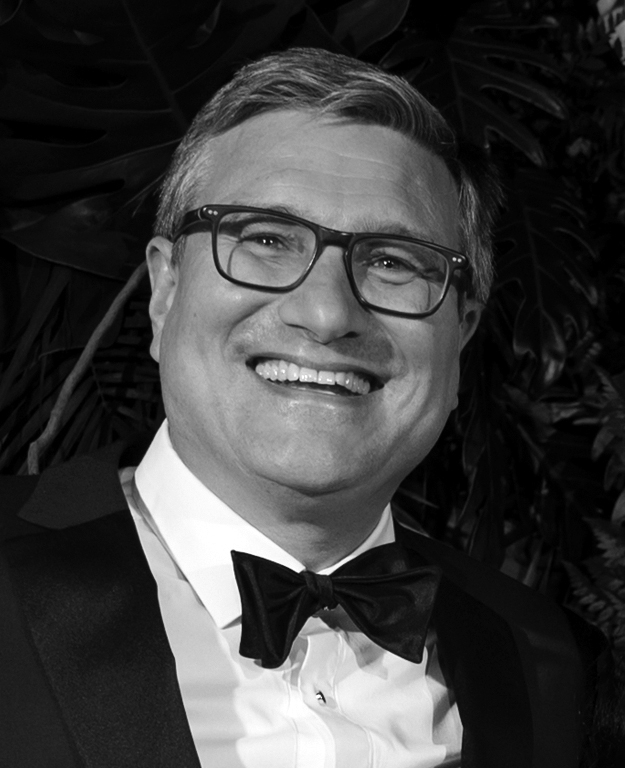
- Citizenship: German
- Education: University of Freiburg (Vordiplom, Diplom); The Rockefeller University (Ph.D.)
- Scientific career
- Fields: Chemistry; Biochemistry; Structural Biology; Cell Biology
- Workplaces: Rockefeller University
- Academic advisors: Karl Decker; John Kuriyan; Günter Blobel

André Hoelz is a German-American structural cell biologist. He is the Mary and Charles Ferkel Professor of Chemistry and Biochemistry at California Institute of Technology (Caltech) and an investigator of the Howard Hughes Medical Institute. He is best known for his research on the structure and function of the nuclear pore complex and its role in nucleocytoplasmic transport. He is a member of the Scientific Advisory Board of the Advanced Photon Source of the Argonne National Laboratory.

== Early life and education ==
André Hoelz completed his undergraduate education at Albert-Ludwig University in Freiburg, Germany, receiving his Vordiplom in chemistry in 1993 and his Diplom in chemistry and biochemistry in 1997. He then pursued graduate studies at Rockefeller University, working with John Kuriyan on the regulation of protein kinases, and earned his Ph.D. in biochemistry and structural biology in 2004. He remained at Rockefeller to establish a structural biology group in Günter Blobel's laboratory, where he initiated the comprehensive structural and functional characterization of the nuclear pore complex. In 2010, he moved to California Institute of Technology, where he has been since.

== Research ==
Hoelz's research focuses on the structural cell biology of nucleocytoplasmic transport, with a particular emphasis on the structural characterization of the nuclear pore complex, a large channel embedded in the nuclear envelope that mediates the regulated bi-directional exchange of macromolecules between the nucleus and cytoplasm. His laboratory has made contributions to understanding the nuclear pore complex's structural architecture and its role in regulating molecular transport. Over the course of two decades, Hoelz has used techniques such as in elaborate biochemical reconstitution, X-ray crystallography and cryo-electron microscopy to uncover the molecular details of the nuclear pore complex, with implications for diseases linked to defects in nuclear transport, including cancer and neurodegenerative disorders. In 2016, Hoelz published the near-atomic composite structure of the human NPC's symmetric core. In 2022, Hoelz published the composite structure of ~95% of the structured mass of the human nuclear pore complex, including the elucidation of the linker scaffold, an elaborate system that mediates the cohesion of the ~1,000 nucleoporins that make up a nuclear pore complex and simultaneously allows for the reversible constriction and dilation of its central transport channel. Back-to-back, Hoelz published the composite structure of the cytoplasmic face of the human nuclear pore complex that mediates key biochemical processes underlying the export of messenger RNA from the nucleus. His lab is also known for its research on mRNA export, specifically how messenger RNA is transported from the nucleus to the cytoplasm, a crucial step in gene expression and the central dogma. In total, the Hoelz laboratory contributed ~100 different atomic structure of nucleoporins and nucleoporin complexes. Hoelz contributed two review articles on the structure of the nuclear pore complex, published in 2011 and 2019, which have been collectively cited ~1,000 times.

== Grants and funding ==
Hoelz's research has been supported by several major grants, including funding from the Howard Hughes Medical Institute and the National Institutes of Health.

== Selected publications ==
Hoelz has authored numerous papers on topics related to structural cell biology of nucleocytoplasmic transport. Additionally, he has contributed to the mechanistic understanding of protein kinases, acetyl transferases, deacetylases, demethylases, and oxidases.

== Awards ==
Hoelz was a faculty scholar of the Howard Hughes Medical Institute from 2016 to 2021, and an investigator at the Heritage Medical Research Institute at Caltech from 2015 to 2021. He has received numerous scientific awards, including the Camille Dreyfus Teacher-Scholar Award of the Camille & Henry Dreyfus Foundation in 2015, the Kimmel Scholar Award from the Sidney Kimmel Foundation for Cancer Research in 2012, the 54th Mallinckrodt Scholar Award of the Edward Mallinckrodt, Jr. Foundation in 2011, the Albert Wyrick V Scholar Award from The V Foundation for Cancer Research in 2010, the Burroughs Wellcome Fund Pre-Doctoral Fellowship in the Interfaces of Science Program in 1999, and the Prize of the "Fonds der Chemischen Industrie" for academic excellence in 1991. The structural work on the nuclear pore complex was referred to as a "Biological Structure of the Year" in 2016 by Chemical & Engineering News, and research highlights were published by the Advanced Photon Source at the Argonne National Laboratory in 2016 and 2022, Stanford Synchrotron Radiation Lightsource in 2016 and 2022, and National Synchrotron Light Source II at the Brookhaven National Laboratory in 2018.

== Personal life ==
André Hoelz was born in Lüdenscheid, North Rhine-Westphalia, Germany, and grew up in Schwäbisch Hall, a town known for its medieval architecture and rich cultural history. After completing his studies in chemistry and biochemistry at the University of Freiburg, he moved to the United States in 1997 to pursue graduate studies at Rockefeller University in New York.

In 2015, Hoelz was diagnosed with a tumor in the inner auditory canal (IAC), initially identified as an acoustic neuroma due to its location, after experiencing sudden vertigo and hearing loss following a transcontinental flight. Initially managed with a watch-and-wait approach, his condition worsened in 2018, leading to urgent surgery to address severe symptoms, including facial nerve dysfunction, facial asymmetry, and near-total hearing loss in one ear. Hoelz underwent surgery at the University of California, San Diego Acoustic Neuroma Center and Jacobs Medical Center, where, according to his description, the exceptional expertise of his surgical team preserved his facial nerve function despite revealing that the tumor was an exceptionally rare meningioma in the inner auditory canal (IAC)—with only a handful of newly diagnosed cases per year worldwide—rather than an acoustic neuroma. Although his facial nerve function was saved, hearing in his tumor-affected ear could not be preserved, leaving him with single-sided deafness (SSD). His non-tumor ear is also significantly hearing impaired due to a childhood middle ear infection, and as a result he now lives with substantially reduced overall hearing capacity.

Since 2018, Hoelz has been a member of the Acoustic Neuroma Association and a dedicated contact for newly diagnosed acoustic neuroma patients, openly sharing his medical journey to offer hope and a compassionate, firsthand perspective on recovery. Following his surgery, Hoelz began a collaboration with neurotologist Rick Friedman, who, together with Marc Schwartz, removed his tumor. They have been working on the basic biology of the protective pathway that shields hair cells from noise and drug-induced hearing loss, funded by grants from the National Institute on Deafness and Other Communication Disorders (NIDCD) and the Curebound Foundation.
