= Březová (Sokolov District) =

- Town
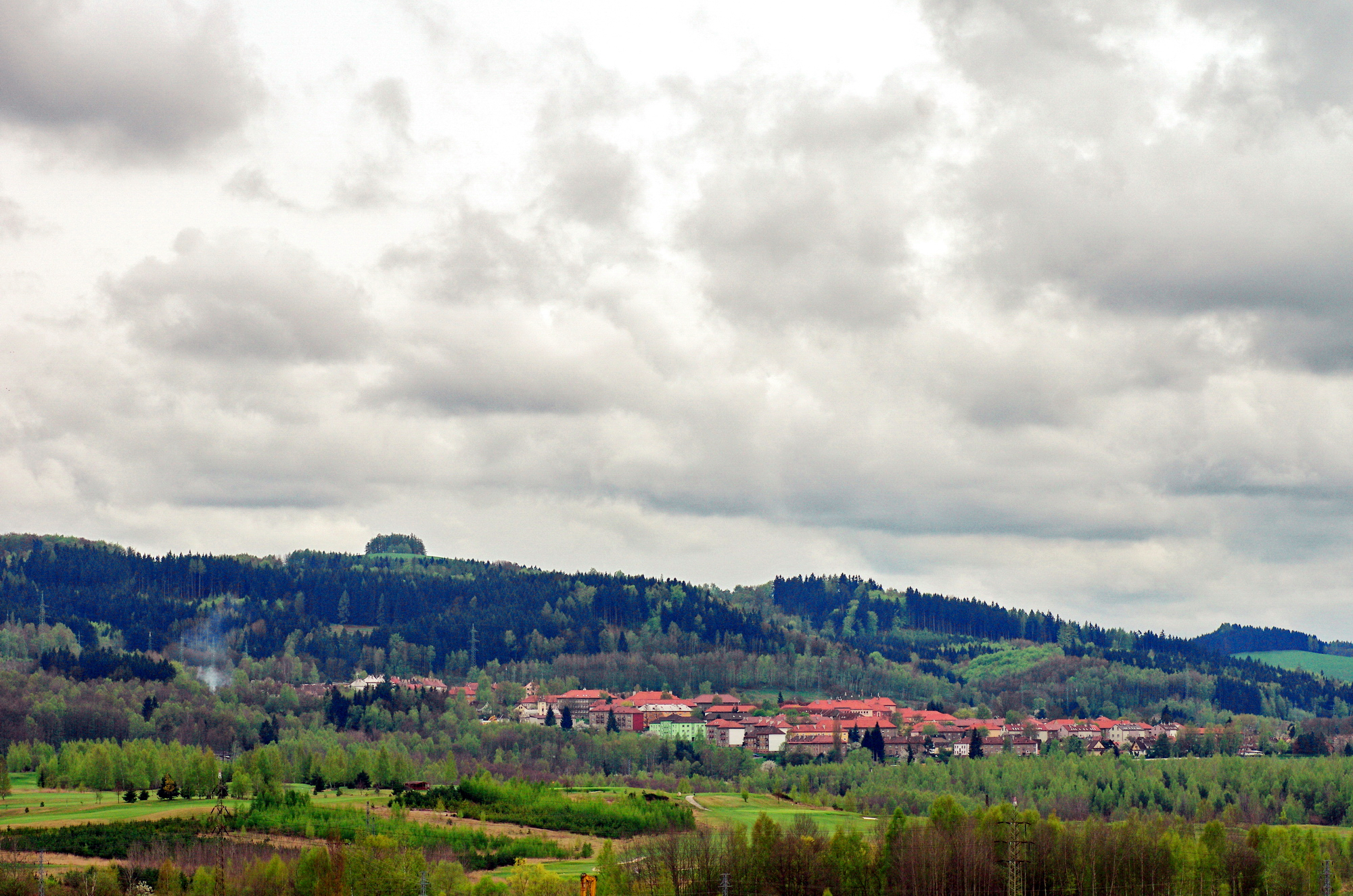
- View from the north

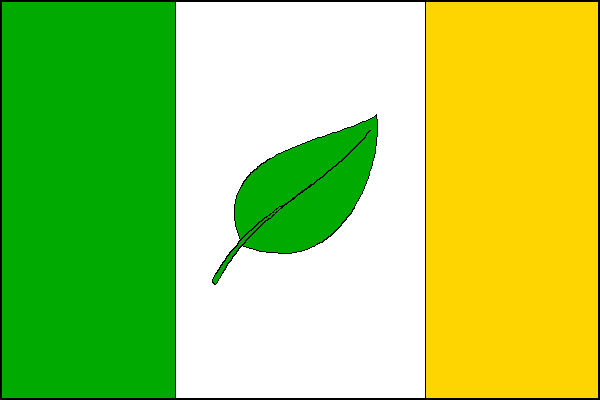
- Flag Coat of arms

- Location in the Czech Republic
- Coordinates: 50°8′46″N 12°38′52″E
- Country: Czech Republic
- Region: Karlovy Vary
- District: Sokolov
- First mentioned: 1353

Government
  - Mayor: Jaroslav Bělíček

Area
  - Total: 59.59 km^{2} (23.01 sq mi)
- Elevation: 487 m (1,598 ft)

Population (2026-01-01)
  - Total: 2,640
  - Density: 44.3/km^{2} (115/sq mi)
- Time zone: UTC+1 (CET)
  - Summer (DST): UTC+2 (CEST)
- Postal codes: 356 01, 358 03
- Website: www.mu-brezova.cz

Březová (Czech pronunciation: [ˈbr̝ɛzovaː]; German: Prösau) is a town in Sokolov District in the Karlovy Vary Region of the Czech Republic. It has about 2,600 inhabitants. The town is located on the border between the Slavkov Forest and Sokolov Basin.

== Administrative division ==
Březová consists of seven municipal parts (in brackets population according to the 2021 census):

- Březová (2,240)
- Arnoltov (33)
- Kamenice (75)
- Kostelní Bříza (52)
- Lobzy (6)
- Rudolec (135)
- Tisová (36)

== Etymology ==
The name is derived from the Czech word bříza, i.e. 'birch'.

== Geography ==
Březová is located about 3 kilometres (2 mi) south of Sokolov and 17 km (11 mi) southwest of Karlovy Vary. It lies mostly in the Slavkov Forest range, only the northern part of the municipal territory with half of the town proper lies in the Sokolov Basin. The highest point is near the top of the Lazský vrch hill at 847 m (2,779 ft) above sea level. The Tisová Stream originates here and then flows through the town proper. North of the town is Lake Silvestr, created by reclaiming a mine dump.

== History ==
The first written mention of Březová is from 1353. The most significant owners of the settlement were the Nostitz family, who acquired it in the first half of the 17th century. Part of the population was ethnic German, but most of them were expelled after World War II.

From 1939 to 1979, lignite was mined next to the town. In 1954, the municipalities of Kamenice and Lobzy and the area of the extinct village of Paseka were annexed to Březová. In 1960, Tisová was annexed to Březová and the municipality obtained the title of a town. In 1976, Kostelní Bříza (including its parts of Arnoltov and Rudolec) were annexed to the town.

== Demographics ==
Historical population

Year	Pop.	±%
1869	4,986	—
1880	4,966	−0.4%
1890	4,720	−5.0%
1900	4,688	−0.7%
1910	4,876	+4.0%

Year	Pop.	±%
1921	4,864	−0.2%
1930	5,119	+5.2%
1950	1,292	−74.8%
1961	3,575	+176.7%
1970	3,307	−7.5%

Year	Pop.	±%
1980	3,096	−6.4%
1991	2,717	−12.2%
2001	2,781	+2.4%
2011	2,625	−5.6%
2021	2,577	−1.8%

Source: Censuses

== Transport ==
The D6 motorway (the section from Karlovy Vary to Cheb and the Czech–German border, here part of the European routes E48 and E49) runs north of the town.

== Sights ==
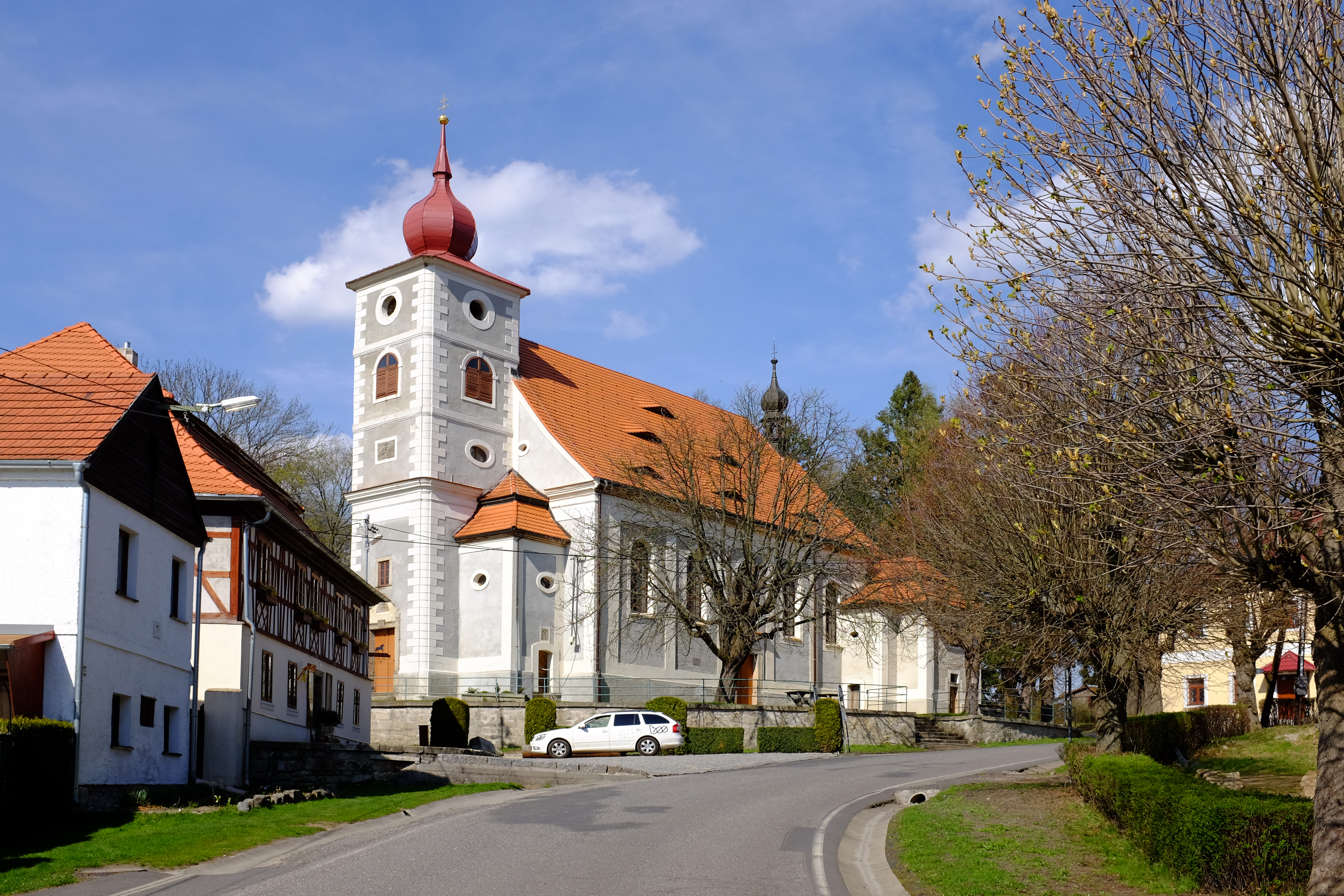
Church of Saints Peter and Paul

The most important monument is the Church of Saints Peter and Paul, located in Kostelní Bříza. It was built in the late Baroque style in 1802 on the site of an older church.

In Kostelní Bříza is a Baroque castle, rebuilt to its present form in 1767. Today it is dilapidated and unused. Next to the castle is a dendrologically significant park.

A valuable building, also located in Kostelní Bříza, is a manor house from the second half of the 18th century. It is one of the best-preserved half-timbered buildings in the region.

== Notable people ==
- Johann Brandl (1835–1913), Austrian composer and conductor
