= Barbette Mountain =

Mountain in the country of Canada

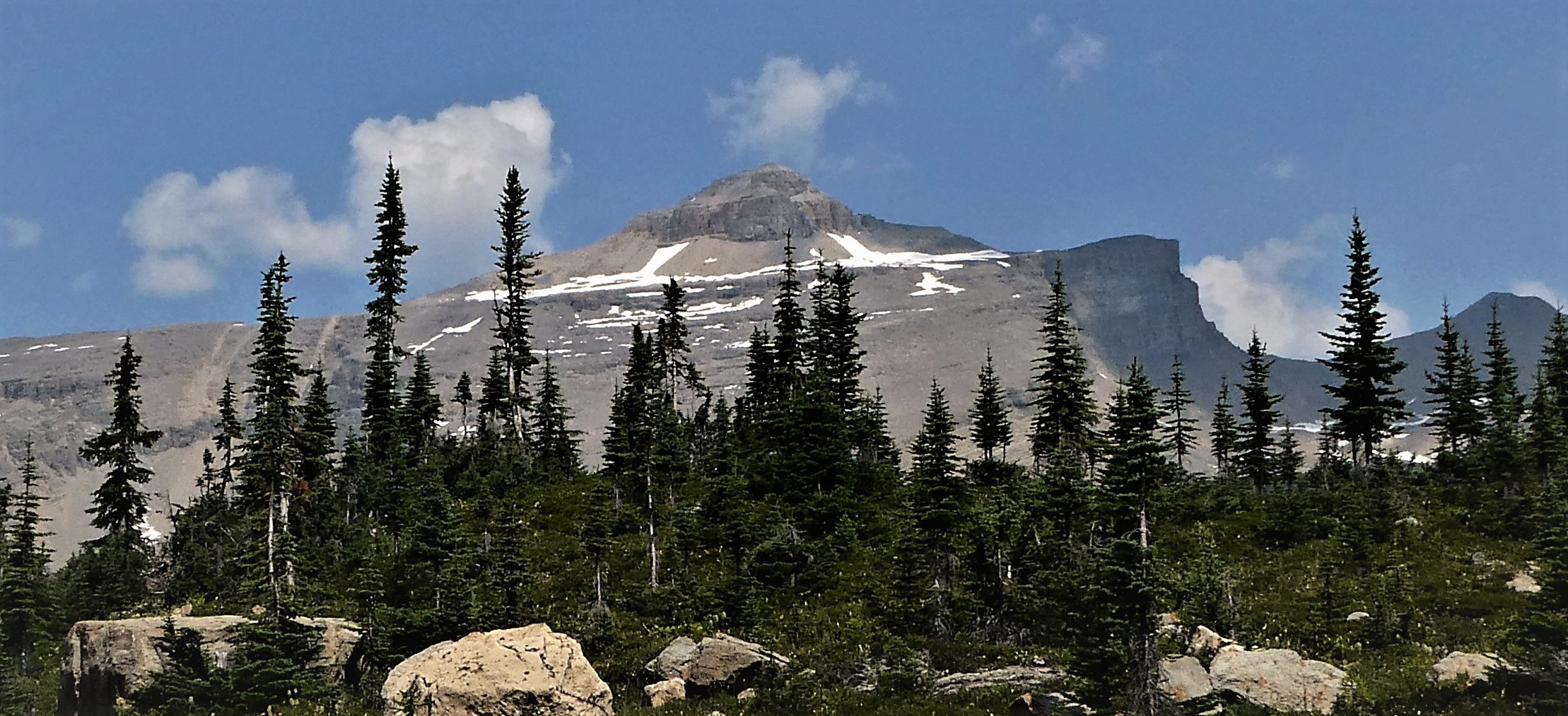
- South aspect

Highest point
- Elevation: 3,072 m (10,079 ft)
- Prominence: 338 m (1,109 ft)
- Parent peak: Mistaya Mountain (3,078 m)
- Isolation: 2.2 km (1.4 mi)
- Listing: Mountains of Alberta; Mountains of British Columbia
- Coordinates: 51°43′29″N 116°37′05″W

Naming
- Etymology: Barbette

Geography
- Location within Alberta Location within British Columbia Location within Canada
- Country: Canada
- Provinces: Alberta and British Columbia
- Protected area: Banff National Park
- Parent range: Waputik Mountains; Canadian Rockies
- Topo map: NTS 82N10 Blaeberry River

Geology
- Rock age: Cambrian
- Rock type: Sedimentary rock

Climbing
- First ascent: 1933

Barbette Mountain is 3,072-metre (10,079-foot) summit located on the shared border of Alberta and British Columbia, Canada.

== Description ==
Barbette Mountain is situated on the Continental Divide and on the boundary of Banff National Park. It is part of the Waputik Mountains which is a subrange of the Canadian Rockies. The nearest higher neighbor is Mistaya Mountain, 2.2 km (1.4 mi) to the southeast. Precipitation runoff from Barbette drains west to the Blaeberry River via Wildcat Creek, and east into tributaries of the Mistaya River. Topographic relief is significant as the summit rises 1,750 meters (5,740 ft) above the Blaeberry Valley in 6 km (3.7 mi). The peak is visible from the Icefields Parkway in the vicinity of the Silverhorn Creek Bridge.

== History ==
Barbette Mountain was named in 1918 by interprovincial boundary surveyors and the toponym was officially adopted March 31, 1924, by the Geographical Names Board of Canada. The descriptive name was inspired by the two high platform peaks which rise from the mass of the mountain. A barbette (French for platform) is a platform in a fort or ship upon which guns are mounted.

The first ascent of the summit was made in 1933 by Henry S. Kingman and J. Monroe Thorington, with guide Conrad Kain.

== Geology ==
Barbette Mountain is composed of sedimentary rock laid down during the Precambrian to Jurassic periods. Formed in shallow seas, this sedimentary rock was pushed east and over the top of younger rock during the Laramide orogeny.

== Climate ==
Based on the Köppen climate classification, Barbette Mountain is located in a subarctic climate zone with cold, snowy winters, and mild summers. Winter temperatures can drop below −20 °C (−4 °F) with wind chill factors below −30 °C (−22 °F). This climate supports the Barbette and Delta glaciers on the north and east slopes of the peak.

== See also ==
- List of peaks on the Alberta–British Columbia border
- List of mountains in the Canadian Rockies
