= Marburg University =

Public university in Hesse, Germany

- Philipps-Universität Marburg
- Latin: Schola Marpurgensis
- Type: Public
- Established: 1 July 1527; 499 years ago
- Affiliations: Compostela Group of Universities
- Budget: €455.1 million (2023)
- Chancellor: Claas Cordes
- President: Thomas Nauss
- Academic staff: 2,032 (2023)
- Administrative staff: 1,917 (2023)
- Students: 21,162 (2024/25)
- Location: Marburg, Hesse, Germany; 50°48′39″N 8°46′25″E
- Campus: University town
- Website: uni-marburg.de

- Location within Germany Location within Hesse

Marburg University (German: Philipps-Universität Marburg) is a public research university located in Marburg, Germany. It was founded in 1527 by Philip I, Landgrave of Hesse, which makes it one of Germany's oldest universities and the oldest still operating Protestant university in the world. It is now a public university of the state of Hesse, without religious affiliation.

Marburg University has 21,162 students (2024/25) and is located in Marburg. It offers an International summer university programme and offers student exchanges through the Erasmus programme.

== History ==
=== Founding years ===
On 1 July 1527, the landgravial chancellor Johann Feige formally inaugurated the university, which had been founded by Landgrave Philip I by decree on 30 May. At that time, it had eleven professors and 88 students. The first rector was Johannes Eisermann, known as Ferrarius Montanus, a professor of law and assessor at the landgravial court in Amöneburg. The same year, he granted the university the necessary academic freedoms. On 4 October 1541, the university gained financial independence through the deed of endowment. The following year, the Landgrave received the university privilege from Emperor Charles V during the Imperial Diet in Regensburg.

The university initially used the former monastic buildings of the Dominicans, Franciscans, and Brethren of the Common Life. Landgrave Philip granted it privileges such as the right to send a representative to the regional assembly and exemptions from tolls and levies for university members.

In 1529, the landgrave hosted the Marburg Colloquy, a religious debate between Martin Luther, Ulrich Zwingli, and Philip Melanchthon. The reputation of its theological faculty attracted international students, especially from Switzerland, Denmark, Sweden, the Netherlands, and Scotland. Among them were Patrick Hamilton, who studied briefly at Marburg. Outbreaks of disease (such as English sweating sickness and the plague) repeatedly forced the university to relocate temporarily to nearby towns during its first century.

=== 16th and 17th century ===
Until his death in 1560, Johann Friedrich Dryander held the chair of medicine at Marburg University. On 15 November 1565, Landgrave William IV of Hesse-Kassel appointed Georg Marius as professor, without the university's formal consent. A second medical chair was added in 1566, filled by Victorinus Schönfeldt, who was already serving as professor of mathematics.

Between 1580 and 1628, Rudolph Goclenius was professor of philosophy, logic, and ethics at Marburg University.

When Landgrave Maurice of Hesse-Kassel, who had inherited the Landgraviate of Hesse-Marburg in 1604, converted to Calvinism the following year, the university was compelled to adopt the reformed confession as well (which it maintained until the end of its confessional alignment in 1866). This shift drove many Lutheran professors to the newly founded University of Giessen in 1607. In 1625, when Marburg temporarily came under Lutheran Hesse-Darmstadt, the University of Giessen returned to Marburg University and was later closed. On 24 June 1653, the university was reopened by William VI of Hesse-Kassel, who moved the state's university back from Kassel to Marburg, thereby closing the University of Kassel. In the years that followed, the university faced difficult times due to ongoing confessionalization and financial hardship.

=== 18th century ===
In 1723, philosopher Christian Wolff was appointed to a chair at Marburg University after being expelled from Halle by Frederick William I. Despite opposition from parts of the theological faculty, Wolff taught in Marburg until 1740 under the protection of the Landgrave, before being recalled to Prussia by Frederick the Great. The Seven Years' War later disrupted the university, as Hesse became a battleground and Marburg was fortified.

By 1785, the university held special legal and political status: it had its own jurisdiction, ecclesiastical endowments, and a seat in the regional assembly. The Landgrave acted as rector, the finance minister as curator, and the senate consisted of representatives from theology, law, medicine, and philosophy, along with language and technical instructors.

=== 19th century ===
Marburg University experienced renewed growth during the Napoleonic era. In 1807, the Electorate of Hesse became part of the newly formed Kingdom of Westphalia, a French satellite state. Although several universities within the new kingdom were closed, Marburg was spared and benefited financially from the redistribution of resources, particularly following the closure of the universities in Rinteln and Helmstedt. The university library expanded significantly through transfers from Rinteln.

In 1810, Westphalian authorities banned students from wearing regional colours and uniforms, triggering a prolonged conflict between students and the administration. In May 1811, around 200 students protested by marching to Gladenbach, leading to the release of an imprisoned student and an official inquiry.

After the return of the prince-elector in 1813, many reforms were reversed, including the dissolution of Westphalian administrative structures and centralised funding. Influenced by the Wars of Liberation, student movements promoting national unity and liberal ideas gained traction in Marburg. In 1816, the student society Teutonia merged with local student associations to form Germania Marburgensis, though its development was hindered by the Carlsbad Decrees until the 1850s. Under prince-elector Wilhelm I, religious restrictions were eased, allowing the appointment of Catholic professors alongside Lutherans. Wilhelm II later granted full confessional equality, which contributed to rising enrolment. During the 1820s and following decades, the university expanded its facilities, including a new botanical garden, library, chemical laboratory, anatomical theatre, observatory, and clinics. The women's clinic, begun under Hessian rule, was completed in 1867.

Following the annexation of Hesse by Prussia in 1866, the university transitioned from a regional institution to part of the Prussian education system, benefiting from its reforms. At the time, it had 264 students (22 from outside Hesse) and 51 professors.

Due to property constraints and a preference for using existing state-owned buildings, the university remained decentralised across the city rather than adopting a unified campus model. Student numbers rose steadily, reaching 500 in 1880 and surpassing 1,000 by 1887.

=== 20th century ===
By 1909, student enrolment at Marburg University had doubled. Although women were not yet formally admitted, Tadako Urata received a doctoral degree in medicine in 1905 under a special provision. The first academic honour awarded to a woman at the university had been granted in 1827 to Daniel Jeanne Wyttenbach, who received an honorary doctorate for her philosophical writings on aesthetics. Formal admission of women began in the winter semester of 1908/09 with 26 female students; their number rose to 206 by the outbreak of World War I.

The war marked a major disruption. While 2,258 male students were enrolled in summer 1914, the number dropped to 1,899 in the following semester, with only 478 attending lectures. Within three months of war, the university had lost 55 students.

=== Nazi period ===
In 1926, a chapter of the National Socialist German Students' League (NSDStB) was established in Marburg. By 1931, it held a majority in the student council and led it from then on. After the Nazi rise to power in 1933, 21 professors—more than a tenth of the teaching staff—were dismissed for political or racial reasons under civil service laws. Among them were notable scholars such as economist Wilhelm Röpke, Romance philologist Erich Auerbach, and philosopher Karl Löwith. Professor Hermann Jacobsohn, a linguist, took his own life in April 1933 following his suspension. New racial and gender quotas were imposed on students, limiting Jewish enrollment to 1.5% overall and 5% for first-year students. The proportion of female students was temporarily capped at 10%.

=== After 1945 ===
Following 1945, the university saw rapid growth in student numbers. To accommodate demand, expansion efforts began in the 1960s, including new administrative, dining, and lecture buildings, and the relocation of the Faculty of Philosophy. A Faculty of Natural Sciences was founded on the newly developed Lahnberge campus, whose buildings were among the first in Germany to follow a prefabricated construction model known as the Marburg System.

=== 21st century ===
A nationally unprecedented event occurred on 1 January 2006, when the university hospital was privatised and sold to Rhön-Klinikum AG, a private healthcare company, following its merger with the University Hospital of Gießen.

In 2012 the university opened the first German interactive chemistry museum, called Chemicum. Its experimental course programme is aimed at encouraging young people to pursue careers in science.

In December 2023, the ceiling of a lecture hall in the Faculty of Law building collapsed.

== Structure ==
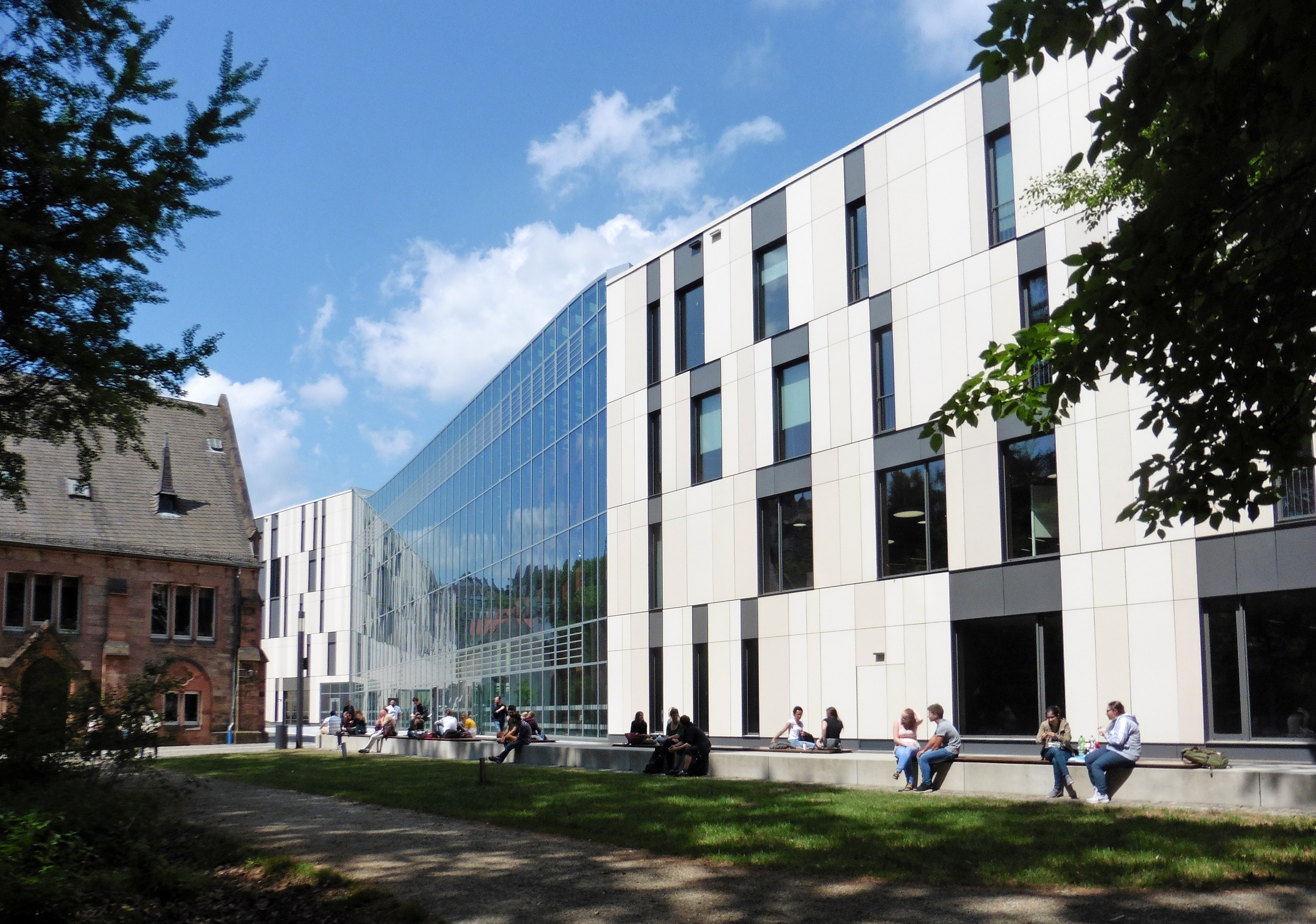
University library

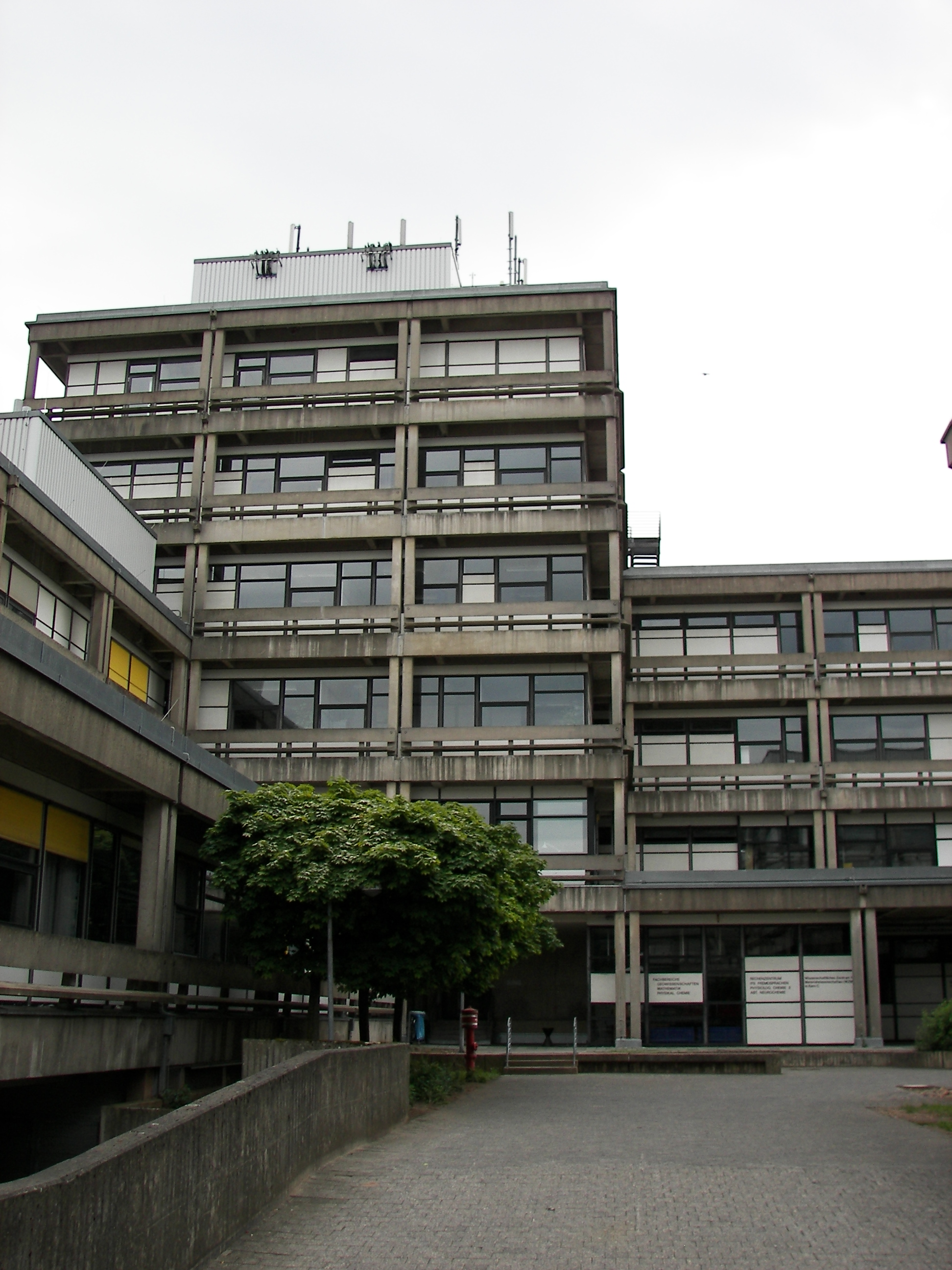
The Lahnberge Campus is dedicated to the natural sciences. The image shows the Multiple Purpose Building, home of the Departments of Mathematics and Computer Science, as well as laboratories for research into material sciences and physical chemistry

=== Departments ===
Marburg University is divided into 16 departments. In its early days, the university consisted of the Faculty of Theology, the Faculty of Medicine, the Faculty of Law, and the Faculty of Philosophy, from which the Faculty of Mathematics and Natural Sciences was separated in 1964. In 1970, under the Hessian Higher Education Act, these faculties were restructured into 20 departments. Following mergers after 1997, the present organisation comprises 16 departments, whose numbering is no longer consecutive.

As part of the Bologna Process, the University introduced a large number of new Bachelor's and Master's degree programmes. At the same time, the traditional degree programmes with Magister, Diplom and similar qualifications were discontinued.

=== Associated institutes and museums ===
The university cooperates with the following affiliated institutes:

- Christoph Dornier Foundation for Clinical Psychology
- Research Centre for Personal Writings
- Hans von Soden Institute for Theological Research
- Health Care Management e.V.
- Institute for Cooperative Studies (a private legal foundation)
- Institute for Behavioural Therapy and Behavioural Medicine (IVV)
- Institute for Business and Social Ethics
- Catholic-Theological Seminary of the Faculty of Theology in Fulda

The following museums are affiliated with the university:

- Mineralogical Museum of Philipps University Marburg
- Museum of Art and Cultural History

=== Collections of the university (selection) ===
- Alter Botanischer Garten Marburg, the university's old botanical garden
- Botanischer Garten Marburg, the university's current botanical garden
- Forschungsinstitut Lichtbildarchiv älterer Originalurkunden bis 1250 (Collection of photographs taken from medieval charters)
- Bildarchiv Foto Marburg (German national picture archive of arts)
- Religionskundliche Sammlung (Collection of religious objects)
- Deutscher Sprachatlas (Linguistic Atlas of Germany)
- Mineralogisches Museum (Museum of Mineralogy)
- Museum für Kunst und Kulturgeschichte (Museum of Arts)
- Museum Anatomicum (Museum of Anatomy and Medical History, currently closed)
- University Archive https://www.uni-marburg.de/de/uniarchiv

== Research ==
=== Rankings ===
The departments of psychology and geography reached Excellence Group status in the Europe-wide CHE Excellence Ranking 2009.

University rankings

Overall – Global & National
QS World 2024	761–770	40–41
THE World 2024	401–500	37–41
ARWU World 2023	401–500	25–31

As per the QS World University Rankings of 2024, the institution is situated within the 761–770 range globally, and it holds the 40–41 position nationally. According to the THE World University Rankings of 2024, it ranks within the 401–500 bracket globally, while its national standing falls between 37 and 41. In the ARWU World Rankings of 2023, the university is listed in the 401–500 range worldwide, and it takes a national position between 25 and 31.

=== Collaborative Research Centres ===
The university is significant for its life-sciences research but is also home to one of the few centres that conduct research on the Middle East, the CNMS (Center for Near and Middle Eastern Studies).

The university's research is illustrated by its participation in several SFBs (Sonderforschungsbereiche). These collaborative research centres are financed by the German Science Foundation DFG. They encourage researchers to cross the boundaries of disciplines, institutes, departments and faculties within the participating university. The current SFB at Marburg University are:

- SFB 1083 – Structure and Dynamics of Internal Interfaces (started in 2013, in cooperation with Donostia International Physics Center San Sebastián)
- SFB/TRR 138 – Dynamics of Security: Forms of Securitisation in Historical Perspective (started in 2014)
- CRC/TRR 393 – Trajectories of Affective Disorders (since 2024)

=== Nobel Prize winners ===
Between 1901 and 2011, eleven individuals associated with Marburg University through study or teaching were awarded the Nobel Prize:

- 1901: Emil von Behring (Medicine)
- 1909: Ferdinand Braun (Physics)
- 1910: Albrecht Kossel (Medicine)
- 1930: Hans Fischer (Chemistry)
- 1936: Otto Loewi (Medicine)
- 1939: Adolf Butenandt (Chemistry)
- 1944: Otto Hahn (Chemistry)
- 1958: Boris Pasternak (Literature)
- 1963: Karl Ziegler (Chemistry)
- 1979: Georg Wittig (Chemistry)
- 2011: Jules Hoffmann (Medicine)

=== Leibniz Prize winners ===
The Gottfried Wilhelm Leibniz Prize was awarded to the following researchers affiliated with Marburg University:

- 1987: Rudolf K. Thauer – Biochemical Microbiology
- 1989: Manfred T. Reetz – Organic Chemistry
- 1991: Ernst O. Göbel – Solid-State Physics
- 1991: Rolf Müller – Biochemistry / Molecular Biology
- 1996: Reinhard Lührmann – Molecular Biology
- 1997: Paul Knochel – Organometallic Chemistry
- 1997: Stephan W. Koch – Theoretical Physics
- 2002: Bruno Eckhardt – Theoretical Physics
- 2003: Roland Lill – Cell Biology / Biochemistry
- 2006: Gyburg Radke (married Uhlmann) – Classical Philology and Philosophy
- 2011: Friederike Pannewick – Arabic Studies
- 2022: Stefanie Dehnen – Inorganic Chemistry
- 2024: Tobias Erb – Synthetic Microbiology

=== Ars legendi prize for excellent university teaching ===
The Ars legendi Prize for Excellent University Teaching, the highest German award in the field of higher education, presented by the Stifterverband für die Deutsche Wissenschaft and the German Rectors' Conference (HRK), was awarded to the following individuals teaching at Marburg University:

- 2010: Jürgen Schäfer (Faculty Prize for Medicine)
- 2015: Jürgen Handke (for "Digital Teaching and Learning")
- 2016: Ilka Agricola (Faculty Prize for Mathematics)
- 2017: Stefan Bösner (Faculty Prize for Medicine)
- 2018: Evelyn Korn (for "Constructive Alignment")
- 2024: Rolf Kreyer (for "Theory and practice of English linguistics combined")

=== Scientific institutions ===
Marburg University hosts several academic and research institutions:

- Marburg University Research Academy (MARA) supports early career researchers through interdisciplinary training, funding, and career development services.
- The German Documentation Centre for Art History (Bildarchiv Foto Marburg) is one of Europe's largest image archives for art and architecture, providing resources and services for museums, scholars, and publishers.
- The Democracy Centre Hesse coordinates efforts against right-wing extremism and offers a Master's programme in counselling within that context.
- The Research Centre Deutscher Sprachatlas documents and studies regional varieties of German and maintains an expansive archive of dialect materials from around 50,000 locations.
- The Centre for Gender Studies and Feminist Research, founded in 2001, promotes interdisciplinary work in gender studies and coordinates related academic programmes.
- The Botanical Garden, located on the Lahnberge campus, spans 20 hectares and includes extensive plant collections, research areas, and greenhouses; the Old Botanical Garden now serves as a public park.
- SYNMIKRO, the Centre for Synthetic Microbiology, advances research on engineering microbial functions, with applications in biotechnology and medicine, in collaboration with the Max Planck Society.

== Students ==
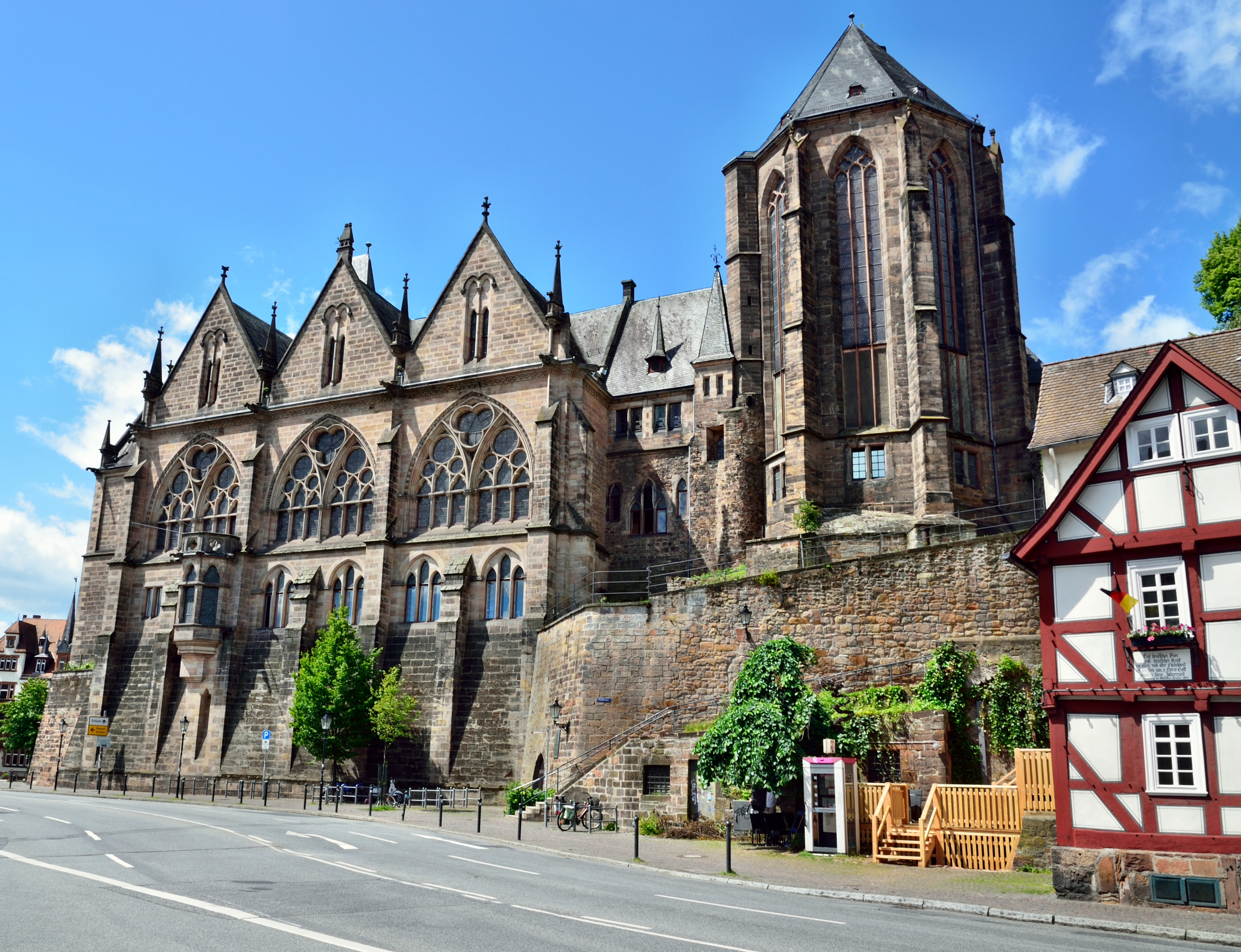
The Old University, housing the university church, the department for religious studies and a representative lecture hall

Students at Marburg University are represented by the General Student Committee (AStA) and the Student Parliament (StuPa), with additional representation at faculty level through student councils. The universal transit pass (semester ticket), negotiated by the AStA, allows students extensive access to public transport in Hesse and neighbouring areas, including use of selected InterCity (IC) and InterCity Express (ICE) trains.

The university offers various student residences, including the Christian-Wolff-Haus, the historical Collegium Philippinum, and the Vilmarhaus, run by the Protestant Church. The Konrad-Biesalski-Haus remains notable for its pioneering accessibility for students with physical disabilities.

== Notable alumni and faculty ==
=== Natural scientists ===
- Ludwig Aschoff
- Emil von Behring
- Karl Ferdinand Braun
- Klaus Bringmann
- Robert Bunsen
- Adolf Butenandt
- Georg Ludwig Carius
- Stefanie Dehnen
- Franz Ludwig Fick
- Hans Fischer
- Edward Frankland
- Frederick Augustus Genth
- Johann Peter Griess
- Juan Gundlach
- Karl Eugen Guthe
- Otto Hahn
- Johannes Hartmann
- Thomas Archer Hirst
- Erich Hückel
- Kathrin Jansen
- Manfred Klüppel
- Hermann Knoblauch
- Hermann Kolbe
- Albrecht Kossel
- Ulrich Lemmer
- Otto Loewi
- Carl Ludwig
- Hans Meerwein
- Ludwig Mond
- Denis Papin
- Heinrich Petraeus
- Otto Schindewolf
- Thorsten M. Schlaeger
- Alfred Walter Stewart
- Sunao Tawara
- John Tyndall
- Wilhelm Walcher
- Alfred Wegener
- Georg Wittig
- Alexandre Yersin
- Karl Ziegler
- Theodor Zincke
- Adolf Fick

=== Theologians ===
Marburg was always known as a humanities-focused university. It retained that strength, especially in Philosophy and Theology for a long time after World War II.

- Rudolf Bultmann
- Karl Barth
- Andreas Leonhard Creuzer
- Friedrich Heiler
- Wilhelm Herrmann
- Aegidius Hunnius
- Andreas Hyperius
- Otto Kaiser
- Helmut Koester
- Jacob Lorhard
- Rudolf Otto
- Johann Jakob Pfeiffer
- Kurt Rudolph
- Annemarie Schimmel
- Hans von Soden
- Paul Tillich
- August Friedrich Christian Vilmar
- Gottlieb Olpp – on medical missionary

=== Life scientists ===
The university has been known for its life sciences since 2022 at the latest. In the Times Higher Education World University Ranking 2022, it was ranked among the top 175 universities worldwide in the discipline of life sciences.

=== Philosophers ===
- Wolfgang Abendroth
- Hannah Arendt
- Karl Theodor Bayrhoffer
- Ernst Cassirer
- Hermann Cohen
- Hans-Georg Gadamer
- Nicolai Hartmann
- Martin Heidegger
- Hans Heinz Holz
- Hans Jonas
- Friedrich Albert Lange
- Karl Löwith
- Paul Natorp
- José Ortega y Gasset
- Isaac Rülf
- Henry Slonimsky
- Leo Strauss
- Christian Wolff
- Eduard Zeller
- Jochen Ropke

=== Other ===
- Annette Henninger
- Ingeborg Weber-Kellermann

=== Alumni ===
- Kunigunde Bachl
- John Baillie (theologian)
- Hermann Behrends (1907–1948), German Nazi SS officer executed for war crimes
- Gottfried Benn
- Gerold Bepler
- Jessie Forbes Cameron (1883–1968)
- Georg Friedrich Creuzer
- Rolf van Dick
- T. S. Eliot (who had to quit a summer school in August 1914, at the start of World War I)
- Johannes Goddaeus
- Jacob Grimm
- Wilhelm Grimm
- Caspar Friedrich Hachenberg
- Patrick Hamilton (martyr)
- Gustav Heinemann
- de:Jost Hermand
- Beatrice Heuser
- Stefan Hofmann
- Kim Hwang-sik
- Wilhelm Liebknecht
- Mikhail Lomonosov
- Carlyle Ferren MacIntyre
- Ulrike Meinhof
- Friedrich Paulus
- Boris Pasternak
- Ernst Reuter
- Ferdinand Sauerbruch
- Friedrich Carl von Savigny
- Heinrich Schütz
- Moritz Schuppert
- Manfred Siebald
- Wilhelm Röpke
- Costas Simitis
- Jack Thiessen
- Dmitry Ivanovich Vinogradov
- Richard Wiese (linguist)
- Wolfgang Wolff

== See also ==
- List of early modern universities in Europe
- List of universities in Germany
