= Gene gating =

Genetic phenomenon

Gene gating is a phenomenon by which transcriptionally active genes are brought next to nuclear pore complexes (NPCs) so that nascent transcripts can quickly form mature mRNA associated with export factors. Gene gating was first hypothesised by Günter Blobel in 1985. It has been shown to occur in Saccharomyces cerevisiae, Caenorhabditis elegans, Drosophila melanogaster as well as mammalian model systems.

The proteins that constitute the NPCs, known as nucleoporins, have been shown to play a role in DNA binding and mRNA transport, making gene gating possible. In addition, gene gating is orchestrated by two protein complexes, Spt-Ada-Gcn5-acetyltransferase (SAGA) and transcription–export complex 2 (TREX-2 complex). SAGA is a chromatin remodeling complex responsible for activating the transcription of certain inducible genes. The SAGA complex binds to gene promoters and also interacts with the TREX-2 complex. In turn, the TREX-2 complex interacts with the NPC, thus favouring the relocation of actively transcribed genes to the periphery of the cell nucleus. In contrast, the rest of the periphery, i.e. those parts not associated with NPCs, is transcriptionally silent heterochromatin.

== Mechanism ==
=== Nucleoporins and gene recruitment sequences ===
Nucleoporins (Nups) are the main constituent proteins of NPCs and have been shown to play multiple roles in mediating several processes involved in gene gating. While it has been known that the nuclear periphery serves as the primary location for most heterochromatin, telomeric and centrosomal DNA, studies in the yeast Saccharomyces cerevisiae have shown that NPCs containing Nup2p and Prp20p create boundaries of active gene expression near the nuclear envelope and prevent the spread of heterochromatin at the nuclear periphery. These Nup2p and Prp20p proteins also provide a location for the binding of chromatin.

Some inducible genes in yeast been shown to re-locate to the nuclear periphery by binding NPCs composed of specific Nups. Several of these inducible genes, including GAL1, INO1, TSA2, and HSP104 contain gene recruitment sequences (GRSs) found in the promoter, which are necessary for the attachment of the gene to the NPC by way of DNA binding to specific Nups. This initial relocation of genes containing GRSs requires the action of Snf1-p dependent Spt-Ada-Gcn5 acetyltransferase (SAGA), a chromatin remodeling complex, as well as several mRNA export proteins, for their transcriptional activation at the nuclear periphery.

In the fruit fly Drosophila melanogaster large stretches of chromatin are bound to Nups Nup153 and Megator. These genomic regions are often found on the male X chromosome, which exhibits high levels of transcriptional activity due to dosage compensation; these regions of chromatin are termed Nup-associated regions (NARs). Depletion of Nup153 causes a drastic decrease in expression of genes associated with NARs and decreased the affinity of these gene sequences with the nuclear periphery. Other Nups such as Nup50, Nup60 and Nup98 are associated with genes involved in development and the cell cycle.

In mammalian model systems activated genes to be transcribed are shuttled in a Nup-dependent manner, though some experiments in human cell lines show a reversal of movement, from the periphery of the nucleus to the nucleoplasmic center. mRNP (messenger ribonucleoprotein) leaving sites of transcription in the nuclear center follows the same path through the nucleus to the NPC, which suggests that mRNA/protein complexes can move through the nucleus by a directed means, through interchromatin channels. In mice and human cell lines a transmembrane Nup, Nup210, has been shown to be necessary for the proper transcription of several genes involved in neurogenesis and myogenesis. RNAi knockdown of Nup210 prevents myogenesis in mouse stem cells, but has no effect on nuclear transport, though it has been speculated that Nup210 or other NPC-associated factors could influence chromatin architecture to mediate routes for mRNP/mRNA to the nuclear membrane. Movement of transcriptionally active genes from the periphery of the nucleus to the nucleoplasmic region has also been observed in human cell lines. The human Mash1, GAFB and β-globin loci have all been observed moving away from the nuclear periphery when transcriptionally active. This seems to contradict the gene-gating hypothesis, but this process may still be mediated by Nup98, a soluble Nup protein that shuttles between the nucleoplasm and NPC at the nuclear membrane. Nup98 seems to be responsible for the transport of many RNAs from the center of the nucleus to the nuclear lamina. Nup98 antibodies introduced in the nucleus block the export of many RNAs. A large body of data exists which supports the role of nulceoporins, both anchored to NPCs and soluble, in the role of mediating the transport of mRNA and for the proper transcription of active genes, though numerous other protein factors influence these complex processes.

=== SAGA and TREX-2 complexes ===
Spt-Ada-Gcn5 acetyltransferase (SAGA) is a histone modifying transcriptional co-activator that is composed of 21 proteins and exhibits histone acetyltransferase (HAT) and deubiquitinating (DUB) activity. In yeast the SAGA complex serves to activate the transcription of approximately 10% of the genome, and this active gene/SAGA complex is then able to interact with the TREX-2 complex, a NPC-associated mRNA export complex. Numerous proteins involved in the formation of mRNA interact with the NPC, with the majority of these protein-protein interactions occurring between the SAGA complex and the TREX-2 complex at the NPC. Correct transcription and subsequent export of mRNA is largely dependent on this interaction. A common protein subunit of both the SAGA and TREX-2 complexes, Sus1, binds to the upstream activating sequence via SAGA, which then serves as the attachment point to the TREX-2 complex. The interacting surfaces between Sus1 and the TREX-2 complex are facilitated by the protein subunits Mex67 and Yra1 of the TREX-2 complex, as evidenced by co-immunoprecipitation experiments. The TREX-2 complex is bound to the NPC complex by the nucleoporin Nup1. All TREX-2 subunits are necessary for the successful formation and export of an mRNA transcript at the nuclear membrane for genes activated by the SAGA complex, and data suggest that SAGA and TREX-2 act in concert to recruit Sus1 to genes to be transcribed. Other investigations have shown that several SAGA subunits interact with the NPC protein Mlp1, providing another link between the NPC and the SAGA/active gene complex.

In multicellular eukaryotes, the precursor SAGA complex diverged into the (metazoan) SAGA complex and a separate ATAC complex which shares the same core subunits, but with 9-10 subunits distinct to the ATAC complex. In humans (but not insects) each of the SAGA and ATAC complex come in two variants depending on whether they contain GCN5 or PCAF.
