= Johannes Hartmann =

German chemist, physician and rector (1568–1631)

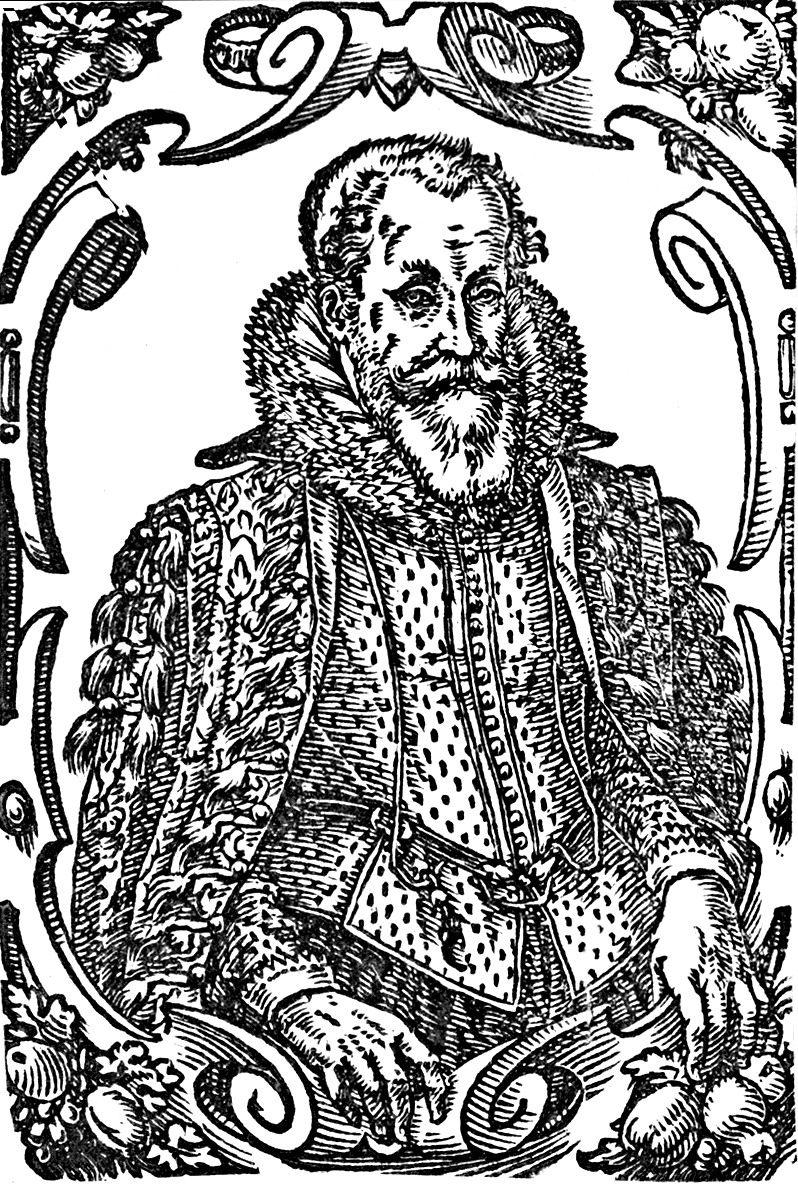
Johannes Hartmann

Johannes Hartmann (Amberg, 14 January 1568 – Kassel, 7 December 1631) was a German chemist.

In 1609, he became the first Professor of Chemistry at the University of Marburg. His teaching dealt mainly with pharmaceuticals. He was the father-in-law of Heinrich Petraeus.
