= Mistaya Mountain =

Mountain in the country of Canada

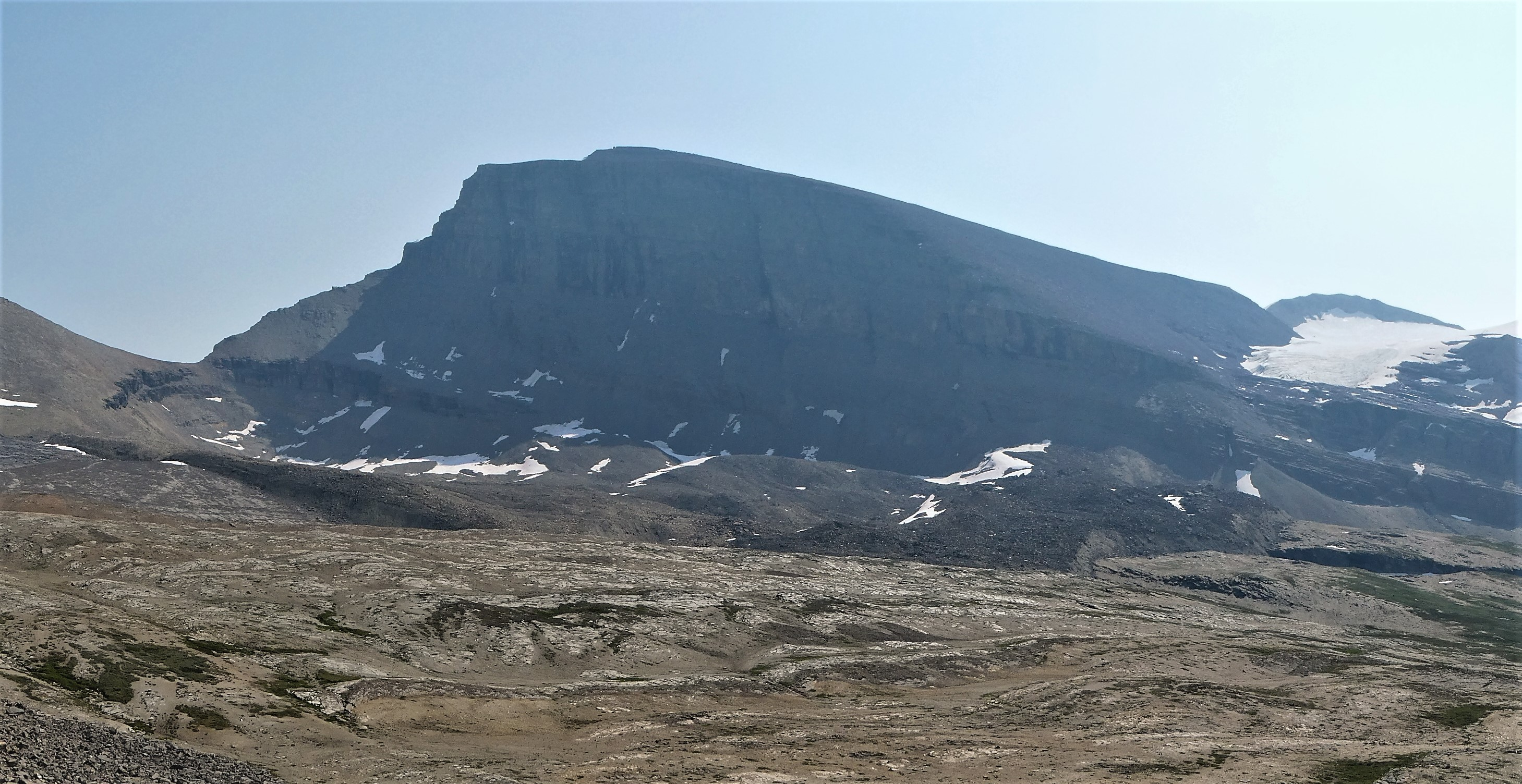
- Northwest aspect

Highest point
- Elevation: 3,078 m (10,098 ft)
- Prominence: 366 m (1,201 ft)
- Parent peak: Mount Baker (3180 m)
- Listing: Mountains of Alberta; Mountains of British Columbia
- Coordinates: 51°42′41″N 116°35′06″W

Geography
- Location within Alberta Location within British Columbia Location within Canada
- Interactive map of Mistaya Mountain
- Country: Canada
- Provinces: Alberta and British Columbia
- Protected area: Banff National Park
- Parent range: Waputik Mountains
- Topo map: NTS 82N10 Blaeberry River

Climbing
- First ascent: July 21, 1933 by H.S. Kingman, J. Monroe Thorington, Conrad Kain

Mistaya Mountain is located on the border of Alberta and British Columbia, on the Continental Divide. It was named in 1918. Mistaya is either the Cree name for "grizzly bear" or is the Stoney word for "much wind".

Mistaya is an easyish, non-technical mountain with good views, especially to the north, north-west and south.

== Geology ==
Mistaya Mountain is composed of sedimentary rock laid down during the Precambrian to Jurassic periods. Formed in shallow seas, this sedimentary rock was pushed east and over the top of younger rock during the Laramide orogeny.

== Climate ==
Based on the Köppen climate classification, Mistaya Mountain is located in a subarctic climate zone with cold, snowy winters, and mild summers. Temperatures can drop below −20 °C (−4 °F) with wind chill factors below −30 °C (−22 °F).

== Gallery ==
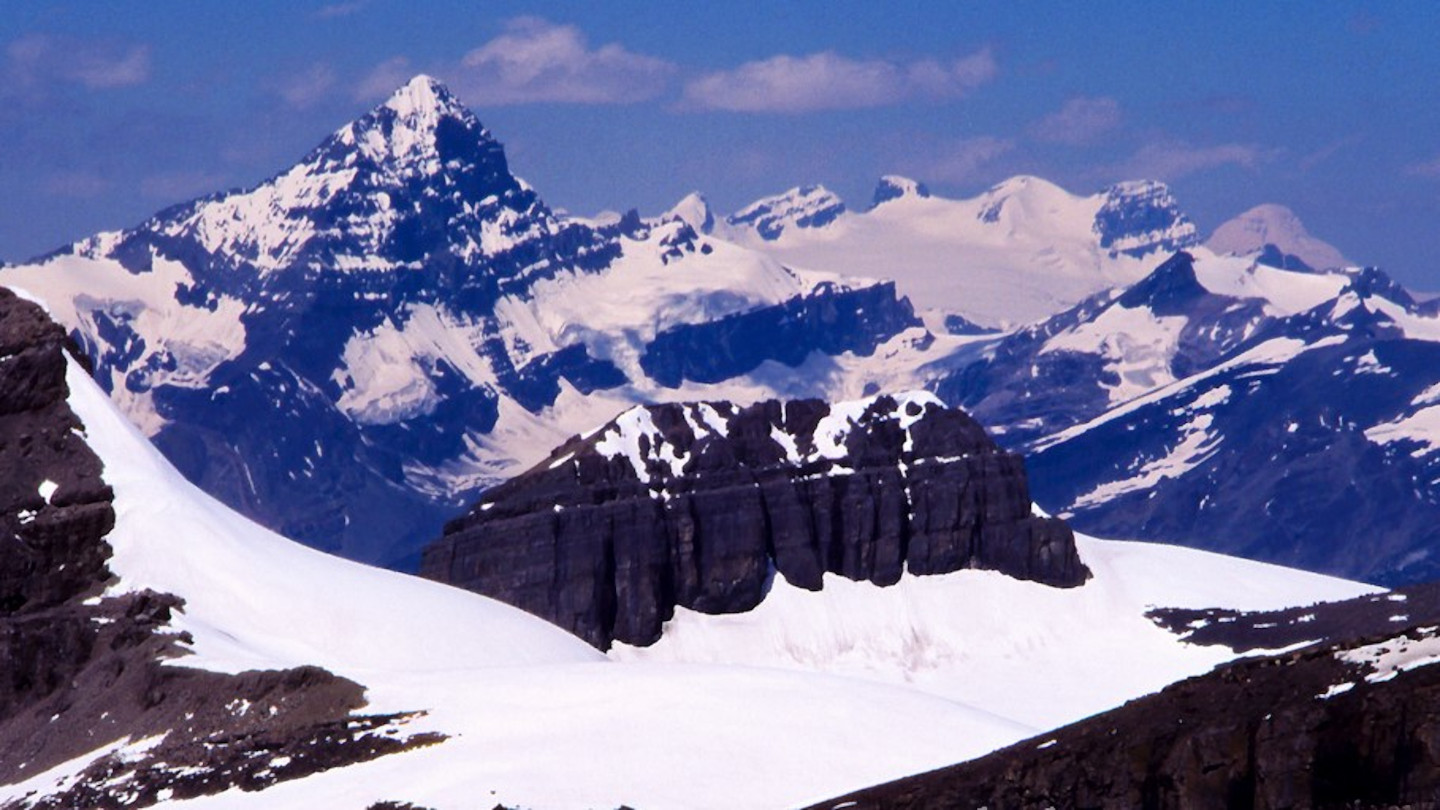
View from Mistaya: Mts. Forbes, Lyell & Columbia

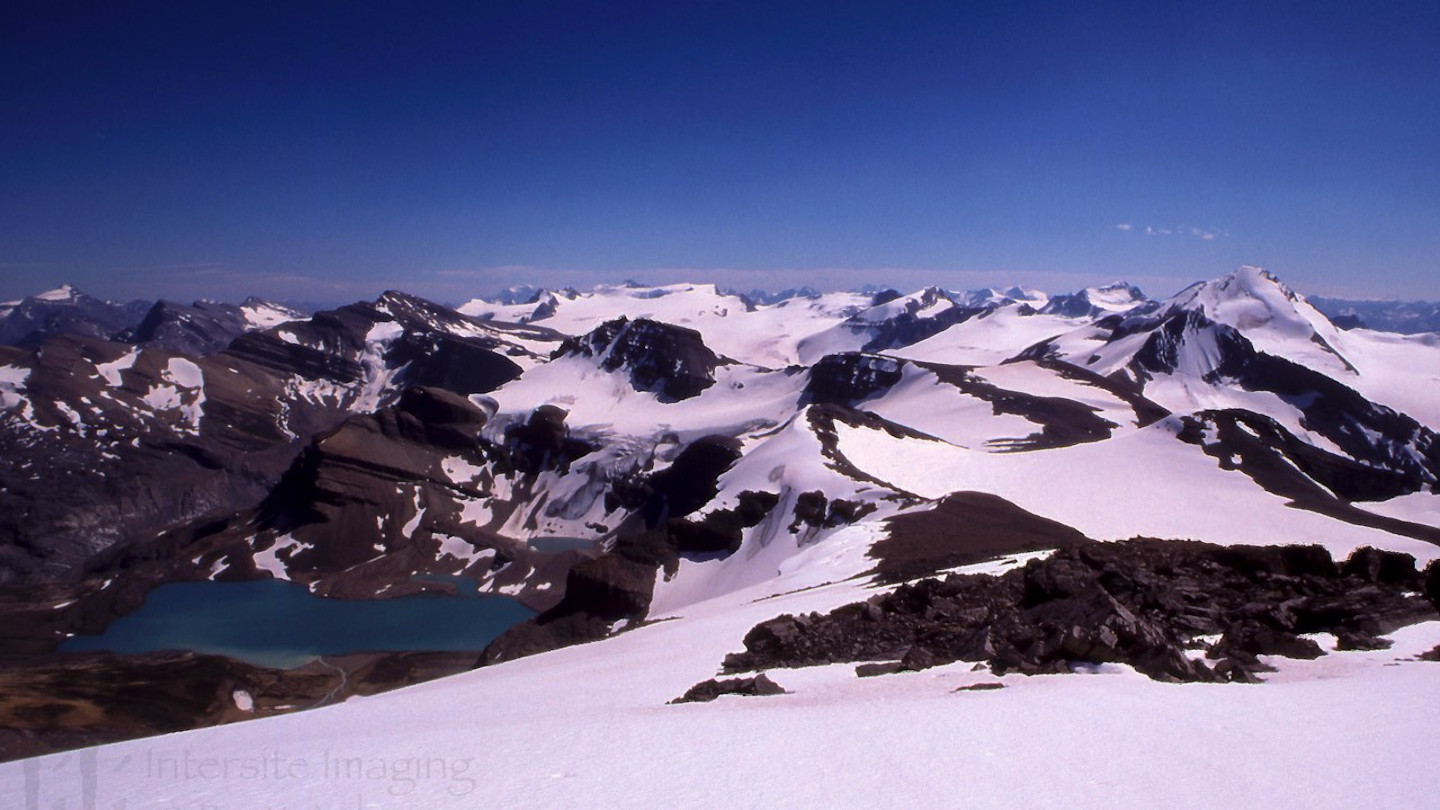
View from Mistaya: the Wapta Icefield

== See also ==
- List of peaks on the British Columbia–Alberta border
- List of mountains in the Canadian Rockies
