= Antonie Schläger =

Austrian opera singer (1859–1910)

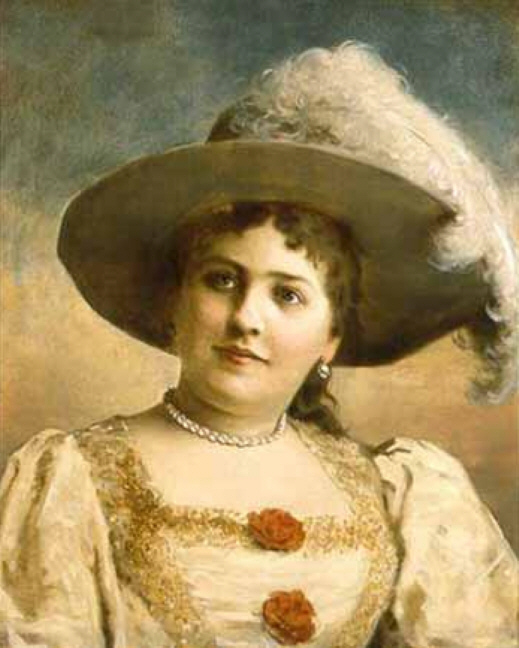
Schläger c. 1890

Antonie Schläger (4 May 1859 – 29 August 1910) was an Austrian operatic soprano and mezzo-soprano, taking leading roles in Vienna at the Carltheater and at the Court Opera.

== Life ==
Schläger (originally Lautenschläger) was born in the Simmering district of Vienna in 1859, daughter of a grocer. She first worked in a type foundry; from the age of 17 she sang in the chorus of the Carltheater in Vienna. She took singing lessons with Johann Brandl, conductor of the theatre orchestra, and in 1879 played her first role in the Carltheater, as a ship cadet in Charles Lecocq's operetta Les cent vierges. This was followed by leading roles there in operettas by Jacques Offenbach, Johann Strauss II and Franz von Suppé.

After taking acting lessons with Josef Lewinsky, she appeared from 1882 at the Vienna Court Opera, in that year as Valentin in Les Huguenots by Giacomo Meyerbeer, and belonged to the theatre's ensemble from 1883 to 1896. Afterwards she appeared as a concert singer, and as a guest singer at the Theater an der Wien and at the Court Opera. In 1894 she married Victor von Theumer, an officer.

Gustav Mahler's efforts to bring her back to the Court Opera failed; she ended her career and retired to her property Gstettenhof, a much-visited inn in Steinbachrotte near Türnitz. She died there in 1910.
