= Thorsten M. Schlaeger =

German biologist

Thorsten M. Schlaeger is a German American biologist who is the head of the Human Embryonic Stem Cell Core Facility of the Stem Cell Program at Boston Children's Hospital.

He studied Human Biology (Humanbiologie) at the University of Marburg and performed his Ph.D. thesis work in the laboratories of Werner Risau and Tom Sato. In 1999 he was awarded the Otto Hahn Medal of the Max Planck Society for his Ph.D. thesis on endothelial cell specific gene expression. Following his postdoctoral research in the laboratory of Stuart Orkin and a short foray into industry, he re-joined Boston Children's Hospital where he works with Leonard I. Zon and George Q. Daley to develop induced pluripotent stem cell based transfusion and transplantation products. His laboratory focuses on human pluripotent stem cell biology, genome editing, reprogramming, laboratory automation, chemical genetics, and imaging technologies.

Google Scholar shows that ten of his papers have been cited more than 100 times each.
