= Pierre Barbet (writer) =

French science fiction writer and pharmacist

Claude Avice
- Born: 16 May 1925
- Died: 20 June 1995 (aged 70)
- Occupation: science fiction writer
- Writing career
- Pen name: Pierre Barbet
- Language: French

See also Pierre Barbet (physician)

Pierre Barbet (16 May 1925 – 20 July 1995) was the main pseudonym used by French science fiction writer and pharmacist Claude Avice. Claude Avice also used the pseudonyms of Olivier Sprigel and David Maine. Several of his novels were translated into English and published by DAW Books.

== Career ==
Pierre Barbet's first two science fiction novels, Vers un Avenir Perdu [Towards A Lost Future] (1962) and Babel 3805 (1962) were published by the Rayon Fantastique science fiction series of Hachette and Gallimard.

After the cancellation of that series during 1964, Barbet began writing for the publisher Fleuve Noir's Anticipation series during 1966, and became a steady provider of classic "space operas", such as Vikings de l'Espace [Space Vikings] (1969), the tale of the conquest of the galaxy by a Viking-like warlord whose planet's sun is dying.

Barbet was among the first writers to introduce heroic fantasy to Anticipation as part of his Temporal Investigator Setni series, which started with L'Exilé du Temps [The Exile of Time] (1969). Setni was a special agent for a Galactic Federation ruled by preserved brains. Barbet followed suit with À Quoi Songent les Psyborgs? [What Do Psyborgs Dream About?] (1971), in which Setni explores a planet where a trio of powerful, disembodied brains have recreated the fantasy legends of Amadis of Gaul for their own entertainment. He continued to use this theme with La Planète Enchantée (1973) and Vénusine (1977), the latter written under the pseudonym Olivier Sprigel. He also wrote an alternate history, L'Empire du Baphomet [The Empire of Baphomet] (1972), in which an alien attempts to manipulate the Knights Templar to assume control of the world during the Crusades, and a sequel, Croisade Stellaire [Stellar Crusade] (1974), in which the Templars go into space to conquer Baphomet's people and convert them to Christianity. These two books were translated later into English as Baphomet's Meteor and Stellar Crusade, and published together as Cosmic Crusaders (1980).

Barbet's other notable novels included the Napoleons of Eridani trilogy (1970–84), in which a squadron of Napoleonic soldiers kidnapped by aliens conquer a space empire, a theme reminiscent of Poul Anderson's High Crusade and the author's earlier L'Empire du Baphomet. His other series included the adventures of the dashing Alex Courville, a hero not unlike Anderson's Dominic Flandry, and the saga of the Cities in Space (1979–85), reminiscent of James Blish's renowned series.

== Selected bibliography ==
- Vers un Avenir Perdu (Towards A Lost Future) (1962)
- Babel 3805 (1962)
- Les Limiers de l'Infini (The Trackers of Infinity) (1966)
- Les Cavernicoles de Wolf (The Cavern-Dwellers of Wolf) (1966)
- L'Étoile du Néant (The Void Star) (1967)
- Le Secret des Quasars (The Secret of the Quasars) (1967)
- Hallali Cosmique (Cosmic Hunt) (1967)
- La Planète des Cristophons (The Planet of the Christophons) (1968)
- Évolution Magnétique (Magnetic Evolution) (1968)
- Vikings de l'Espace (Space Vikings) (1969)
- Les Chimères de Seginus (The Chimeras of Seginus) (1969)
- L'Exilé du Temps (The Exile of Time) (1969)
- Étoiles en Perdition (Doomed Stars) (1970)
- Les Maîtres des Pulsars (The Masters of the Pulsars) (1970)
- Les Grognards d'Éridan (1970); translated as The Napoleons of Eridanus (1976)
- L'Agonie de la Voie Lactée (The Agony of the Milky Way) (1970)
- Les Conquistadores d'Andromède (The Conquistadores of Andromeda) (1971)
- Le Transmetteur de Ganymède (The Ganymede Transmitter) (1971)
- Azraec de Virgo (Azraec of Virgo) (1971)
- A Quoi Songent les Psyborgs? (1971); translated as Games Psyborgs Play (1973)
- L'Empire du Baphomet (1972); translated as Baphomet's Meteor (1972)
- Les Insurgés de Laucor (The Insurgents of Laucor) (1972)
- La Planète Empoisonnée (The Poisoned Planet) (1972)
- Tremplins d'Étoiles (Jumping Point to the Stars) (1972)
- Les Disparus du Club Chronos (The Disappearances of the Chronos Club) (As David Maine) (1972)
- La Planète Enchantée (1973); translated as The Enchanted Planet (1975)
- Liane de Noldaz (1973); translated as The Joan of Arc Replay (1978)
- Les Bioniques d'Atria (The Bionics of Atria) (1973)
- Le Bâtard d'Orion (The Bastard of Orion) (1973)
- L'Univers des Géons (The Universe of the Geons) (1974)
- Magiciens Galactiques (Galactic Magicians) (1974)
- Les Mercenaires de Rychna (The Mercenaries of Rychna) (1974)
- Croisade Stellaire (1974); sequel to L'Empire du Baphomet; translated as Stellar Crusade and published together with Baphomet's Meteor as Cosmic Crusaders (1980)
- La Nymphe de l'Espace (The Space Nymph) (1975)
- Patrouilleur du Néant (Void Patrol) (1976)
- Ambassade Galactique (Galactic Embassy) (1976)
- Guérilléro Galactique (Galactic Guerillero) (As David Maine) (1976)
- Crépuscule du Futur (Twilight of the Future) (As Olivier Sprigel) (1976)
- Vénusine (As Olivier Sprigel) (1977)
- Commandos sur Commande (Commandos To Order) (1978)
- Odyssée Galactique (Galactic Odyssey) (1978)
- Lendemains Incertains (Uncertain Futures) (As Olivier Sprigel) (1978)
- Trafic Stellaire (Interstellar Traffic) (1979)
- Oasis de l'Espace (Space Oasis) (1979)
- Périple Galactique (Galactic Journey) (1980)
- Le Maréchal Rebelle (The Rebel Marshal) (1980)
- Renaissance Planétaire (Planetary Rebirth) (As David Maine) (1980)
- Cité des Astéroïdes (City of the Asteroids) (1981)
- Les Psychos de Logir (The Psychos of Logir) (1981)
- Cités Interstellaires (Interstellar Cities) (1982)
- Survivants de l'Apocalypse (Survivors of the Apocalypse) (1982)
- Invasion Cosmique (Cosmic Invasion) (As David Maine) (1982)
- L'Empereur d'Éridan (1982); translated as The Emperor of Eridanus (1983)
- Les Charognards de Snien (The Carrion-Eaters of Snien) (1983)
- Rome Doit Être Detruite (Rome Must Be Destroyed) (1983)
- Les Colons d'Éridan (The Eridani Colonists) (1984)
- Carthage Sera Détruite (Carthago Will Be Destroyed) (1984)
- Eldorado Stellaire (Interstellar Eldorado) (1985)
- Cités Biotiques (Biotic Cities) (1985)
- Téléclones (1985)
- Putsch Galactique (Galactic Putsch) (1985)
- Glaciation Nucléaire (Nuclear Ice Age) (1986)
- La Croisade des Assassins (The Assassins' Crusade) (1986)
- Temps Changeants (Changing Times) (1986)
- Défense Spatiale (Space Defense) (1987)
- Captifs de Corvus (Prisoners of Corvus) (1987)
- Un Reich de 1000 Ans (A 1000-Year Reich) (1987)
- Objectif: Mars 2005 (Target: Mars 2005) (1987)
- Option Zéro (Zero Option) (1988)
- Soleil de Mort (Death Sun) (1990)
- L'Ere du Spatiopithèque (The Era of the Spatiopithecus) (1991)
