= Gerold Bepler =

German physician

Gerold Bepler is the former president and chief executive officer of the Barbara Ann Karmanos Cancer Institute in Detroit, Michigan.

== Biography ==
Bepler received his medical and doctoral degrees from the Philipps University School of Medicine and Dentistry of the University of Marburg in Marburg, Germany. His postdoctoral fellowships were at the National Cancer Institute, Philipps University and at Duke University Medical Center.

He held positions at Duke University Hospital and Durham VA Medical Center, and then as director of the Lung Cancer Program at Roswell Park Comprehensive Cancer Center in Buffalo, N.Y. He was then director of the Comprehensive Lung Cancer Research Center, department chair of Thoracic Oncology, and program leader of the Lung Cancer Program at the Moffitt Cancer Center in Tampa, Florida.

He came to the Karmanos Cancer Institute in 2010.

== Professional work ==
As a thoracic oncologist, Bepler's research focuses on studying risks, progression, treatments and outcomes related to lung cancer, with an emphasis on non-small cell lung cancer. He has secured more than $65 million in cancer-related research funding since the mid-1980s. He has had articles published in the New England Journal of Medicine, the Journal of Clinical Oncology and Cancer Research.

Bepler also serves as principal investigator of the National Cancer Institute Comprehensive Cancer Center Support Grant.
