= Schlager (surname) =

Schlager is a surname. Notable people with the surname include:

- Alexander Schlager (born 1996), Austrian footballer
- Hansjörg Schlager (1948–2004), German alpine skier
- Werner Schlager (born 1972), Austrian table tennis player
- Xaver Schlager (born 1997), Austrian footballer

== See also ==
- Schläger
- Schaller (surname)
