= Mayor's Award for Excellence in Science and Technology =

The Mayor's Award for Excellence in Science and Technology is given annually to recognise important members of the science and engineering communities in New York City. Candidates must live or work in the city.

Nominations are submitted in five categories:

- Biological and Medical Sciences
- Mathematical, Physical, Engineering Sciences
- Technology
- Public Understanding of Science and Technology
- Young Investigator (for scientists and engineers under the age of 40)

The Mayor chooses winners from a list of finalists submitted by the New York Academy of Sciences and the New York City Department of Cultural Affairs.
