= Pierre Barbet (physician) =

French physician and surgeon (1884–1961)

Pierre Barbet (24 July 1883 – 17 December 1961) was a French physician, and the chief surgeon at Saint Joseph's Hospital in Paris, born in Arras.

By performing various experiments, Barbet introduced a set of theories on the crucifixion of Jesus.

In 1950 he wrote a long study called A Doctor at Calvary which was later published as a book. Barbet stated that his experience as a battlefield surgeon during World War I led him to conclude that the image on the Shroud of Turin was authentic, anatomically correct and consistent with crucifixion. As Barbet wrote, "If this is the work of a forger, than the forger would have to have been a trained anatomist, for there is not one single blunder. Indeed, anatomy bears witness to authenticity."

He died in Paris.
