= Barbetta =

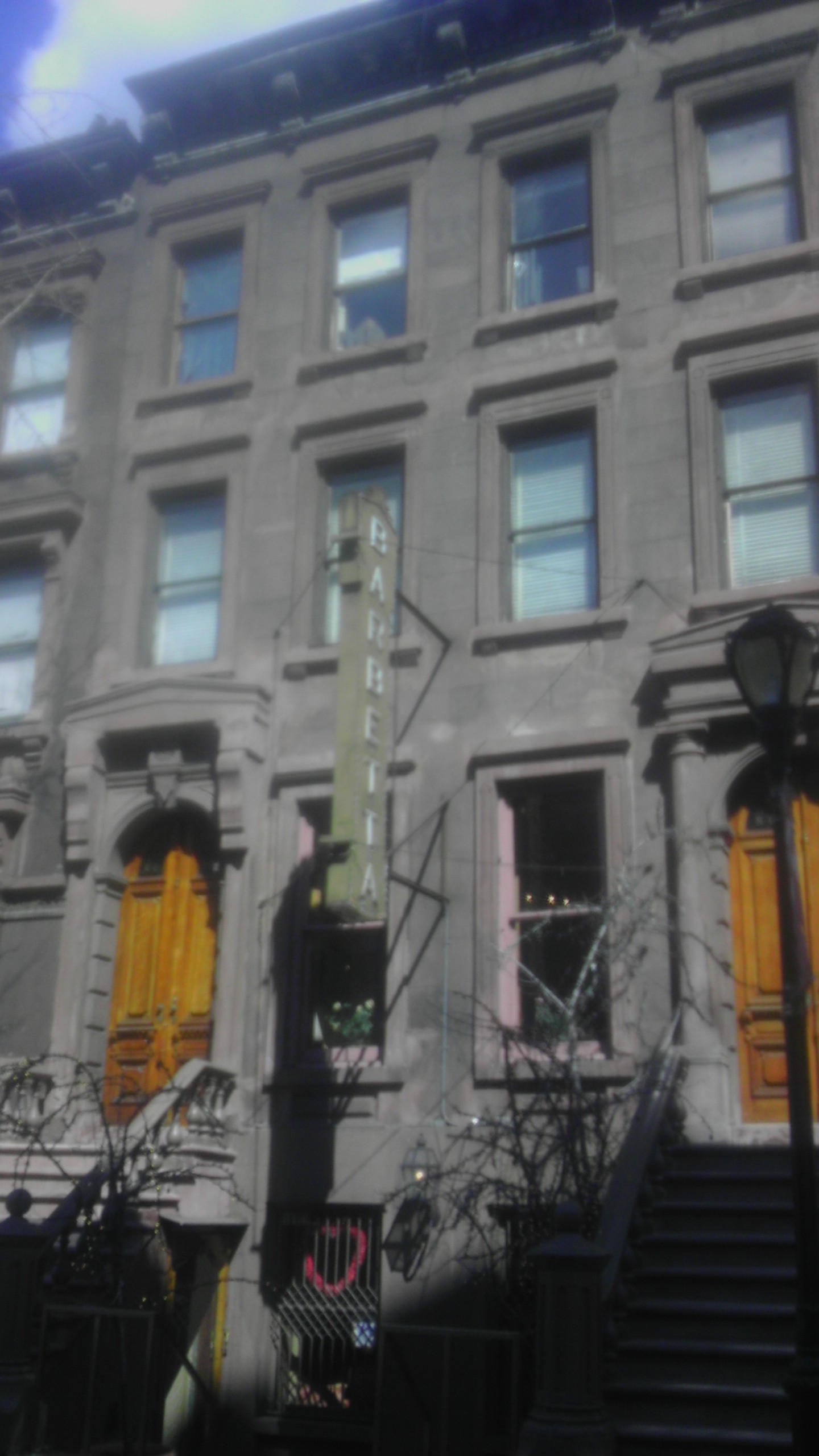
- Barbetta
- Interactive map of Barbetta

Restaurant information
- Established: 1906; 120 years ago
- Closed: February 27, 2026
- Food type: Piedmontese cuisine
- Location: 321 West 46th Street (between 8th Avenue and 9th Avenue), on the Theater District's Restaurant Row, New York City, New York, United States
- Coordinates: 40.760293°N 73.989037°W
- Website: www.barbettarestaurant.com

Barbetta was an Italian restaurant that focused on Piedmontese cuisine located at 321 West 46th Street (between 8th Avenue and 9th Avenue) on the Theater District's Restaurant Row in New York City. Founded in 1906, Barbetta was one of the city's oldest family-owned Italian restaurants was and the oldest restaurant in the Theater District. It held many other firsts from its food innovations.

Barbetta was founded in 1906 by Sebastiano Maioglio and was owned by his daughter, Laura Maioglio, who took over in 1962. Laura Maioglio died on January 17, 2026, at age 93.

The restaurant closed for business on February 27, 2026.

== Innovations ==
Barbetta was the first Italian restaurant to present white truffles "on a continuous and regular basis during the truffle season" and was one of the first restaurants in Manhattan to add a garden for dining outdoors.

== Recognition ==
Barbetta was the first restaurant in America to have received landmark status from the Locali Storici d'Italia when it was designated Locale Storico (Historic Establishment). The restaurant also appeared in various films and TV shows.

In 2013, Zagat gave it a food rating of 22.
