= List of members of the National Academy of Sciences (immunology and inflammation) =

This list is a subsection of the List of members of the National Academy of Sciences, which includes more than 7,000 members and international members of the United States National Academy of Sciences, both living and deceased, each affiliated with one of 31 disciplinary sections. Members are listed under their primary section, and each person's name, primary institution, and election year are given. For deceased members, the year of death is noted.

== Immunology and inflammation ==
Name	Institution	Year
Rafi Ahmed	Emory University School of Medicine	2009
Shizuo Akira	Osaka University	2009
James Allison	The University of Texas MD Anderson Cancer Center	1997
Frederick Alt	Boston Children's Hospital	1994
D. Bernard Amos (died 2003)	Duke University	1983
Christopher Andrewes (died 1988)	National Institute for Medical Research	1964
Brigitte Askonas (died 2013)	University of London	2007
K. Frank Austen (died 2023)	Harvard University	1974
Baruj Benacerraf (died 2011)	Harvard University	1972
Christophe Benoist	Harvard Medical School	2005
Michael J. Bevan	University of Washington	2008
Barry Bloom	Harvard T.H. Chan School of Public Health	1987
Jeffrey Bluestone	Sonoma BioTherapeutics	2023
Thierry Boon	Ludwig Institute for Cancer Research Ltd.	2006
Edward Boyse (died 2007)	University of Arizona	1979
Michael B. Brenner	Harvard Medical School	2007
Rebecca Buckley	Duke University Medical Center	2011
Macfarlane Burnet (died 1985)	Walter and Eliza Hall Institute of Medical Research	1954
Harvey Cantor	Dana-Farber Cancer Institute	2002
Jean-Laurent Casanova	The Rockefeller University	2015
Merrill Chase (died 2004)	Rockefeller University	1975
Zhijian James Chen	UT Southwestern Medical Center	2014
Robert L. Coffman	University of California, Santa Cruz	2006
Marco Colonna	Washington University School of Medicine in St. Louis	2019
Max Dale Cooper	Emory University School of Medicine	1988
Gerald Crabtree	Stanford University School of Medicine	1997
Peter Cresswell	Yale School of Medicine	2001
Jason Cyster	University of California, San Francisco	2014
Gilbert Dalldorf (died 1979)	Wadsworth Center	1955
Mark Davis	Stanford University School of Medicine	1993
Betty Diamond	The Feinstein Institutes for Medical Research	2022
Charles A. Dinarello	University of Colorado Denver	1998
Frank Dixon (died 2008)	Scripps Research Institute	1971
Peter C. Doherty	University of Melbourne	1998
Michael Dustin	University of Oxford	2021
Herman Eisen (died 2014)	Massachusetts Institute of Technology	1969
Zelig Eshhar (died 2025)	Weizmann Institute of Science	2022
Anthony Fauci	Georgetown University School of Medicine	1992
Douglas Fearon	Cold Spring Harbor Laboratory	2001
Marc Feldmann	University of Oxford	2010
Alain Fischer	Collège de France	2019
Katherine A. Fitzgerald	University of Massachusetts Chan Medical School	2021
Richard Flavell	Yale School of Medicine	2002
Edward C. Franklin (died 1982)	New York University	1979
Gordon Freeman	Dana-Farber Cancer Institute	2022
K. Christopher Garcia	Stanford University	2012
James H. Gear (died 1994)	Government of South Africa	1978
Ronald Germain	National Institutes of Health	2016
Richard K. Gershon (died 1983)	Yale University	1980
Sankar Ghosh	Columbia University Vagelos College of Physicians and Surgeons	2021
Laurie Glimcher	Dana-Farber Cancer Institute	2002
Robert A. Good (died 2003)	University of South Florida	1970
Christopher Goodnow	Garvan Institute of Medical Research	2013
James Gowans (died 2020)	University of Oxford	1985
Douglas R. Green	St. Jude Children's Research Hospital	2020
Philip Greenberg	Fred Hutchinson Cancer Center	2023
Howard Grey (died 2019)	La Jolla Institute for Allergy and Immunology	1999
Stephen Hedrick	University of California, San Diego	2024
Michael Heidelberger (died 1991)	New York University	1942
Jules A. Hoffmann	Centre National de la Recherche Scientifique	2008
Kristin Hogquist	University of Minnesota	2022
Tasuku Honjo	Kyoto University Graduate School of Medicine	2001
Leroy Hood	Institute for Systems Biology	1982
John H. Humphrey (died 1987)	University of London	1986
Kimishige Ishizaka (died 2018)	The Institute of Physical and Chemical Research, Japan	1983
Akiko Iwasaki	Yale School of Medicine	2018
Charles Janeway (died 2003)	Yale University	2000
Marc K. Jenkins	University of Minnesota	2020
Niels Kaj Jerne (died 1994)	Danish National Serum Institute	1975
Carl H. June	University of Pennsylvania	2020
Susan Kaech	Salk Institute for Biological Studies	2024
John Kappler	National Jewish Health	1989
Klas Kärre	Karolinska Institutet	2025
Tadamitsu Kishimoto	Osaka University	1991
Marian Koshland (died 1997)	University of California, Berkeley	1981
Henry Kunkel (died 1983)	Rockefeller University	1967
Lewis Lanier	University of California, San Francisco	2010
Antonio Lanzavecchia	Vir Biotechnology	2016
Henry Sherwood Lawrence (died 2004)	New York University	1972
Michael J. Lenardo	Calico	2019
Warren Leonard	National Institutes of Health	2015
Ronald Levy	Stanford University	2008
Judy Lieberman	Harvard Medical School	2020
Dan Littman	New York University Grossman School of Medicine	2004
Richard M. Locksley	University of California, San Francisco	2017
Andre Michel Lwoff (died 1994)	Pasteur Institute	1955
Ravinder Maini	Imperial College London	2010
Tak Wah Mak	University of Toronto	2002
Alberto Mantovani	Humanitas University	2024
Philippa Marrack	National Jewish Health	1989
Diane Mathis	Harvard Medical School	2003
Manfred M. Mayer (died 1984)	Johns Hopkins University	1979
Walsh McDermott (died 1981)	Cornell University	1967
Hugh McDevitt (died 2022)	Stanford University	1977
Andrew J. McMichael	University of Oxford	2025
Ruslan Medzhitov	Yale School of Medicine	2010
Ira Mellman	Parker Institute for Cancer Immunotherapy	2011
Miriam Merad	Icahn School of Medicine at Mount Sinai	2020
Henry Metzger (died 2018)	National Institutes of Health	1992
Jacques Miller	The Walter and Eliza Hall Institute of Medical Research	1982
Cesar Milstein (died 2002)	MRC Laboratory of Molecular Biology	1981
N. Avrion Mitchison (died 2022)	University College London	1990
Hans J. Muller-Eberhard (died 1998)	The University of Texas-Houston Health Science Center	1974
Kenneth Murphy	Washington University School of Medicine in St. Louis	2016
Cornelis Murre	University of California, San Diego	2025
Shigekazu Nagata	Osaka University	2015
Carl F. Nathan	Weill Cornell Medical College	2011
Stanley Nathenson (died 2012)	Yeshiva University	1988
Michael Neuberger (died 2013)	MRC Laboratory of Molecular Biology	2013
Alfred Nisonoff (died 2001)	Johns Hopkins University	1984
Gustav Nossal	University of Melbourne	1979
Michel C. Nussenzweig	The Rockefeller University	2011
Anne O'Garra	The Francis Crick Institute	2024
John Joseph O'Shea Jr	National Institutes of Health	2023
Lloyd Old (died 2011)	Ludwig Institute for Cancer Research	1978
Jacques Oudin (died 1985)	Institut Pasteur	1974
William Paul (died 2015)	National Institutes of Health	1982
Hidde L. Ploegh	Boston Children's Hospital	2016
Rodney R. Porter (died 1985)	University of Oxford	1972
Michael Potter (died 2013)	National Institutes of Health	1981
Fiona Powrie	University of Oxford	2020
Gabriel A. Rabinovich	University of Buenos Aires	2016
Klaus Rajewsky	Max-Delbruck-Center for Molecular Medicine	1994
David H. Raulet	University of California, Berkeley	2019
Jeffrey Ravetch	The Rockefeller University	2006
Aviv Regev	Genentech	2019
Michael Reth	University of Freiburg	2018
Ellen Rothenberg	California Institute of Technology	2021
Alexander Rudensky	Memorial Sloan Kettering Cancer Center	2012
Shimon Sakaguchi	Osaka University	2012
Federica Sallusto	ETH Zurich	2022
Matthew Scharff	Albert Einstein College of Medicine	1982
David G. Schatz	Yale School of Medicine	2018
Stuart Schlossman (died 2023)	Albert Einstein College of Medicine	1992
Robert D. Schreiber	Washington University School of Medicine	2013
Michael Sela (died 2022)	Weizmann Institute of Science	1976
Arlene Sharpe	Harvard Medical School	2018
Donald Shreffler (died 1994)	Washington University in St. Louis	1982
George Davis Snell (died 1996)	The Jackson Laboratory	1970
Jonathan Sprent	Garvan Institute of Medical Research	2017
Thomas Earl Starzl (died 2017)	University of Pittsburgh	2014
Lawrence Steinman	Stanford University	2015
Ralph M. Steinman (died 2011)	Rockefeller University	2001
Jack L. Strominger (died 2022)	Harvard University	1970
David Talmage (died 2014)	University of Colorado Health Sciences Center	1976
Tadatsugu Taniguchi	University of Tokyo	2003
Lewis Thomas (died 1993)	Cornell University	1972
Jenny P.Y. Ting	The University of North Carolina at Chapel Hill	2022
Giorgio Trinchieri	National Cancer Institute	2024
Shannon Turley	Amgen	2025
Jonathan Uhr (died 2024)	UT Southwestern Medical Center at Dallas	1984
Emil R. Unanue (died 2022)	Washington University in St. Louis	1987
Johannes van Rood (died 2017)	Eurotransplant	1993
Ellen Vitetta	UT Southwestern Medical Center	1994
Ulrich von Andrian	Harvard Medical School	2023
Thomas A. Waldmann (died 2021)	National Institutes of Health	1985
Casey Weaver	University of Alabama at Birmingham	2022
Martin Weigert	University of Chicago	1999
Arthur Weiss	University of California, San Francisco	2003
Irving Weissman (died 2020)	Stanford University School of Medicine	1989
Edward John Wherry III	University of Pennsylvania	2025
Hao Wu	Boston Children's Hospital	2015
Wayne Yokoyama	Washington University School of Medicine in St. Louis	2007
Rolf M. Zinkernagel	University Hospital of Zurich	1996
