= American Association of Immunologists Lifetime Achievement Award =

The American Association of Immunologists Lifetime Achievement Award is the highest honor bestowed by the American Association of Immunologists (AAI). It has been awarded annually to a single AAI member since 1994.

== Winners ==
Date	Name	Institution
2025	Leslie J. Berg, Ph.D.	University of Colorado School of Medicine
2024	Gary Koretzky, M.D., Ph.D.	Weill Cornell Medicine
2023	Lewis Lanier, M.D., Ph.D.	University of California, San Francisco
2022	Arlene H. Sharpe, M.D., Ph.D.	Harvard Medical School
2020	Marc K. Jenkins, Ph.D.	University of Minnesota
2019	Pamela J. Fink, Ph.D.	University of Washington
2018	Laurie H. Glimcher, M.D.	Dana–Farber Cancer Institute, Harvard Medical School
2017	Richard J. Hodes, M.D.	NIA, NIH
2016	Olivera J. Finn, Ph.D.	University of Pittsburgh School of Medicine
2015	Jonathan Sprent, M.B.B.S., Ph.D.	Garvan Institute of Medical Research
2014	Emil R. Unanue, M.D.	Washington University School of Medicine in St. Louis
2013	Katherine L. Knight, Ph.D.	Stritch School of Medicine, Loyola University Chicago
2012	Arthur Weiss, M.D., Ph.D.	HHMI, University of California, San Francisco
2011	James P. Allison, Ph.D.	HHMI, Memorial Sloan Kettering Cancer Center
2010	Susan L. Swain, Ph.D.	Trudeau Institute
2009	Steven J. Burakoff, M.D.	Tisch Cancer Institute, Mount Sinai Medical Center
2008	Robert R. Rich, M.D.	University of Alabama School of Medicine, Birmingham
2007	Ellen S. Vitetta, Ph.D.	University of Texas Southwestern Medical Center
2006	Hugh O. McDevitt, M.D., Ph.D.	Stanford University School of Medicine
2005	Anthony S. Fauci, M.D.	NIAID, NIH
2004	Richard W. Dutton, Ph.D.	Trudeau Institute
2003	Philippa Marrack, Ph.D.	HHMI, National Jewish Medical and Research Center
2002	William E. Paul, M.D.	NIAID, NIH
2001	Charles A. Janeway, Jr., M.D.	HHMI, Yale School of Medicine
2000	Max D. Cooper, M.D.	HHMI, University of Alabama, Birmingham
1999	Henry Metzger, M.D.	NIAMS, NIH
1998	Leonard A. Herzenberg, Ph.D.	Stanford University School of Medicine
1997	Herman N. Eisen, M.D.	Massachusetts Institute of Technology
1996	Frank W. Fitch, M.D., Ph.D.	University of Chicago
1995	Elvin A. Kabat, Ph.D.	Columbia University
1994	David W. Talmage, M.D.	University of Colorado

== See also ==
- List of medicine awards
