= American Association of Immunologists =

International scientific society

The American Association of Immunologists
- Abbreviation: AAI
- Formation: 1913
- Type: Scientific society
- Headquarters: Bethesda, Maryland
- Fields: Immunology
- Members: Over 7,000 (2026)
- President: Avery August (2026-2027)
- Website: www.aai.org

The American Association of Immunologists (AAI) is a professional scientific society founded in 1913 to advance the field of immunology and promote understanding of the immune system and its role in health and disease. AAI publishes scientific journals, convenes an annual meeting, provides education and career development programs, and engages in public policy and advocacy related to biomedical research and public health.

== History ==
The AAI was founded on June 19, 1913. The original 41 members of the society were all disciples of Almroth Wright, the founder and director of the Inoculation Department at St. Mary's Hospital in London. The first AAI annual meeting was held in Atlantic City, New Jersey, on June 22, 1914.

AAI established The Journal of Immunology in the early years of the organization.

== Organization ==
AAI is headquartered in Bethesda, Maryland.

AAI is led by a council of eight scientists who are elected by voting members of AAI. The council includes four officers—president, vice-president, secretary-treasurer, and past president—as well as four additional councilors.

AAI relies on input from AAI members who volunteer to sit on AAI Committees for limited terms. These Committees are established to provide a diverse range of voices that represent all segments of AAI's membership. Committees carry out specific duties such as financial planning, program development, annual meeting planning, and overseeing AAI's academic journals.

== Academic Journals ==
AAI is the publisher of The Journal of Immunology and ImmunoHorizons.

== Meetings and Programs ==
=== Annual Meeting ===
AAI organizes an annual scientific meeting (IMMUNOLOGY), bringing together researchers to present findings in immunology. Scientific results presented at the meeting have included advances in experimental therapeutics and drug discovery.

=== Education and career development ===
AAI provides fellowships, mentoring programs, and training initiatives to support scientists at various career stages.

== Advocacy and public policy ==
AAI engages in public policy and advocacy related to biomedical research funding, vaccination, and public health.

The organization has participated in coalitions of scientific societies emphasizing the importance of vaccines and countering misinformation.

AAI has been among medical organizations responding to U.S. health policy developments and vaccine-related controversies.

AAI has also contributed to public discourse on vaccine policy and public health in major media coverage discussing federal health leadership and vaccine policy shifts.

Proposed federal budget reductions affecting biomedical research institutions such as the National Institutes of Health have also been widely debated in policy discussions covered by national media.

== Public Outreach ==
AAI conducts initiatives to improve public understanding of immunology, including educational resources and outreach programs such as Immunology Explained.

== Membership ==
AAI has 7,700 members in 68 countries. Its membership includes principal investigators, postdoctoral fellows, graduate students, administrators, and other professionals dedicated to furthering the study of immunology.

== Nobel laureates ==
Since 1919, 27 AAI members have been awarded the Nobel Prize. All laureates received the Nobel Prize in Physiology or Medicine, except where indicated.

- Jules Bordet, 1919
- Karl O. Landsteiner, 1930
- Alexander Fleming, 1945
- Wendell M. Stanley, 1946 (chemistry)
- John F. Enders, 1954
- Frederick C. Robbins, 1954
- Thomas H. Weller, 1954
- F. Macfarlane Burnet, 1960
- Peter Medawar, 1960
- Alfred D. Hershey, 1969
- Salvador E. Luria, 1969
- Gerald M. Edelman, 1972
- Rodney R. Porter, 1972
- David Baltimore, 1975
- Baruj Benacerraf, 1980
- Jean Dausset, 1980
- Niels K. Jerne, 1984
- César Milstein, 1984
- Georges J. F. Köhler, 1984
- Susumu Tonegawa, 1987
- Peter C. Doherty, 1996
- Rolf M. Zinkernagel, 1996
- Stanley B. Prusiner, 1997
- Bruce A. Beutler, 2011
- Ralph M. Steinman, 2011
- James P. Allison, 2018
- Tasuku Honjo, 2018

== Past presidents ==
- Gerald B. Webb (1913–1915)
- James W. Jobling (1915–1916)
- Richard Weil (1916–1917)
- John A. Kolmer (1917–1918)
- William Hallock Park (1918–1919)
- Hans Zinsser (1919–1920)
- Rufus Cole (1920–1921)
- Frederick P. Gay (1921–1922)
- George W. McCoy (1922–1923)
- H. Gideon Wells (1923–1924)
- Frederick George Novy (1924–1925)
- Wilfred H. Manwaring (1925–1926)
- Ludvig Hektoen (1926–1927)
- Karl Landsteiner (1927–1928)
- Eugene Lindsay Opie (1928–1929)
- Oswald Avery (1929–1930)
- Stanhope Bayne-Jones (1930–1931)
- Alphonse Dochez (1931–1932)
- Augustus B. Wadsworth (1932–1933)
- Thomas Milton Rivers (1933–1934)
- Francis Gilman Blake (1934–1935)
- Warfield T. Longcope (1935–1936)
- Sanford B. Hooker (1936–1937)
- Carl TenBroeck (1937–1938)
- Donald T. Fraser (1938–1939)
- George P. Berry (1939–1940)
- Karl Friedrich Meyer (1940–1941)
- Paul R. Cannon (1941–1942)
- Jacques J. Bronfenbrenner (1942–1946)
- Michael Heidelberger (1946–1947)
- Lloyd D. Felton (1947–1948)
- Michael Heidelberger (1948–1949)
- Thomas Francis, Jr. (1949–1950)
- Geoffrey Edsall (1950–1951)
- Colin Munro MacLeod (1951–1952)
- John Franklin Enders (1952–1953)
- Thomas P. Magill (1953–1954)
- Alwin Max Pappenheimer, Jr. (1954–1955)
- Jules T. Freund (1955–1956)
- Merrill Chase (1956–1957)
- John H. Dingle (1957–1958)
- Joseph Edward Smadel (1958–1959)
- William C. Boyd (1959–1960)
- Albert H. Coons (1960–1961)
- Rebecca Lancefield (1961–1962)
- Werner Henle (1962–1963)
- F. Sargent Cheever (1963–1964)
- Harry Eagle (1964–1965)
- Elvin A. Kabat (1965–1966)
- Edwin H. Lennette (1966–1967)
- Frank Horsfall (1967–1968)
- Herman N. Eisen (1968–1969)
- Karl Habel (1969–1970)
- Byron H. Waksman (1970–1971)
- Frank J. Dixon (1971–1972)
- Dan H. Campbell (1972–1973)
- Baruj Benacerraf (1973–1974)
- Henry G. Kunkel (1974–1975)
- Robert A. Good (1975–1976)
- Manfred M. Mayer (1976–1977)
- K. Frank Austen (1977–1978)
- David Talmage (1978–1979)
- Irwin H. Lepow (1979–1980)
- D. Bernard Amos (1980–1981)
- Hugh McDevitt (1981–1982)
- Marian Koshland (1982–1983)
- Jonathan W. Uhr (1983–1984)
- Kimishige Ishizaka (1984–1985)
- Barry R. Bloom (1985–1986)
- William E. Paul (1986–1987)
- Donald C. Shreffler (1987–1988)
- Max D. Cooper (1988–1989)
- G. Jeanette Thorbecke (1989–1990)
- Alfred Nisonoff (1990–1991)
- Henry Metzger (1991–1992)
- Frank W. Fitch (1992–1993)
- Ellen Vitetta (1993–1994)
- Irving Weissman (1994–1995)
- Richard W. Dutton (1995–1996)
- Katherine L. Knight (1996–1997)
- Charles Janeway (1997–1998)
- Jonathan Sprent (1998–1999)
- Roger Perlmutter (1999–2000)
- Philippa Marrack (2000–2001)
- James P. Allison (2001–2002)
- Paul W. Kincade (2002–2003)
- Laurie H. Glimcher (2003–2004)
- Susan L. Swain (2004–2005)
- Paul M. Allen (2005–2006)
- Lewis L. Lanier (2006–2007)
- Olivera J. Finn (2007–2008)
- Arthur Weiss (2008–2009)
- Betty Diamond (2009–2010)
- Jeffrey A. Frelinger (2010–2011)
- Leslie J. Berg (2011–2012)
- Gail A. Bishop (2012–2013)
- Marc K. Jenkins (2013–2014)
- Linda A. Sherman (2014–2015)
- Dan R. Littman (2015–2016)
- Arlene Sharpe (2016–2017)
- Wayne M. Yokoyama (2017–2018)
- JoAnne L. Flynn (2018–2019)
- Jeremy M. Boss (2019–2020)
- Jenny P.-Y. Ting (2020–2021)
- Gary A. Koretzky (2021–2022)
- Mark M. Davis (2022–2023)
- Akiko Iwasaki (2023–2024)
- Stephen C. Jameson (2024-2025)

== See also ==
- British Society for Immunology
- Spanish Society for Immunology
- International Union of Immunological Societies
