= JoAnne Flynn =

American microbiologist and immunologist

- Education: University of California, Davis (BS); University of California, Berkeley (PhD)
- Scientific career
- Fields: Microbiology, pathogenesis
- Workplaces: Howard Hughes Medical Institute; Albert Einstein College of Medicine; University of Pittsburgh School of Medicine
- Doctoral advisor: Dennis E. Ohman

JoAnne L. Flynn is an American microbiologist and immunologist. She is a distinguished professor at the University of Pittsburgh School of Medicine where she researches mycobacterium tuberculosis pathogenesis and immunology. She was president of the American Association of Immunologists.

== Education ==
JoAnne L. Flynn completed a B.S. in biochemistry at University of California, Davis in 1982. She earned a Ph.D. in microbial genetics and pathogenic mechanisms at University of California, Berkeley. Her doctoral advisor was Dennis E. Ohman. Flynn was a postdoctoral fellow from October 1987 to June 1990 at the Scripps Research Institute Graduate Program in the microbial genetics clinic in the department of molecular biology. Her advisor was Magdalene So.

== Career and research ==
Flynn was a research associate at the Howard Hughes Medical Institute and the Albert Einstein College of Medicine from June 1990 to December 1993. Her advisor was Barry Bloom. She is a distinguished professor in the department of microbiology and molecular genetics at the University of Pittsburgh School of Medicine.

From 2018 to 2019, Flynn was president of the American Association of Immunologists.

Her research interests include mycobacterium tuberculosis pathogenesis and immunology.

== See also ==
- Timeline of women in science in the United States
