= James Wesley Jobling =

American immunologist

- Born: 1876
- Died: 1961 (aged 84–85)
- Education: Tennessee Medical College
- Scientific career
- Fields: immunology
- Workplaces: Rockefeller Institute for Medical Research; Columbia University; Vanderbilt University

James Wesley Jobling (1876–1961) was an American physician who was a longtime professor at Columbia University College of Physicians and Surgeons and second president of the American Association of Immunologists.

== Life ==
A graduate of Tennessee Medical College (which became part of Lincoln Memorial University) in Knoxville, Jobling served in the Philippines with the United States Army in the Spanish–American War shortly after completing his medical education. After the war, he remained in the Philippines to work with the US government-administered Serum Institute. In 1901, he supervised a large project in which thousands of rats were tested for bubonic plague, which many of them were found to be carrying and which it was feared they would spread through the city. He was the institute's director from 1902 until 1904. During his tenure as director, Manila experienced a cholera outbreak; Jobling was one of the physicians with the dangerous task of performing autopsies on suspected cholera victims, and also organized an emergency hospital in the Farola District. He eventually suffered a physical breakdown and took a leave of absence to recover in Japan, being succeeded in his work by physicians Paul C. Freer and Richard P. Strong.

After his recuperation, he returned to the United States to undertake postgraduate education at Johns Hopkins University, before traveling to Berlin to study at the Robert Koch Institute. He then joined the staff of the Rockefeller Institute for Medical Research, where he remained from 1906-1909 and where he began working with Simon Flexner. His collaboration with Flexner resulted in the discovery of the Flexner-Jobling Carcinoma, a transplantable tumor discovered in a rat; this carcinoma has served as a test material for cancer for decades, including in some of the experiments of Otto Heinrich Warburg. He left the Rockefeller Institute to become a staff pathologist at Chicago's Michael Reese Hospital, where he remained until 1913. He then left to become a professor at Columbia University College of Physicians and Surgeons, before returning to Tennessee a year later to teach at Vanderbilt University, before finally returning to Columbia in 1918. He spent the rest of his career at Columbia, before retiring in 1945.

Jobling was the second president of the American Association of Immunologists, succeeding Gerald Bertram Webb in 1915. He was one of the editors of the Journal of Immunology from 1916 until 1935. From 1925-1927, he was president of the Society for Experimental Biology and Medicine. He was a charter member of the American Association for Cancer Research.
