= Transfer factor =

Molecules involved in immune response

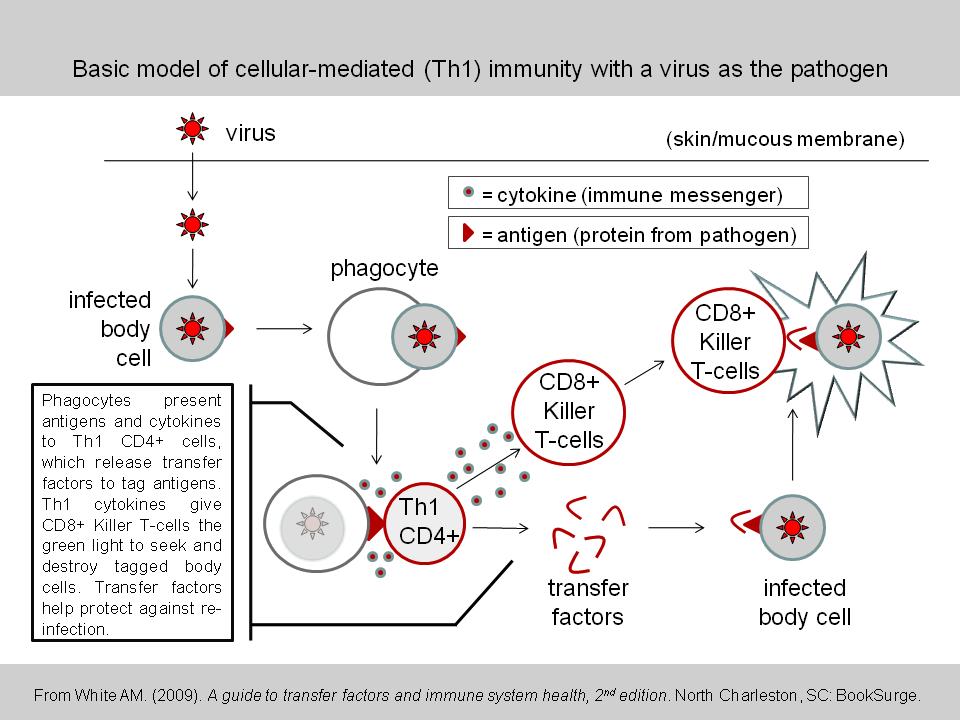
th

Transfer factors (which come from white cells called "T cells") are essentially small immune messenger molecules that are produced by all higher organisms. Transfer factors were originally described as immune molecules that are derived from blood or spleen cells that cause antigen-specific cell-mediated immunity, primarily delayed hypersensitivity and the production of lymphokines, as well as binding to the antigens themselves. They have a molecular weight of approximately 5000 daltons and are composed entirely of amino acids. Transfer factors were discovered by Henry Sherwood Lawrence in 1954.

A second use of the term transfer factor applies to a likely different entity derived from cow colostrum or chicken egg yolk which is marketed as an oral dietary supplement under the same name citing claims of benefit to the immune system.

== History ==
In 1942, Merrill Chase discovered that cells taken from the peritoneum of Guinea pigs that had been immunized against an antigen could transfer immunity when injected into Guinea pigs that had never been exposed to the antigen; this phenomenon was the discovery of cell-mediated immunity. Subsequent research attempted to uncover how the cells imparted their effects. Henry Sherwood Lawrence, in 1955, discovered that partial immunity could be transferred even when the immune cells had undergone lysis - indicating that cells did not need to be fully intact in order to produce immune effects. Lawrence went on to discover that only the factors less than 8000 daltons were required to transfer this immunity; he termed these to be "transfer factors".

The history of cellular derived transfer factor as a treatment effectively ended in the early 1980s. While the research world was initially excited by the discovery of Dr. Lawrence and the possibility that a small molecule could affect the immune system, the concept of small molecules having such profound biologic effect had not been proven. Despite several successes in using transfer factor to treat human disease and uncover immune effects, one then-prominent researcher was exposed for falsifying data related to his work on transfer factor and guinea pigs; effectively casting all of transfer factor science in a negative light. This scandal was followed shortly thereafter by the discovery of the Interleukin-1 alpha molecule and thus attention further shifted towards research on interleukins. By 1973, it was discovered that blood products could harbor viruses such as hepatitis A, indicating that transfer factor treatments derived from human or cow blood cells had the potential to transmit these diseases. With the eventual discovery of HIV/AIDS as an additional blood-borne disease most researchers viewed a product derived from blood as an unsafe treatment since screening for hepatitis B and HIV/AIDS would not be developed until after 1985. Some studies using transfer factor have been conducted after the discovery of HIV/AIDS, but almost all have been outside of the United States.

Most recently, transfer factor has been harvested from sources other than blood, and administered orally, as opposed to intravenously. This use of transfer factors from sources other than blood has not been accompanied by the same concerns associated with blood-borne diseases, since no blood is involved. Transfer factor based nutritional supplements have become extremely popular throughout the world. However the way transfer factor works is still not clear.

== Scientific claims ==
To communicate between cells, the immune system employs hormone-like signal substances; transfer factors are one class of such immune system communication substances. Transfer factors include both inducer/helper functions (Inducer Factors) and regulator functions (Regulator Factors)—historically called "suppressor functions". The Inducer Factors translate an apparently mature immune response from the donor to the recipient. Regulator Factors help control overreactions and limit allergies and autoimmune conditions. Transfer factors have been shown to induce an immune response in less than 24 hours. Transfer factors are not species-specific, thus transfer factors produced by a cow's immune system are just as effective in humans as they are in the cow.

Henry Sherwood Lawrence discovered that blood cells could 'transfer' antigen-specific cell-mediated immunity even after the cells had undergone lysis. This lymphocyte product is sometimes referred to as "dialyzable leukocyte extract" in the scientific literature due to being an extract from white blood cells undergoing dialysis to remove all molecules larger than ~5000 daltons. Studies on cellular transfer factor have involved mostly animal models and small human clinical trials. These studies have demonstrated preliminary evidence of immune modulation as well as some clinical benefits in a handful of diseases, but the studies not been assessed beyond primary sources and the trials should only be considered pre-clinical.

The exact identity (protein primary structure) of the transfer factor is unknown. HPLC studies suggest that a common part in them (at least between those targeted to different antigens, produced by mice and cattles) is the fragment LLYAQD[LV]EDN, a sequence not found in any mammalian genomes. In mice, the sequence LLYAQDLEDN alone does not "transfer" antigen-specific immunity, but does inhibit delayed-action hypersensitivity. The commercial human blood-derived product containing dialyzed buffy coat contains a number of recognizable peptides derived from proteins such as ankyrin and protein 4.1.

== Uses ==
Despite a small modicum of successes, transfer factor generated from human blood (human-derived), cow spleen (bovine-derived), or mouse spleen (murine derived) is not in routine clinical use today. A trial investigating its ability to immunize children with leukemia against shingles showed promise in a small number of patients, but represents only one of two placebo-controlled studies.

Instead, transfer factors derived from cow colostrum and/or chicken eggs yolks are used predominantly today.

== Side effects ==
=== Colostrum-derived transfer factors ===
Long-term oral administration of colostrum-derived transfer factors has been shown to be safe.

=== Blood-derived transfer factors ===
Human-derived transfer factor appears to be safe for use for up to two years and bovine-derived cellular (from blood sources) transfer factor for up to three months. Side effects include fever and swelling and pain at the injection site. Concern has been raised over the possibility of catching Bovine spongiform encephalopathy (Mad Cow Disease) or other diseases from animal blood-derived products. Transfer factors are contraindicated for women who are pregnant or breastfeeding. When human- and bovine-derived transfer factor are generated from blood cells they carry the potential for blood-borne disease such as HIV/AIDS and Hepatitis C.

== Transfer factor (dietary supplement) history, claims, and side effects ==
Colostrum is a form of milk produced by the mammary glands of mammals (including humans) in late pregnancy. Colostrum also contains multiple immune modulating molecules, including high antibody levels. Based on studies noting an overlap in the observed in vitro effects between a molecule contained in colostrum called colostrinin and the dialyzable leukocyte extract mentioned above, a hypothesis formed that the two were the same. There has been no recent research investigations comparing the two entities and thus there is no verifiable evidence that either colostrum or egg whites do or do not contain the cellular product that shares the name transfer factor. The orally available transfer factor is not obtained from humans nor from blood products of any mammal or animal and thus does not carry the presumed risks of contracting blood-borne or animal tissue derived diseases. Retailers of dietary supplement transfer factors advice against use by those with an organ transplant or women that are pregnant.

Colostrum/egg derived transfer factors have been promoted as a treatment for a large number of diseases and health concerns but have not been proven effective in the treatment of any of these conditions. The United States Food and Drug Administration regulates transfer factors as a dietary supplement and has issued a warning notice to a website selling transfer factors that they have not been proven to be effective or safe in the treatment of any condition, nor have there been any biological licenses or New Drug Applications produced for the substance.

== See also ==
- Lymphokine
