= William E. Paul =

American immunologist

William E. Paul M.D.
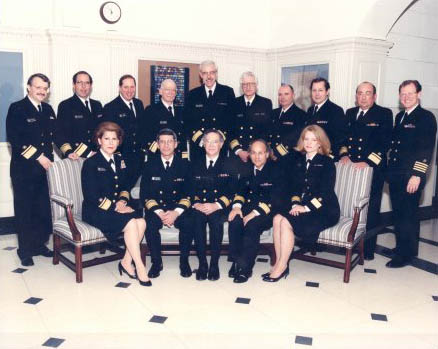
- William E. Paul (back row, third from left) as a Public Health Service officer in a group photo sometime around the 1980s
- Born: June 12, 1936
- Died: September 18, 2015 (aged 79); New York, US
- Education: M.D., SUNY Downstate College of Medicine
- Known for: AIDS Research; Interleukin 4
- Awards: American Association of Immunologists Lifetime Achievement Award; Max Delbrück Medal
- Scientific career
- Fields: Immunology
- Institutions: National Cancer Institute; National Institutes of Health, National Institute of Allergy and Infectious Disease
- Uniformed service
- Allegiance: United States
- Branch: U.S. Public Health Service Commissioned Corps
- Rank: Rear Admiral

William Erwin Paul (June 12, 1936 – September 18, 2015) was an American immunologist. He and Maureen Howard discovered interleukin 4, while an independent team led by Ellen Vitetta did the same in 1982. Paul worked on AIDS research for much of his career at the National Institutes of Health (NIH). He served as president of the American Association of Immunologists from 1986 to 1987.

== Background ==
Paul's father Jack immigrated to the United States from Ukraine with his mother and younger siblings in 1911 to join his father and other family members. While in America, Jack Paul met and married Sylvia Gleicher, a cousin of Norman Geschwind. Their son William Erwin Paul was born in Brooklyn, New York on June 12, 1936. William Paul attended Erasmus Hall High School and graduated from Andrew Jackson High School, in Queens, New York. William Paul graduated from Brooklyn College in 1956 before earning a medical degree from SUNY Downstate College of Medicine four years later.

== Career ==
Paul did his residency at the Boston Medical Center and National Cancer Institute (NCI). He joined the United States Public Health Service Commissioned Corps in 1962 and was assigned to the Endocrinology Branch of the NCI, where he worked for two years. Paul read the writings of Michael Heidelberger, and decided to train as an immunologist. A desire to collaborate with rheumatologist Alan Cohen influenced his decision as well. Paul trained at New York University with Baruj Benacerraf and later moved with him to the National Institute of Allergy and Infectious Diseases (NIAID). He succeeded Benacerraf as NIH immunology laboratory director in 1970. Upon the establishment of NIH's Office of AIDS Research in 1993, Paul was chosen as its first leader. He stepped down from that position in 1997. He also helped found NIAID's Vaccine Research Center. Paul was the founding editor of the Annual Review of Immunology from 1983 to 2011. He received the 2002 American Association of Immunologists Lifetime Achievement Award and the 2008 Max Delbrück Medal.

Paul was adjunct professor at the University of Pennsylvania School of Medicine and the Raymond and Beverly Sackler Senior Professor at Tel Aviv University.

He died in Manhattan of acute myeloid leukemia on September 18, 2015, aged 79.
