= John Dingle =

John Dingle may refer to:

- John Holmes Dingle (1908–1973), American physician and medical professor
- John T. Dingle (born before 1959), British biologist
- Johnny Dingle (born 1984), American football player
- Jon Dingle, a character in Emmerdale

== See also ==
- John Dingell Sr. (1894–1955), U.S. Representative from Michigan (served 1933–1955)
- John Dingell (1926–2019), U.S. Representative from Michigan (served 1955–2015)
