= Linda Sherman =

American immunologist

Linda A. Sherman (born 1950) is an American immunologist who researches the role of T cells in autoimmunity, particularly type 1 diabetes, in transplant rejection and in the response to tumor cells. She spent most of her career at Scripps Research (from 1978), where she has been a professor (now emeritus) of immunology and microbial sciences since 1997. She is a Distinguished Fellow of the American Association of Immunologists and served as the society's president in 2014–15.

== Early life and education ==
Sherman was born in 1950 in Brooklyn, New York, to European parents who had immigrated to the United States in 1947; her father had survived Auschwitz and her mother had also been incarcerated in a labor camp during the Second World War. They ran a small business selling shoes. Sherman's first language was Yiddish. She attended Samuel J. Tilden High School and then read physics at Barnard College.

After graduating she switched focus to biochemistry and molecular biology, and spent a year at Columbia University in New York studying biology (1971–72). Her PhD from the Massachusetts Institute of Technology, supervised by Malcolm Gefter, was on DNA replication (1976).

== Career and research ==
During her graduate study Sherman became interested in the then-novel technique of creating hybridomas, and she spent a year as a postdoctoral fellow studying this methodology at the Albert Einstein Medical School, New York (1976–77). She then spent 18 months as a postdoctoral fellow in the department of pathology of Harvard Medical School, under Steve Burakoff and Baruj Benacerraf, where she studied cellular immunology, becoming interested in T cells (1977–78).

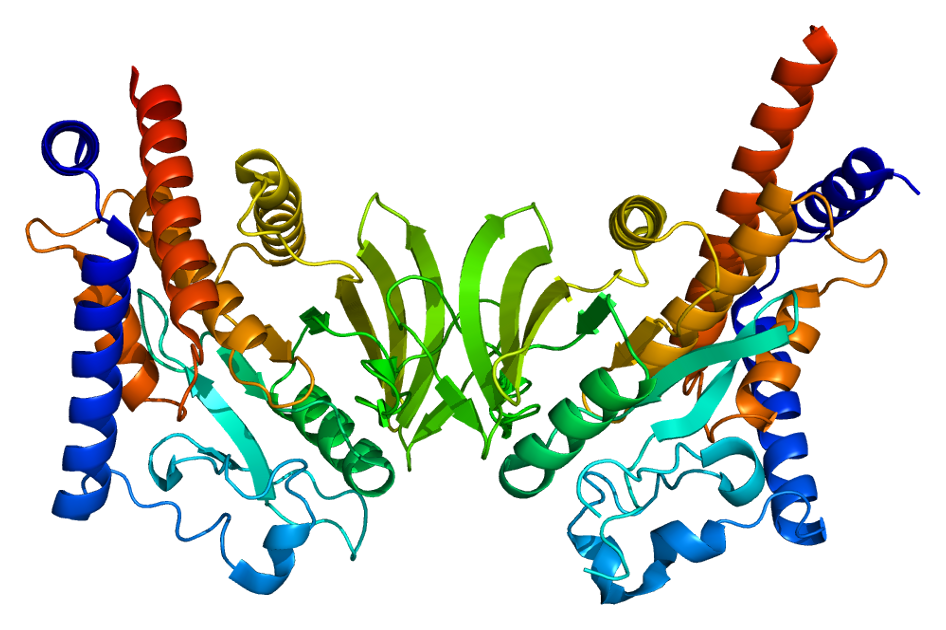
Ribbon diagram of PTPN22

In 1978, she gained the position of assistant professor in immunology at Scripps in California (1978–85), where she remained for the rest of her career, rising to associate professor (1985–97) and professor of immunology and microbial sciences (from 1997). She was the first female full professor at Scripps Research. As of 2024, she is an emeritus professor at Scripps Research, and serves on the advisory boards of the La Jolla Institute for Immunology and the San Diego Biomedical Research Institute.

Her research has focused on immune tolerance and autoimmunity, particularly type 1 diabetes, as well as the immune response to tumors. Sherman wrote in 2014 that she believed many diseases not usually considered immunological in nature would turn out to be curable by immune-based therapies. In particular, she states that one aim of her group's research has been to enhance the ability of T cells to respond to particular self-antigens, in the hope of selectively destroying cancer cells. Much of her work has been in mouse models, including investigating why mice reject transplanted human tissue. One focus of her recent work has been the phosphatase PTPN22, a variant form of which is associated with increased risk of autoimmune disease.

== Awards and societies ==
Sherman was president of the American Association of Immunologists in 2014–15, and served on their council (2009–16), including chairing their Awards Committee (2004–5). She was also deputy editor of the society's journal, Journal of Immunology (2003–9). In 2019, the society elected her as a Distinguished Fellow.

== Personal life ==
In around 1978, Sherman married the immunologist Norman Klinman. They had two sons, as well as two stepchildren from Klinman's previous marriage to Judith Klinman. One of their sons has a developmental disability, and Sherman and Klinman were involved in the San Diego charity, Kids Included Together, which supports such children. Klinman died in 2010 of melanoma, and Sherman later remarried.

== Selected publications ==
Reviews

- William L. Redmond, Linda A. Sherman (2005). Peripheral tolerance of CD8 T lymphocytes. Immunity 22 (3): 275–84 doi:10.1016/j.immuni.2005.01.010
- Linda A. Sherman, Suchismita Chattopadhyay (1993). The molecular basis of allorecognition. Annual Review of Immunology 11: 385–402 doi:10.1146/annurev.iy.11.040193.002125

Research papers

- Rinke Bos, Linda A. Sherman (2010). CD4^{+} T-Cell Help in the Tumor Milieu Is Required for Recruitment and Cytolytic Function of CD8^{+} T Lymphocytes. Cancer Research 70 (21): 8368–77 doi:10.1158/0008-5472.CAN-10-1322
- Matthias Theobald, Judith Biggs, Dirk Dittmer, Arnold J. Levine, Linda A. Sherman (1995). Targeting p53 as a general tumor antigen. Proceedings of the National Academy of Sciences of the United States of America 92 (26): 11993–97 doi:10.1073/pnas.92.26.11993
- Antonella Vitiello, Donata Marchesini, Jillian Furze, Linda A. Sherman, Robert W. Chesnut (1991). Analysis of the HLA-restricted influenza-specific cytotoxic T lymphocyte response in transgenic mice carrying a chimeric human-mouse class I major histocompatibility complex. Journal of Experimental Medicine 173 (4): 1007–15 doi:10.1084/jem.173.4.1007
