= Gail A. Bishop =

Immunologist

- Education: University of Wisconsin–Madison (BSc); University of Michigan (PhD)
- Awards: Elected Fellow of the American Association for the Advancement of Science
- Scientific career
- Workplaces: University of North Carolina at Chapel Hill; University of Iowa

Gail A. Bishop is an American professor of microbiology and immunology at the University of Iowa and director of the Center for Immunology & Immune-Based Diseases at the Carver College of Medicine.

== Early life and education ==
Bishop was born in Wisconsin, United States. She became interested in science as a teenager after first studying biology in the 9th grade. She completed a summer job in a leukemia research laboratory in Milwaukee. Bishop studied biology at St. Olaf College. She earned a master's degree in oncology at the University of Wisconsin–Madison. Bishop moved to University of Michigan as a graduate student, working in cellular biology with Joseph Glorioso. Her doctoral degree involved research into the Herpes simplex virus. After completing her PhD Bishop was appointed as a postdoctoral fellow to the University of North Carolina at Chapel Hill where she worked on the mechanism of B lymphocyte activation and the structure-function relationships within B cell signalling receptors.

== Research and career ==
In 1989 Bishop was appointed as an assistant professor at the University of Iowa. She was promoted to professor in 1998, and in 2001 became the Distinguished Professor of Microbiology.

Bishop studies the molecular mechanisms that underlie lymphocyte regulation and activation by members of the TNF receptor superfamily. She studies lymphocyte signalling and the interaction between immune receptors. Her work involves studying the mechanisms by which the protein-coding gene TRAF3 deficiency regulates survival in B lymphocytes. She has shown that TRAF3 is a regulator of critical negative regulator of homeostatic survival in B lymphocytes. Through this research Bishop hopes to design new treatments for B lymphocyte malignancies.

She has also investigated the role of TRAF3 in T cell signalling and function, as well as trying to establish the nuclear roles of TRAF3. T cells that are deficient in TRAF3 have no clear differences in survival, but do have decreases in CD4+ and CD8+ responses to infection or immunisation. Bishop showed that in T cells TRAF3 associates with the T-cell receptor (TCR) complex, which governs TCR-mediated activation.

Bishop believes that B lymphocytes could be used for immunotherapeutic cancer treatment, whereby B-cells can injected, become activated in vitro and serve as antigen-presenting cells. B cell immunotherapy presents a promising alternative to using dendritic cells.

Alongside her scientific research, Bishop has spoken about the environment for women and other minoritized groups within academic science.

On January 1, 2024, she became the Editor-in-Chief of The Journal of Immunology.

=== Awards and honors ===
Her awards and honors include:

- 2003 University of Iowa Graduate Mentoring Award
- 2007 Elected to the Council of the American Association of Immunologists
- 2009 Iowa Technology Association Woman of Innovation
- 2010 Chair of the National Institutes of Health Tumors, Tolerance and Transplantation study section
- 2012 President of the American Association of Immunologists
- 2019 Elected fellow of the American Association for the Advancement of Science

=== Selected publications ===
Her publications include:

- Bishop, Gail A. (2009-10-01). "CD40 and autoimmunity: the dark side of a great activator". Seminars in Immunology. 21 (5): 293–300. doi:10.1016/j.smim.2009.05.012. PMC 2753170. PMID 19595612.
- Bishop, Gail A. (2003-06-01). "The CD40–CD154 interaction in B cell–T cell liaisons". Cytokine & Growth Factor Reviews. 14 (3–4): 297–309. doi:10.1016/S1359-6101(03)00024-8. PMID 12787567.
- Bishop, Gail A. (2004). "The multifaceted roles of TRAFs in the regulation of B-cell function". Nature Reviews Immunology. 4 (10): 775–786. doi:10.1038/nri1462. PMID 15459669. S2CID 29910164.
