= Kristin Hogquist =

American immunologist

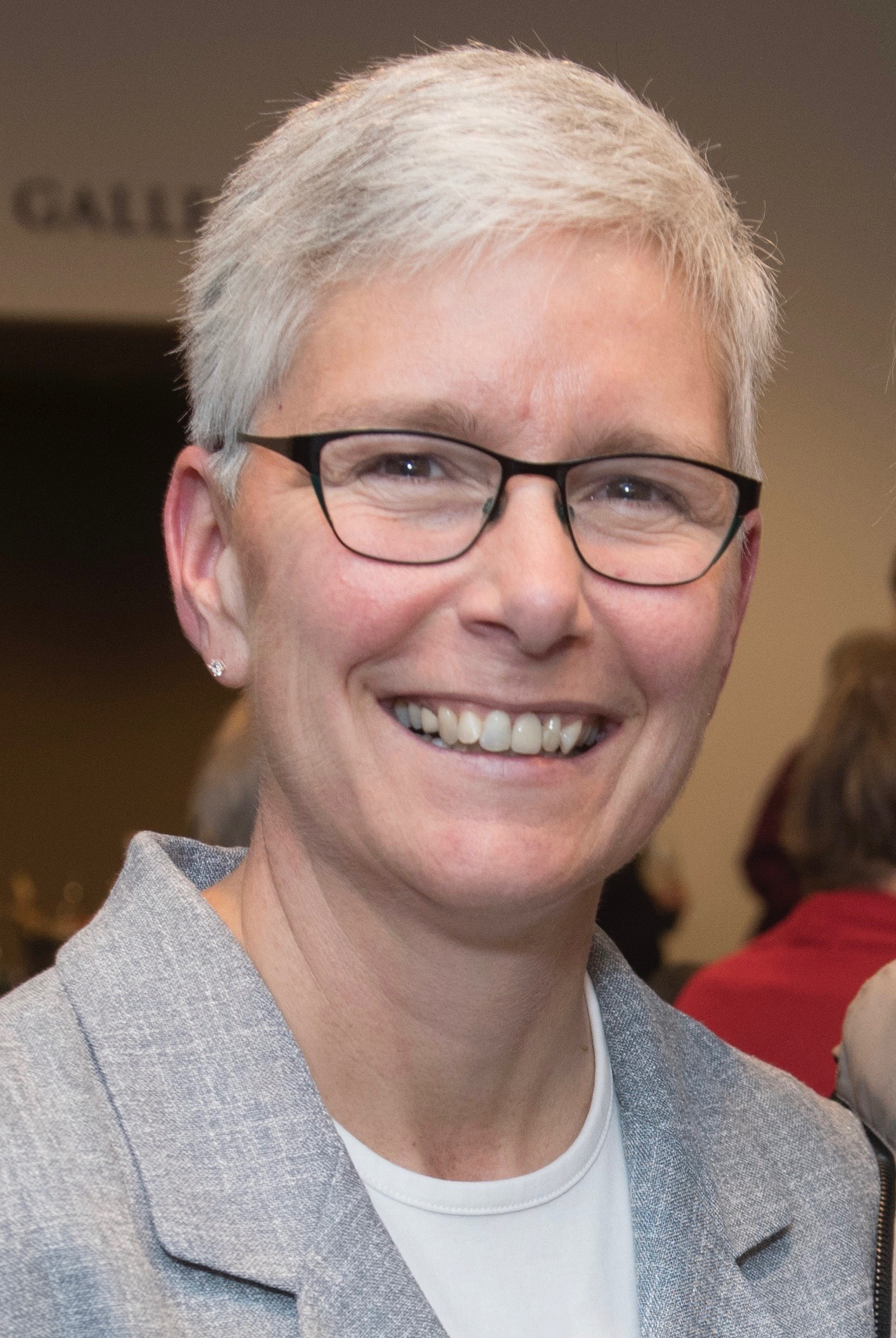
- Born: Minnesota, USA
- Spouse: Stephen C. Jameson

Academic background
- Education: St. Catherine University (BA); Washington University in St. Louis (PhD)

Academic work
- Institutions: University of Minnesota

Kristin Ann Hogquist is an American immunologist. She holds the David M. Brown Endowed Professorship and is Associate Director of the Center for Immunology at the University of Minnesota.

== Early life and education ==
Hogquist was born and raised in Minnesota. While earning her Bachelor of Arts degree at St. Catherine University, Hogquist was a member of Phi Beta Kappa and recipient of the Tozer Scholarship. After graduating in 1983, she earned the National Science Foundation Fellowship and completed her PhD from Washington University in St. Louis.

== Career ==
Upon completing her education, Hogquist joined the faculty at the University of Minnesota (UMN) as an assistant professor in 1995. During her tenure at UMN, Hogquist focused on T cell development in the thymus, particularly positive and negative selection, tolerance, and T cell selection in immune homeostasis and response. Her research laboratory identified the first naturally occurring self-peptides involved in the positive selection of T cells and studied their affinities for the T-cell receptor when bound to MHC, providing evidence for an affinity model of thymic selection. In 2009, Hogquist was appointed to the David M. Brown Endowed Professorship position.

Hogquist chaired the AAI Program Committee from 2009 until 2012, where she subsequently received the American Association of Immunologists Distinguished Service Award for her outstanding service to the immunology community. She served on the Editorial Board of the Journal of Immunology, Annual Reviews of Immunology, Proceedings of the National Academy of Sciences, and Immunity. Hogquist was inducted into the AHC Academy of Excellence in Health Research and honored at the 2016 Dean's Distinguished Research Lecture. In 2018, Hogquist was named Laboratory Medicine and Pathology Vice Chair for Research and later elected a Distinguished Fellow of the American Association of Immunologists. In 2022, she was elected to the National Academy of Sciences.
