= Kellogg School =

Kellogg School may refer to:

- Kellogg School of Management at Northwestern University
- Kellogg School of Science and Technology at The Scripps Research Institute
- Kellogg College, Oxford, one of the constituent colleges of Oxford University
- Kellogg Community College campuses in southwest Michigan
- Kellogg Middle School, a school in the Shoreline School District
- Kellogg School, a school in Goleta Union School District
- The Hyde, a neighborhood in Wichita, Kansas
