= Harvey Cantor =

American immunologist

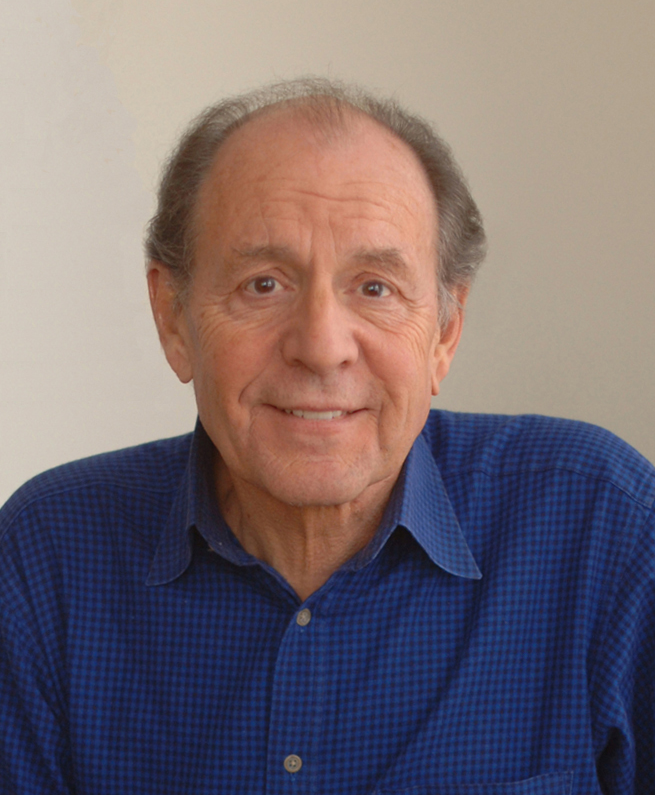
- Harvey Cantor
- Education: Columbia University; NYU School of Medicine
- Known for: T cell subsets
- Scientific career
- Fields: Immunology
- Workplaces: Harvard Medical School; Dana–Farber Cancer Institute

Harvey Cantor is an American immunologist known for his studies of the development and immunological function of T lymphocytes. Cantor is currently the Baruj Benacerraf Professor of Immunology and Microbiology at the Harvard Medical School.

== Research ==
Cantor's early studies focused on the development and function of lymphocytes derived from the thymus (T-lymphocytes or T cells). In particular, his research addressed whether the multiple immunological functions of T cells were invested in a single lineage or represented the specialized activities of distinct T cell subsets. This approach depended on the use of antibodies to cell surface glycoproteins or “markers” that might identify specialized subsets of lymphocytes with particular immunologic functions. This experimental approach was also used to investigate other lymphocyte populations, including “natural killer” cells. His laboratory continues to investigate the molecular and cellular elements that regulate the immune response and maintain self-tolerance in the context of autoimmune disorders, anti-tumor immunity and, more recently, Alzheimer's disease.

== Education ==
Cantor received an A.B. from Columbia University and M.D. from New York University School of Medicine, followed by fellowship training at the National Institutes of Health (NIH) in Bethesda, MD with Richard Asofsky and as an NIH Special Fellow at the National Institute for Medical Research in Mill Hill, London. Following a residency in medicine at Stanford, he joined the faculty of Harvard Medical School in 1975 as an assistant professor of medicine and, since 1979, has been professor of pathology. In 1998, Cantor was appointed chair of the Department of Cancer Immunology & Virology at the Dana-Farber Cancer Institute and in 2007 he was honored by appointment to the Baruj Benacerraf Professorship at Harvard Medical School.

== Awards ==
Cantor was elected to the National Academy of Sciences (2002), the American Association for the Advancement of Science (2005) and the American Academy of Arts & Sciences (2010). More recently, Cantor received the 2019 Excellence in Mentoring Award and was elected as a Distinguished Fellow of the American Association of Immunologists in 2020.
