= 1902 cholera outbreak of the Philippines =

Disease outbreak in the Philippines

The 1902 cholera outbreak of the Philippines began in Manila in March 1902 and the first wave ended in February 1903. This was followed by a second wave from May 1903 to April 1904. Cholera, a disease familiar to both Filipinos and American medical officers, spread throughout the archipelago during the aftermath of the Philippine–American War. The cholera epidemic reappeared again in 1908.

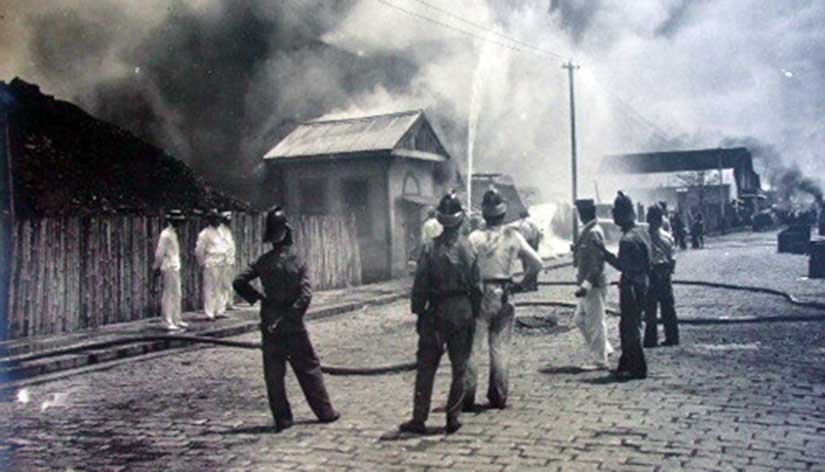
Burning of lighthouse infected with cholera at Tondo district, Manila (c. 1902)

== Epidemic ==
=== First cases ===
On March 3, 1902, the Insular Government at Manila was notified of an "Asiatic cholera" found in Canton, China. On March 8, the spread of the disease reached Hongkong. On March 20, the board of health which consists of U.S. Army medical officers, was notified that two patients at the San Juan de Dios Hospital was showing symptoms of this Asiatic cholera.

Due to the worrying cases of the patients, Lieutenant General Adna Romanza Chaffee, Military Governor of the Philippines at the time, conducted an armed patrol near the Marikina River. Chaffee shared information that the Marikina River could pose "danger" to the inhabitants living there, especially to the estimated 14,000 inhabitants in Montalban. He informed that the water from the river are used for drinking, bathing, and other domestic uses. Due to the pollution of the river, infection soon broke out in the Marikina Valley.

=== Spread ===
Cholera infections occur when contaminated water is consumed, often due to "fecal matter". This was the case of worries on contaminated bodies of waters by American officials. An alleged outbreak in the Philippines were also suspected to began when locals consumed cabbage washed ashore from an infected Chinese trading ship. Although the origin is contested, Charles E. Woodruff, a U.S. Army surgeon noted that uncooked vegetables can harbor bacteria from infectious diseases, contributing to their spread when eaten.

The aftermath of the war with Filipino revolutionaries further exacerbate the spread of cholera. As the number of infections grew in Manila, the disease began to spread in other Philippine provinces.

#	Province	Date
Reported first appearance of Asiatic cholera in Filipino provinces
Luzon
1	Bulacan	March 23, 1902
2	Cavite	March 27, 1902
3	Bataan	March 28, 1902
4	Ambos Camarines	April 2, 1902
5	Rizal	April 2, 1902
6	Laguna	April 7, 1902
7	Pampanga	April 13, 1902
8	Pangasinan	April 24, 1902
9	Tarlac	April 28, 1902
10	Nueva Ecija	May 8, 1902
11	Batangas	May 24, 1902
12	Mindoro	June 10, 1902
13	Tayabas	June 13, 1902
14	Zambales	July 1, 1902
15	Marinduque	July 1, 1902
16	Benguet	July 4, 1902
17	Sorsogon	October 15, 1902
18	Romblon	October 30, 1902
Visayas
19	Leyte	May 9, 1902
20	Samar	May 29, 1902
21	Cebu	July 14, 1902
22	Western Negros	August 26, 1902
23	Iloilo	August 28, 1902
24	Capiz	September 8, 1902
25	Eastern Negros	September 29, 1902
26	Antique	October 2, 1902
Mindanao
27	Surigao	September 5, 1902
28	Misamis	October 2, 1902

== Response ==
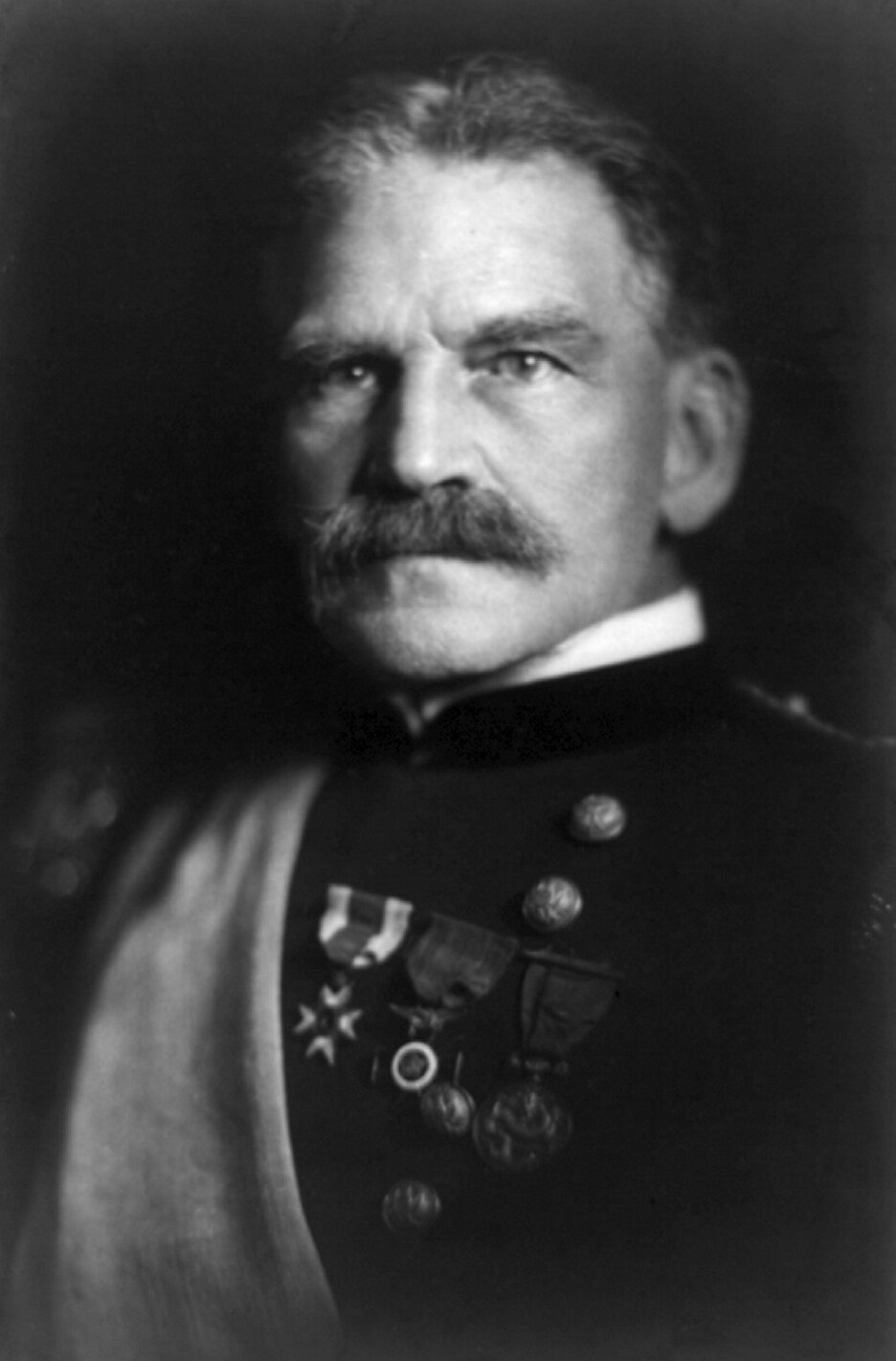
Philippine Military Governor, Adna R. Chaffee

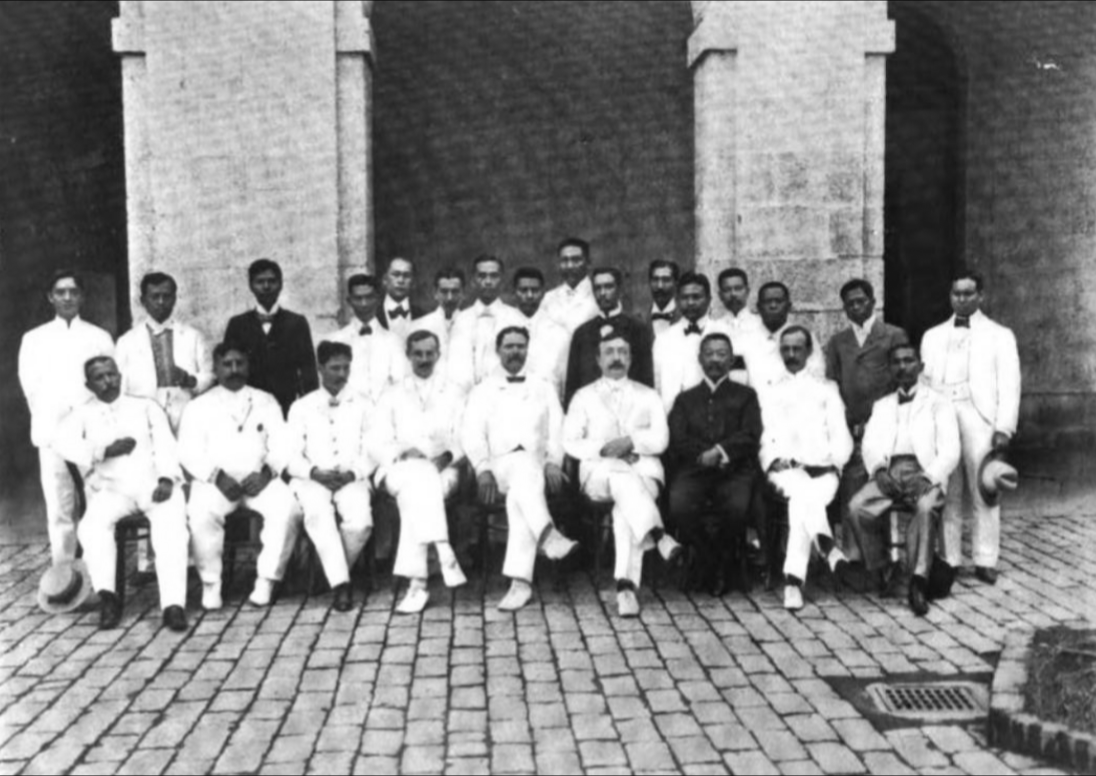
Board of Health for the Philippine Islands and Presidents of Provincial Boards of Health at the time of the 1902 cholera outbreak

Under Chaffee, certain measures were taken to combat a cholera outbreak in Manila. It was divided into sanitary districts, and medical officers were assigned to each. The sale of certain foods was prohibited, and strict inspections of markets and restaurants were implemented. Cholera cases were isolated in hospitals, and contacts were detained. Cholera houses were quarantined and disinfected. Autopsies were performed to confirm cholera cases and avoid unnecessary detention. It was conducted by American doctors such as Richard P. Strong, James Wesley Jobling, J. B. Thomas, and assisted by Norman Williams. Bodies of cholera victims were cremated if not claimed within twenty-four hours.

In the provinces, some American army medical officers observed the lack of competency among Filipino physicians in handling and control of the disease. According to J. C. Perry, Surgeon General and Chief Quarantine Officer in the Philippines:

The provincial and municipal boards of health, composed of Filipino physicians, have proved to be entirely incompetent to meet the emergency of dealing with an epidemic...

— J.C. Perry, Reports from Manila-Cholera in the islands (1902)

Perry further added that most of the disease control of cholera were done by U.S. army surgeons.

To prevent infectious diseases entering the islands, American authorities would check if a watercraft such as boats or ships are permissible to land. Since the Americans were preoccupied before the epidemic during the Philippine-American War, they failed to enforce the necessary precautional procedures throughout the islands. Additionally, Filipinos are banca drivers who knew the local geographical locations of beaches, some of them even avoided docks guarded by authorities. There were also the threat of smugglers who would try to bypass precautionary measures before landing.

In Manila, Chaffee was disappointed by the opposition from Filipinos and Spanish physicians. Although they agreed to provide the board of health assistance, they neglected to report them the number of cholera cases while some resort to falsification. Although, there were some exceptions such as Manuel Gomez, who provided immense work on investigating cholera cases in the islands, and Luis Arbella, a medical inspector.

== Medical treatment ==
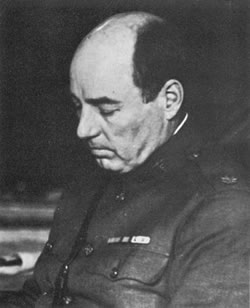
Richard P. Strong, American army surgeon and doctor

U. S. Army surgeons began conducting research for prevention and treatment of cholera in the islands. Richard P. Strong tried to develop a cholera vaccine for civilian capacity. Questions aroused regarding its safety and Strong admitted that it might take years to produce a strain of the suffieciently weakened organism suitable for safe use.

In 1903, Japan created a vaccine solely for the prevention of cholera and an antitoxin for its treatment. As tests were given, the U.S. Army was impressed but the vaccines were not for sale and unobtainable.

In Manila, a medical officer informed George Miller Sternberg, an American army surgeon, that he was using a normal salt solution to the vein. According to the officer, the solution "in collapse, gave the most gratifying results". Attempts at curing cholera became successful using a saline solution to be injected under the skin through the veins.

== Casualties ==
After the first wave epidemic in 1903, official records from the board of health made a total of 103,076 reported cases and 66,387 deaths in the provinces. In Manila, there are 4,174 cases and 3,146 deaths. Most of the cases and deaths occurred were underreported by Filipino physicians due to cultural taboos and fear of property loss from American authorities. J.C. Perry commented in August 1902:

They [Filipinos] will adopt every measure to conceal the cases and throw every obstacle in the way of the authorities in their attempt to suppress the disease.

— J.C. Perry, Philippine Islands. Reports from Manila-Cholera in the islands (1902)

American authorities further requested the cremation of infected bodies but was met with opposition from Filipinos and Spanish residents. During the epidemic, there had been a growing anti-American sentiment among residents resulting in civil disobedience. Some believed that the cholera outbreak was a "hoax" and others propagated that Americans intentionally put poisonous powders on wells to kill unsuspecting villagers. By May 1903, the second wave of the epidemic commenced and cholera cases increased. On March 8, 1904, it increased to 166,252 reported cases resulting in 109,461 deaths.

From March 8, 1904, to August 23, 1905, there were no reported cases in cholera. On April 27, 1904, the epidemic was declared to have ended. Another cholera epidemic occurred in 1908. It was treated using intravenous injections in hospitals, despite sporadic Filipino rebellions until 1911.

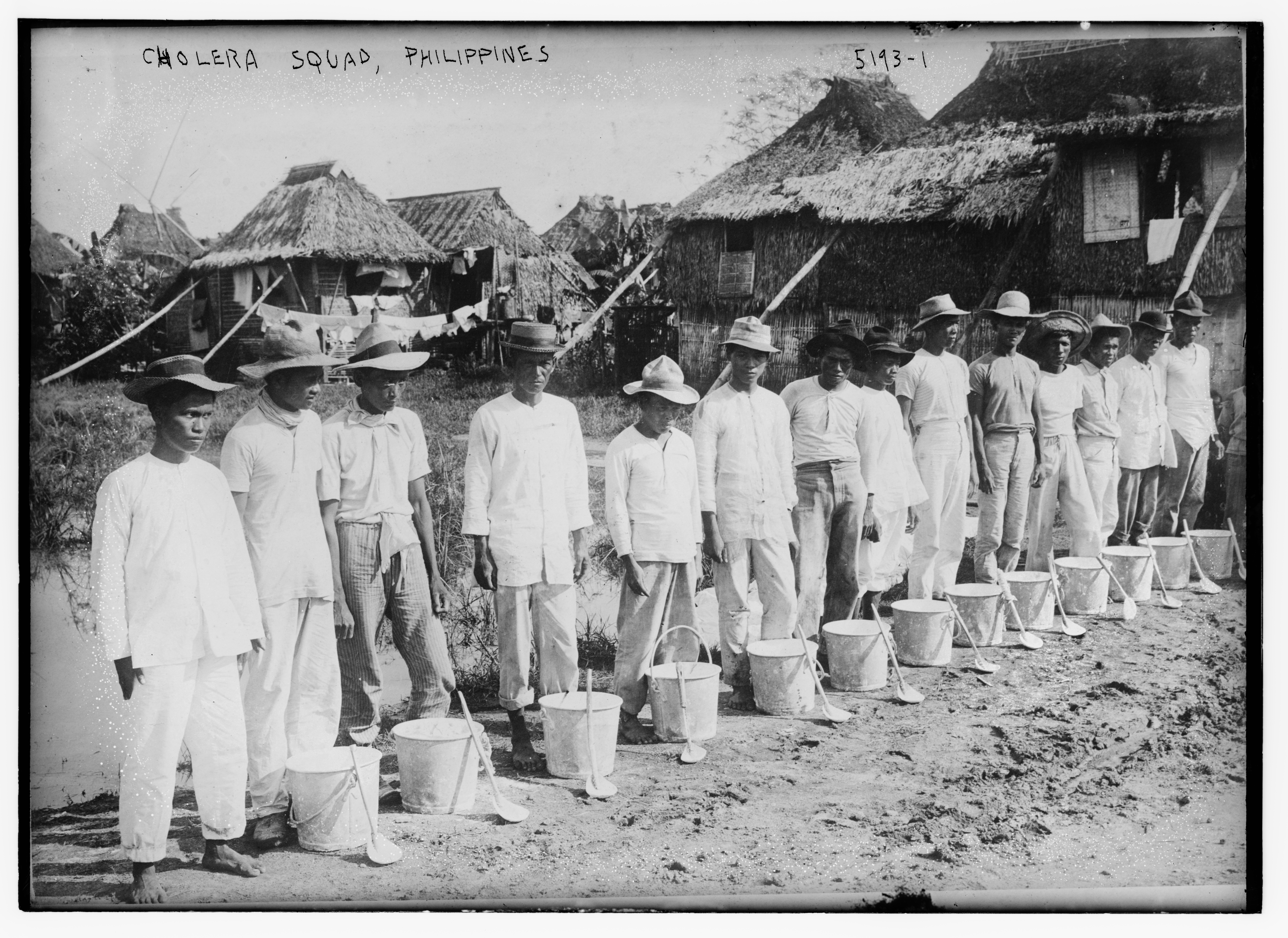
Cholera Squad in the Philippines (c. 1915)

The Tropical Disease Board and American army surgeons made additional campaigns to suppress the infection in the islands. Although historian Ken de Bevoise acknowledges the lack of education and poverty of Filipinos as the cause of spread, it was also acknowledged that reconcentration policies by American authorities made the infection easier. The knowledge of Americans that Filipinos were uneducated and poor added complications in handling the disease.
