= Max Dale Cooper =

American immunologist

Max Dale Cooper ForMemRS
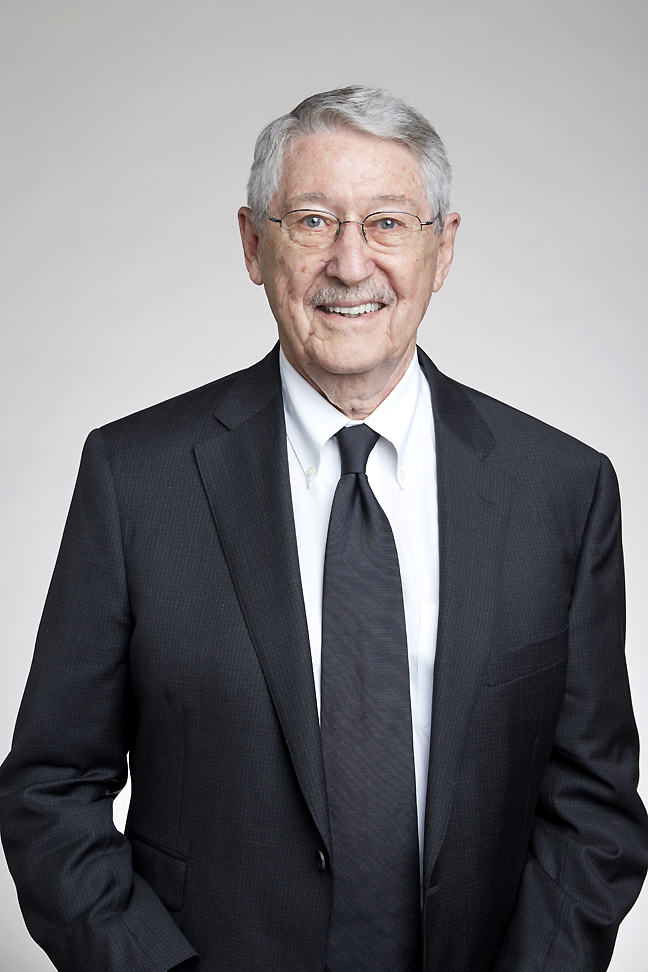
- Max Cooper at the Royal Society admissions day in London, July 2017
- Born: Max Dale Cooper; August 28, 1933 (age 93); Hazlehurst, Mississippi
- Education: Tulane University; University of Mississippi; Holmes Junior College
- Known for: T cell and B cell biology
- Spouse: Rosalie Cooper
- Awards: Albert Lasker Award for Basic Medical Research; Japan Prize; Robert Koch Award; Sandoz Prize for Immunology
- Scientific career
- Workplaces: Emory University; University of Alabama at Birmingham; Howard Hughes Medical Institute; University of Minnesota; University of California, San Francisco; Hospital for Sick Children, London

Max Dale Cooper ForMemRS (born August 31, 1933), is an American immunologist and a professor at the Department of Pathology and Laboratory Medicine and the Emory Vaccine Center of Emory University School of Medicine. He is known for characterizing T cells and B cells.

== Early life and education ==
Cooper was born and raised in rural Mississippi. His father was the Superintendent of Education of a 12-grade school in Bentonia and his mother a teacher. He lived with his family on the campus. He was interested in becoming a physician at a young age, and his father, who wanted to study medicine but could not due to financial reasons, encouraged him to do so. Cooper went to Holmes Junior College (now Holmes Community College) on an American football scholarship from 1951 to 1952, then entered the University of Mississippi for pre-medical studies.

In 1954, Cooper started studying medicine at the University of Mississippi School of Medicine. Since the school at that time was a two-year medical school and was becoming a four-year one, Cooper was offered the option of staying or transferring elsewhere. He chose to move to the Tulane University School of Medicine, and obtained his MD in 1957.

== Career ==
After graduating from medical school, Cooper interned at a hospital in Saginaw, Michigan for a year, and then returned to Tulane University School of Medicine for a residency. In 1960, Cooper went to Hospital for Sick Children, London as pre-registration house officer and then research assistant until 1961. From 1961 to 1962, he was a pediatric allergy and immunology fellow at the University of California, San Francisco.

Cooper briefly returned to Tulane as an instructor, then moved to the Department of Pediatrics at the University of Minnesota in 1963 to as a medical fellow and instructor, working with Robert A. Good and conducting research. He became an assistant professor in 1966.

One year later he joined the University of Alabama at Birmingham (UAB) as a professor at the Division of Immunology and Allergy of the Department of Pediatrics and an associate professor at the Department of Microbiology. Over the next few years, Cooper also became a professor at the Department of Microbiology, of Pathology and of Medicine. During this period, he was also involved with the Comprehensive Cancer Center (since 1971), the Multipurpose Arthritis Center (since 1979), and the Cystic Fibrosis Research Center (since 1981), all at UAB, and was an investigator at the Howard Hughes Medical Institute between 1988 and 2006.

In 2008, convinced by the Georgia Research Alliance, where Emory University is a partner institution, Cooper moved to the Department of Pathology and Laboratory Medicine at the School of Medicine of Emory University in Georgia, US. He is also a professor at the Winship Cancer Institute and the Emory Vaccine Center, and an Eminent Scholar at the Georgia Research Alliance. Cooper remains a Professor Emeritus of Medicine at UAB.

Cooper was the president of the American Association of Immunologists between 1988 and 1989 and a member of their Council from 1983 to 1988.

== Research ==
Cooper's research focus is the adaptive immune system, particularly T cells and B cells. Following Jacques Miller's discovery in 1961 of the immunological role of the thymus, the scientific community believed that there is only one lineage of lymphocytes (the T cells), that produced by the thymus. As a pediatrician, Cooper was studying patients of the Wiskott–Aldrich syndrome, who have few lymphocytes but high levels of plasma cells and antibodies, which were thought to derive from T cells.

Inspired by a report that the bursa of Fabricius (or the bursa) in chickens may be responsible for producing antibodies, he conducted experiments in 1964 on chickens to determine the roles of the thymus and the bushra. He removed the thymus or the bursa from chicks and irradiated them with X-ray to kill lymphocytes that may have been produced earlier by the thymus and bursa.

The experiments showed irradiated chicks with the bursa removed did not have plasma cells, antibodies, and germinal centers, despite their intact thymus. Conversely, irradiated chickens with the thymus removed had low lymphocyte levels, but had normal antibodies, plasma cells, and germinal centers. The lymphocytes produced by the bursa are known as B cells.

Again working on chickens, Cooper also made a contribution to deducing how B cells produce different types of antibodies at different stages of embryonic development, in the sequence of IgM, IgG, and IgA. His experiments indicated a single lineage of B cells switch from IgM to producing other immunoglobulin isotypes, as opposed to multiple B cell subtypes each producing one immunoglobulin isotype. This process is known as immunoglobulin class switching.

Collaborating with John Owen from the UK, Cooper used a series of experiments to determine the mammalian organ equivalent to the bursa and found that B cells are produced in the liver of fetal mice. Together with independent reports by Pierre Vassalli and Gustav Nossal in 1974 that B cells were produced in the bone marrow of fetal mice, these discoveries show haematopoietic tissues generate B cells in mammals.

More recently, Cooper studied the adaptive immune system in jawless vertebrates, including lampreys and hagfish. Working with Jan Klein, he confirmed these animals have cells functionally similar to mammalian T cells and B cells. Cooper's group also found that instead of antibodies, lampreys have a family of immune receptors. They named it variable lymphocyte receptor. Owing to the unique specificity of these antibody-counterparts and their distinction from human antibodies, they may be used in treating various types of cancer such as multiple myeloma and brain cancer.

External videos
- Seminar by Max Cooper about immune cells in jawless vertebrates after an introduction about his career.

== Awards and honors ==
- Member of the American Society for Clinical Investigation (1972)
- President's Medal, University of Alabama at Birmingham (1988)
- Member of the National Academy of Sciences (1988)
- Sandoz Prize for Immunology (1990)
- Member of the Alabama Academy of Honor (1990)
- Member of the National Academy of Medicine (1990)
- Member of the American Academy of Arts and Sciences (1992)
- Fellow of the American Association for the Advancement of Science (1994)
- American Association of Immunologists Lifetime Achievement Award (2000)
- Robert Koch Award (2010)
- Foreign Associate of the French Academy of Sciences (2015)
- Foreign Member of the Royal Society (2017)
- Japan Prize (2018)
- Distinguished Fellow of American Association of Immunologists (2019)
- Albert Lasker Award for Basic Medical Research (2019)
- Honorary Doctor of Medical Sciences from Yale University (2023)
