= Jenny P. Y. Ting =

Taiwanese-American immunologist and microbiologist

- Born: Taiwan
- Citizenship: American
- Education: Illinois State University; Northwestern University
- Scientific career
- Workplaces: University of North Carolina

Jenny Pan-Yun Ting is a Chinese-American immunologist and microbiologist at University of North Carolina. She is a highly cited researcher who studies the role of NLR genes in regulating inflammation and how nanoparticles and microparticles can be used as vaccine adjuvants. She was president of the American Association of Immunologists from 2020 to 2021.

== Early life and education ==
Jenny Pan-Yun Ting was born in Taiwan. She immigrated to the US after receiving a foreign student scholarship from Illinois State University. She graduated in 1975 with a bachelor's degree in medical technology. She then attended Northwestern University for her PhD before completing post-doctoral research appointments at University of Southern California and Duke University.

== Career ==
In 1984 Ting was hired as an assistant professor at the University of North Carolina. She was promoted to associate professor in 1990 and full professor in 1993. She received a named professorship in 2009, becoming the William Rand Kenan Professor. Since 1991 she has been leader of the immunology program at UNC Lineberger Comprehensive Cancer Center. She has been director of its Center for Translational Immunology and co-director of its Institute of Inflammatory Diseases since 2008. Ting's research areas include the NLR gene family, which act as regulators of inflammation. She also researches vaccine adjuvants, including the possible use of nanoparticles and microparticles, for cancers that are difficult to treat like triple-negative breast cancer or for infectious diseases like dengue fever or zika fever.

She has served on the editorial boards of several journals, including the Journal of Immunology, Molecular and Cellular Biology, and the Annual Review of Immunology. At University of North Carolina at Chapel Hill, her lab was among the first to define the human NLR (NOD-like receptor) gene family, describing multiple previously unrecognized NLR genes (including 16 new ones).

== Awards and honors ==
Ting was elected to the Henry Kunkel Society and the Academia Sinica in 2015. In 2015 and 2016 she was a Thomas Reuter Highly Cited Researcher; in 2018 and 2019 she was a Clarivate/Analytics Highly Cited Researcher. She was vice president of the American Association of Immunologists from 2019 to 2020 and named the president for 2020 to 2021. She was the first woman of color to serve as the organization's president.

In 2010, she was inducted into the Illinois State University College of Applied Science and Technology Hall of Fame. Her National Cancer Institute (NCI) Outstanding Investigator Award supports her work for the 2019-2026 period. In 2021, she received the International Cytokine and Interferon Society’s ICIS-Pfizer Award, recognizing her contributions to cytokine/interferon research.In 2022, she was elected as a member of the National Academy of Sciences and the American Academy of Arts and Sciences.
