= Michael S. Krangel =

American immunologist

Academic background
- Education: Ph.D., 1982, Harvard University
- Thesis: Structural variants in the analysis of HLA

Academic work
- Institutions: Duke University School of Medicine

Michael Steven Krangel is an American immunologist. He is the Mary Bernheim Distinguished Professor of Immunology in the Department of Immunology at the Duke University School of Medicine. In 2010, Krangel was appointed chair of the Department of Immunology at Duke University School of Medicine.

Krangel served as the first co-Editor-in-Chief of ImmunoHorizons with Leslie J. Berg from 2017 to 2019.
