= Manfred M. Mayer =

German-born, American microbiologist and immunologist

Manfred Martin Mayer (15 June 1916, Frankfurt am Main – 18 September 1984, Baltimore) was a German-born, American microbiologist and immunologist. He is considered the founder of complement research.

== Biography ==
Manfred M. Mayer attended elementary school and secondary school in Germany. Mayer's family fled to the United States in December 1933 because of political events. He graduated from City College of New York in 1938 with a bachelor's degree and from Columbia University in 1946 with a PhD under the supervision Michael Heidelberger with a dissertation on the chemistry and immunology of phosphorylated serum albumin. Mayer published several papers on precipitin reactions and the cross-reactivity of various polysaccharides in the envelope of Streptococcus pneumoniae . Mayer, with Elvin A. Kabat, published the textbook Experimental Immunochemistry , which between 1948 and 1984 had two editions and seven reprints.

At Johns Hopkins University School of Medicine, Mayer became in 1946 an assistant professor, in 1948 an associate professor, and 1960 a full professor. At Johns Hopkins University, he elucidated the sequence of 18 enzyme reactions of the complement system, demonstrated calcium and magnesium as cofactors of the complement system, and described how lysis is accomplished by the complement system, which inserts a pore into the cell wall of the target cell. Further work by Mayer concerned malaria and the purification of poliovirus. Robert Armstrong Nelson and Mayer developed the eponymous Nelson-Mayer test, which enables diagnosis of syphilis based on the demonstration of immobilizing antibodies that occur in the patient's serum. The test greatly reduces false-positive diagnoses of syphilis. Nelson and Mayer also developed Nelson-Mayer basal medium for growing Treponema pallidum bacteria in vitro.

He and his wife Elinor S. Mayer (1921–2007) were married in 1943 and had four sons. Manfred Mayer's students include Teruko Ishizaka.

== Awards and honors ==
- 1953 — Kimble Award for Methodology
- 1957 — Selman Waksman Lectureship Award
- 1969 — Honorary Doctor of Medical Science, Johannes Gutenberg University, Mainz, Germany
- 1974 — Karl Landsteiner Memorial Award, American Association of Blood Banks
- 1976 — Albion O. Bernstein Award, Medical Society of the State of New York
- 1976/1977 — President of the American Association of Immunologists
- 1979 — Member of the United States National Academy of Sciences
- 1982 — Gairdner Foundation International Award, Toronto, Canada
