= Henry Metzger =

American immunologist (1932–2018)

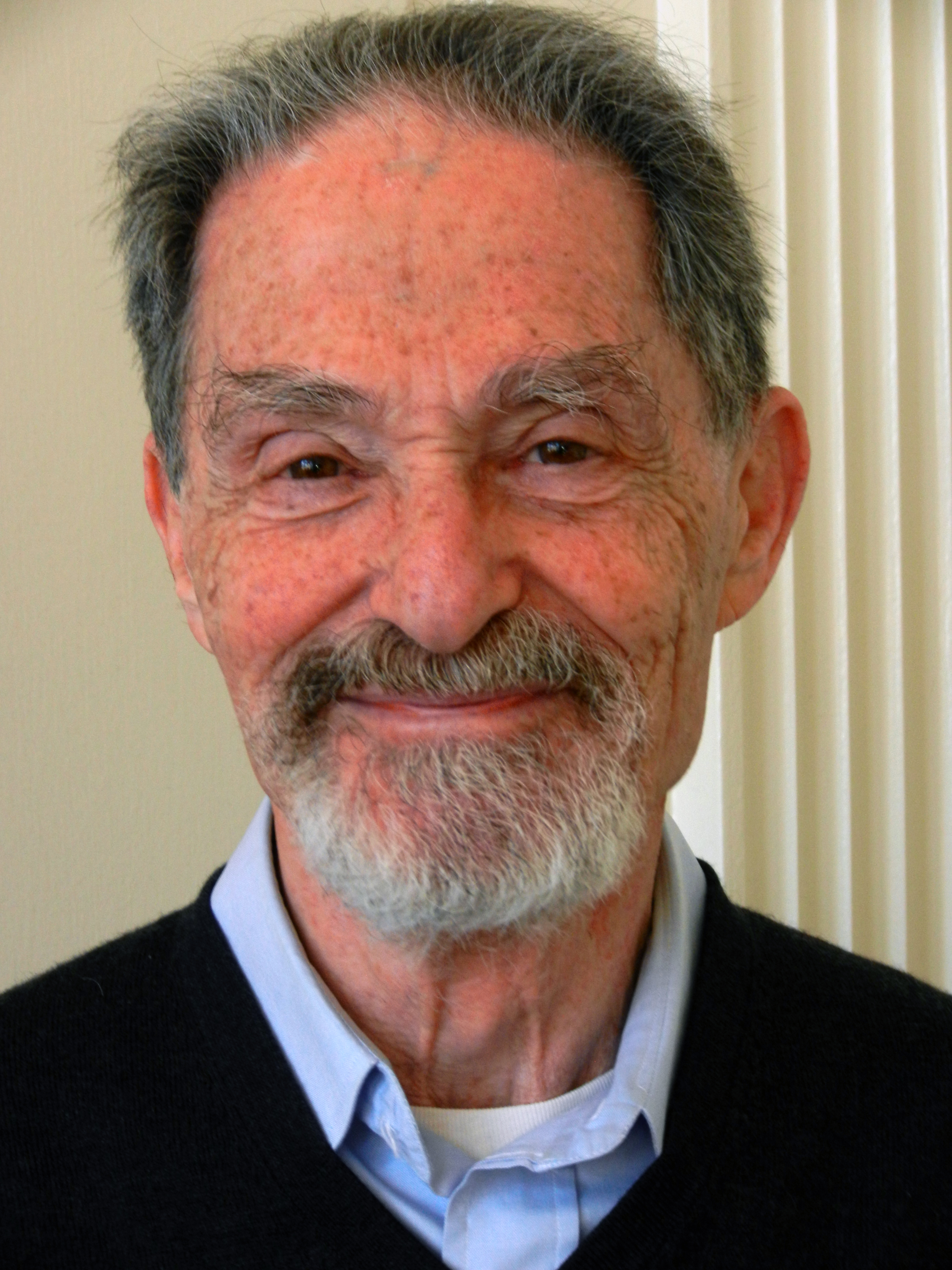
Henry Metzger in 2013

Henry Peter Metzger (March 23, 1932 – November 20, 2018) was an American immunologist.

Metzger was born to a Jewish family in Mainz on March 23, 1932, to a hardware store owner and a homemaker. Some of his relatives were murdered in the Holocaust. At the suggestion of his sisters, Metzger's father moved to the United States in 1937, followed by his wife and sons in January 1938. Henry Metzger attended the Bronx High School of Science, as did his brother, then earned a bachelor's degree from the University of Rochester in 1953, followed by a medical degree at the Columbia University College of Physicians and Surgeons in 1957. Metzger completed his residency at Columbia Presbyterian Hospital, and joined the Public Health Service in 1959, through which he began working at the National Institutes of Health. After two years of post-doctoral study with Seymour Jonathan Singer, funded partly by the Helen Hay Whitney Fellowship, Metzger returned to the National Institutes of Health, working primarily in the National Institute of Arthritis and Musculoskeletal and Skin Diseases.

The American Association of Immunologists awarded Metzger its Distinguished Service Award in 1986, the same year he began serving on the AAI Council. He was president of the AAI from 1991 to 1992, and stepped down from the association's executive council in 1993. Six years later, Metzger received the American Association of Immunologists Lifetime Achievement Award, the AAI's highest honor. This followed Metzger's 1992 induction as a member of the National Academy of Sciences and his election as fellow of the American Association for the Advancement of Science. Metzger died in Hanover, New Hampshire, on November 20, 2018, aged 86.
