= Gerald Bertram Webb =

American physician

- Born: September 24, 1871; Cheltenham, England
- Died: January 27, 1948 (aged 76); Colorado Springs, Colorado, U.S.
- Education: University of Denver
- Scientific career
- Fields: Immunology

Gerald Bertram Webb (September 24, 1871–January 27, 1948) was an English-born American physician who became the first president of the American Association of Immunologists, as well as president of the American Clinical and Climatological Association, National Tuberculosis Association, and Association of American Physicians.

== Early life and education ==
Webb was a native of Cheltenham in Gloucestershire. After three years of study at Guy's Hospital in London, he came to the United States in 1893. He and his American-born wife settled in Denver, in the hope that the mountain air would prove beneficial to the tuberculosis with which she had been diagnosed. They remained in Denver for several years, with Webb receiving his M.D. degree from the University of Denver in 1896 and subsequently working in private practice.

== Tuberculosis research ==
Webb's wife finally succumbed to her tuberculosis, dying in 1903, and he himself suffered a near-fatal bout of sepsis leading him to return to Europe to further his medical education. He spent two years pursuing postgraduate work, first in Vienna and later in London. In the latter, he worked in the laboratory of the pioneering British immunologist Almroth Wright. When he returned to the United States in 1907, he opened a specialized practice limited to the research and treatment of tuberculosis.

Webb spent more than forty years working against tuberculosis. At first, he believed that inoculation with virulent tuberculosis was the only path towards immunity, but a long series of inoculation experiments convinced him of the impracticality of this approach. He then moved towards other methods, researching the effects of altitude on the blood of tuberculosis sufferers and refining existing methods of pneumothorax treatment. During World War I, he volunteered for service with the U.S. Army Medical Corps; he helped to organize the military's tuberculosis screening program, and was appointed one of the tuberculosis consultants for the American Expeditionary Forces. During the war, he spent much of his time in France, performing clinical examinations as well as lectures and other educational programs. After the war's end, he designated several hospitals for the treatment of TB-infected soldiers returning to America. In 1924, Webb founded the Colorado Foundation for Research in Tuberculosis, which was renamed in his honor following his death.

== Marriages and family ==
Webb married twice, both times to Americans. His first wife, Jenny Raphael Kenny, died in 1903 after suffering several years of tuberculosis. He remarried in 1904 to Varina Hayes, a granddaughter of Confederate president Jefferson Davis and his second wife Varina. He and his second wife had five children: Varina Margaret Webb, Frances Robine Webb, Eleanor Leila Constance Webb, Joel Addison Hayes Webb, and Gerald Bertram Webb Jr. (who died before his father, in 1947). His second wife predeceased him as well, leaving him her interest in Brierfield Plantation. Webb died of a heart attack at his home in Colorado Springs on January 27, 1948.

== See also ==
- Tuberculosis treatment in Colorado Springs
