= Henry Sherwood Lawrence =

American immunologist (1916–2004)

Dr. Henry Sherwood Lawrence
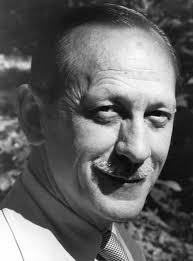
- Born: Henry Sherwood Lawrence; September 22, 1916; New York
- Died: April 5, 2004 (aged 87)
- Occupation: Immunologist

Henry Sherwood Lawrence (September 22, 1916 – April 5, 2004) was an American immunologist best known for his discovery of transfer factors in 1949. He is also known for being one of founders of the new branch of biology that explores the function of lymphocytes. Lawrence was the head of the department of infectious diseases and immunology at New York University, co-director of medical services at Bellevue and New York University Hospitals, a member of the National Academy of Sciences, director of New York University's cancer center, the founding editor of the journal Cellular Immunology, director of New York University's AIDS research center. The New York Times called Lawrence "a pioneering immunologist", "an expert in infectious diseases" and said that "his research generated other advances in immunology". The National Academy of Sciences called him "a distinguished physician, a master teacher, and a pioneer in research on cell-mediated immunity".

== Notable awards and distinctions ==
- The "von Pirquet Gold Medal for Scientific Advancement in Immunology from the Forum on Allergy".
- The "New York Academy of Medicine Medal for Outstanding Contributions to Science".
- The "American College of Physicians Award for Outstanding Contributions to Science".
- The "Lila Gruber Award for Cancer Research from the American Academy of Dermatology".
- The "Distinguished Teacher’s Award from the New York University School of Medicine".

== Chronology ==
- 1916: Born in Astoria, Queens, New York City on May 22.
- 1938: Graduated from New York University.
- 1943: M.D., New York University.
- 1949: Joined the medical faculty of New York University.
- 1959–2000: Became "Head of Infectious Diseases and Immunology", New York University.
- 1964–2000: Named "Co-director of Medical Services" at Bellevue and New York University Hospitals.
- 1979: Assumed the "Jeffrey Bergstein Professorship" of Medicine at New York University.
- 2000: Retires.
