= Jacques Miller =

French-Australian research scientist

Jacques Miller AC FRS FAA
- Born: Jacques Francis Albert Pierre Meunier; 2 April 1931 (age 95); Nice, France
- Citizenship: Australia
- Education: The University of Sydney
- Known for: Discoveries of the function of the thymus and the T cell and B cell subsets of mammalian lymphocytes
- Awards: Gairdner Foundation International Award (1966)
- Scientific career
- Fields: Immunology
- Workplaces: The Walter and Eliza Hall Institute of Medical Research, Melbourne

Jacques Francis Albert Pierre Miller AC FRS FAA (born 2 April 1931) is a French-Australian research scientist. He is known for having discovered the function of the thymus and for the identification of mammalian species of the two major subsets of lymphocytes (T cells and B cells) and their function.

== Early life and education ==
Miller was born on 2 April 1931 in Nice, France, as J.F.A.P. Meunier, and grew up in France, Switzerland and China, mostly in Shanghai. After the outbreak of World War II, in anticipation of Japan's entry into the war, his family moved in 1941 to Sydney, Australia, and changed their last name to "Miller". He was educated at St Aloysius' College in Sydney, where he met his future colleague, Sir Gustav Nossal.

Miller studied medicine at the University of Sydney, and had his first experience of laboratory research in the laboratory of Professor Patrick de Burgh where he studied virus infection.

== Career ==
In 1958, Miller travelled to the United Kingdom on a Gaggin Research Fellowship from the University of Queensland. He was accepted to the Chester Beatty Research Institute of Cancer Research (part of the Institute of Cancer Research, London) and as a PhD student at the University of London. Miller chose to study the pathogenesis of lymphocytic leukemia in mice, expanding on the research of Ludwik Gross into murine leukemia virus. Miller showed that experimental animals without a thymus at birth were incapable of rejecting foreign tissues and resisting many infections, thus demonstrating that the thymus is vital for the development and function of the adaptive immune system. Prior to this, the thymus was believed to be a vestigial organ with no function. His discovery has led many to describe Miller as the "world's only living person who can claim to have been the first to have described the functions of a human organ". In 1963, Miller continued his work into the function of the thymus at the National Institutes of Health.

In 1966, Miller returned to Australia to become a research group leader at the Walter and Eliza Hall Institute of Medical Research in Melbourne, at the invitation of its new director Sir Gustav Nossal, the successor of Sir Macfarlane Burnet. There, with student Graham Mitchell, he discovered that mammalian lymphocytes can be separated into what were later called T cells and B cells, and that these interact to allow normal antibody production (T cell help). Miller went on to show that the thymus produces the T cells, that it removes autoreactive T cells (central T cell tolerance) and several other landmark findings in immunology. These are considered crucial to understanding diseases such as cancer, autoimmunity and AIDS, as well as processes such as transplant rejection, allergy and antiviral immunity. Miller was also the first to provide evidence that thymus-derived immune cells are important for the defense against certain tumors, which forms the basis for modern cancer immunotherapy.

Semi-retired since 1996, Miller is still involved in immunological research.

Miller has had a longstanding interest in art, and studied art in the 1980s. His art has been exhibited at venues in Melbourne.

== Awards and honours ==
- 1966 Gairdner Foundation International Award
- 1967 Scientific Medal of the Zoological Society of London
- 1970 Elected a Fellow of the Royal Society, London
- 1971 Macfarlane Burnet Medal and Lecture of the Australian Academy of Science
- 1974 Paul Ehrlich and Ludwig Darmstaedter Prize
- 1978 Rabbi Shai Shacknai Memorial Prize
- 1981 Officer of the Order of Australia (AO)
- 1982 Elected Foreign Associate for the United States National Academy of Science
- 1983 International St Vincent Prize; World Health Organization
- 1990 Sandoz Prize for Immunology
- 1990 Peter Medawar Prize for the Transplantation Society
- 1992 Croonian Prize, Royal Society
- 1995 J. Allyn Taylor International Prize in Medicine
- 2000 Florey Medal
- 2001 Royal Society of London Copley Medal
- 2001 Centenary Medal
- 2003 Prime Minister's Prize for Science
- 2003 Appointed a Companion of the Order of Australia (AC)
- 2015 ANZAAS Medal
- 2018 Japan Prize for Medicine and Medicinal Science
- 2019 Albert Lasker Award for Basic Medical Research

== See also ==
- French Australians

== Seminal publications ==
- Miller J. F. (30 September 1961). "Immunological function of the thymus". Lancet. 2 (7205): 748–9. doi:10.1016/s0140-6736(61)90693-6. PMID 14474038.
- Miller J. F. (26 June 1964). "The thymus and the development of immunologic responsiveness". Science. 144 (3626): 1544–51. Bibcode:1964Sci...144.1544M. doi:10.1126/science.144.3626.1544. PMID 14169340.
- Miller J. F.; Mitchell, G. F. (18 November 1967). "The thymus and the precursors of antigen reactive cells". Nature. 216 (5116): 659–63. Bibcode:1967Natur.216..659M. doi:10.1038/216659a0. PMID 6082462. S2CID 4282516.
- Miller J. F.; Sprent J. (1 July 1971). "Cell-to-cell interaction in the immune response. VI. Contribution of thymus-derived cells and antibody-forming cell precursors to immunological memory". J Exp Med. 134 (1): 66–82. doi:10.1084/jem.134.1.66. PMC 2139027. PMID 5105057.
