= Olivera Finn =

American immunologist

- Born: Olivera Jankovic; November 2, 1949 (age 76); Niš, Yugoslavia
- Citizenship: American
- Education: Inter American University of Puerto Rico (BS); Stanford University (PhD) (Postdoc)
- Spouse: Seth Finn (m. 1967)
- Children: 2
- Awards: University of Pittsburgh Chancellor's Distinguished Research Award (1996); AAI Lifetime Achievement Award (2016); NCI Outstanding Investigator Award (2016); AACR-CRI Lloyd J. Old Award in Cancer Immunology (2017); American Cancer Society Faculty Award; UPCI Scientific Leadership Award; University of Pittsburgh Mentor of the Year Award; Department of Molecular Genetics and Biochemistry Faculty Award; AAI Excellence in Mentoring Award (2026)
- Scientific career
- Fields: Immunology
- Institutions: University of Pittsburgh; Duke University
- Thesis: Induction and characterization of functionally specific murine T-cell lymphomas (1979)
- Doctoral advisor: Henry Seymour Kaplan
- Other academic advisors: Arthur S. Levine; Bernard Amos; Richard Metzgar; Ron Herberman; Ronald Levy

Olivera J. Finn is a Yugoslav-American immunologist who is a distinguished professor and former chair of the department of immunology at the University of Pittsburgh (2001–2013) and former director of the Cancer Immunology Program at the University of Pittsburgh Cancer Institute (1999–2014). She was president of the American Association of Immunologists from 2007 to 2008 and served on the AAI Council from 2002 to 2006.

== Early life and education ==
Finn was born on November 2, 1949, in Niš, Yugoslavia (now Serbia). She grew up and went to high school in Niš, a city in what is now Serbia. She moved to the United States when she was 18 years old, having married an American. They settled in San Juan, Puerto Rico, where her husband was stationed for three years as a Coast Guard officer.

In Puerto Rico, she earned her Bachelor of Science in Biology from the Inter American University of Puerto Rico at San Juan. At the IAUPR, she was one of Dr. Alexander Acholonu's students. She published her first paper as an undergraduate, about completing a life cycle of a parasite.

When her husband was discharged into the reserves they moved to Stanford, California. Finn graduated with a Doctor of Philosophy in Immunology from Stanford University in 1980 and completed her postdoctoral fellowship at the university in 1982.
