= Susan L. Swain =

American immunologist

- Born: Columbus, OH
- Education: Oberlin College (BA); Harvard Medical School (PhD)
- Awards: AAI Lifetime Award (2012)
- Scientific career
- Fields: immunology pathology
- Institutions: UCSD (1976-1996); Trudeau Institute (1996-2010); U. Mass. Medical School (2010-)

Susan L. Swain is a professor of pathology and former director and president of the Trudeau Institute, NY. She was president of the American Association of Immunologists in 2004/5.

== Biography ==
Swain was born in Columbus, Ohio. Her father was a professor of mathematics; her mother, a journalist. She attended Oberlin College, majoring in biology, and received her Ph.D. in immunology from Harvard Medical School. In 1976 she took her first academic appointment as lecturer and research biologist at the University of California, San Diego in La Jolla. She stayed at UCSD, becoming professor of biology in 1989, until her appointment as director and Edward C. Brewster Chair of the Trudeau Institute (1996–2007). She also served as president (2003–2007) and president emeritus (2008–2010) of the Trudeau Institute. Since 2010 she has been professor of pathology at the University of Massachusetts Medical School, Worcester, MA.

She was president of the American Association of Immunologists in 2004/5 and served on the AAI council from 1999 to 2004.

== Research ==
Swain has investigated the cellular and molecular mechanisms by which CD4 T cells contribute to immunity. Her research topics include the function of T cell subsets at the effector stage; the generation of memory CD4 T cells and their role in protection against infection; and age-related defects in T cell function.

== Awards ==
Swain was elected a Fellow of the American Association for Advancement of Science in 2007. In 2010, she received a Lifetime Achievement Award from the American Association of Immunologists.
