= John Holmes Dingle =

John Holmes Dingle (24 November 1908–15 September 1973) was an American physician and medical professor.

== Early life and education ==
Dingle was born in Cooperstown, North Dakota in 1908. His father, a Methodist minister, had six much older children by a first marriage, while Dingle was the only child of a second marriage. The family moved to Seattle when he was thirteen, five years after the death of his father, to live with one of his half-brothers.

Dingle completed his bachelor's and master's degrees in pharmacology at the University of Washington, before completing a doctorate at Johns Hopkins University's School of Hygiene and Public Health in 1933. He spent the next two years as a bacteriologist with the Maryland State Department of Health Laboratory and Upjohn Company. In 1935 he entered Harvard Medical School, where he studied under Hans Zinsser. During his time at medical school, Dingle, along with fellow student Leroy Fothergill, confirmed that birds played a role in the transmission of Eastern equine encephalitis, which had recently killed five children in New England. He had contributed to more than twenty published papers by the time of his graduation.

== Medical career ==
After completing his MD in 1939, he spent a year as house officer at Boston Children's Hospital. He then joined the staff of Boston City Hospital's Thorndike Memorial Laboratory as the Francis Weld Peabody Fellow. In 1941 he became an instructor in Harvard's Department of Bacteriology and Immunology. During World War II, Dingle joined the Army Medical Corps. He headed the Commission on Acute Respiratory Diseases at Fort Bragg. After the end of the war, Dingle and several others who had served in his department founded the Department of Preventative Medicine at Western Reserve University (later Case Western Reserve University). He remained on the staff there for the rest of his life.

=== Later years ===
Dingle began using a wheelchair in 1969 as a result of an undiagnosed musculoskeletal disorder. He stepped down as department head afterwards, but remained on the teaching staff until his death of heart attack four years later. He was survived by his second wife, Doris V. Brown, and their two children.

== Honors and awards ==
Dingle received numerous awards during his career. For his service to the military, in both uniformed and civilian roles, he received the Legion of Merit and the Outstanding Civilian Service Award. He was awarded membership of the National Academy of Sciences in 1958. He received the Albert Lasker Award for Clinical Medical Research in 1959 for his research on respiratory ailments. He served as president of the American Association of Immunologists, the American Epidemiological Society, and the Central Society for Clinical Research.
