= Leslie J. Berg =

American immunologist

Academic background
- Education: BA, Biology, 1980, Harvard University; PhD, Molecular Biology, 1986, University of California, Berkeley
- Thesis: Bovine papilloma virus replication control (1986)

Academic work
- Institutions: University of Colorado School of Medicine; University of Massachusetts Medical School

Leslie Joan Berg is an American immunologist. As a professor at University of Massachusetts Medical School, she was elected the 95th president of the American Association of Immunologists for a one-year term from 2011 to 2012. Berg’s research focuses on understanding the signal transduction pathways—the succession of reactions inside the cell as it changes one kind of stimulus, or signal, into another—important for T-cell development and activation, and the generation of protective immunity to infections.

== Early life ==
Berg earned her Bachelor of Arts degree at Harvard University and her PhD at the University of Massachusetts Medical School. She completed her postdoctoral fellowship at Stanford University School of Medicine.

== Career ==
Berg joined the faculty at the University of Massachusetts Medical School in 1998. During her tenure, her research focuses on understanding the signal transduction pathways—the succession of reactions inside the cell as it changes one kind of stimulus, or signal, into another—important for T-cell development and activation, and the generation of protective immunity to infections. In 2011, Berg was elected the 95th president of the American Association of Immunologists (AAI) for a one-year term from 2011 to 2012. She also served as the first co-editor-in-chief of ImmunoHorizons with Michael S. Krangel and sat on AAI's Council from 2006 to 2013.

In 2018, Berg left the University of Massachusetts Medical School to chair the Department of Immunology and Microbiology at the University of Colorado School of Medicine. She continued to serve as the co-editor-in-chief of ImmunoHorizons during that year and was later elected a Distinguished Fellow of AAI in 2020.
