= Marc K. Jenkins =

American Immunologist

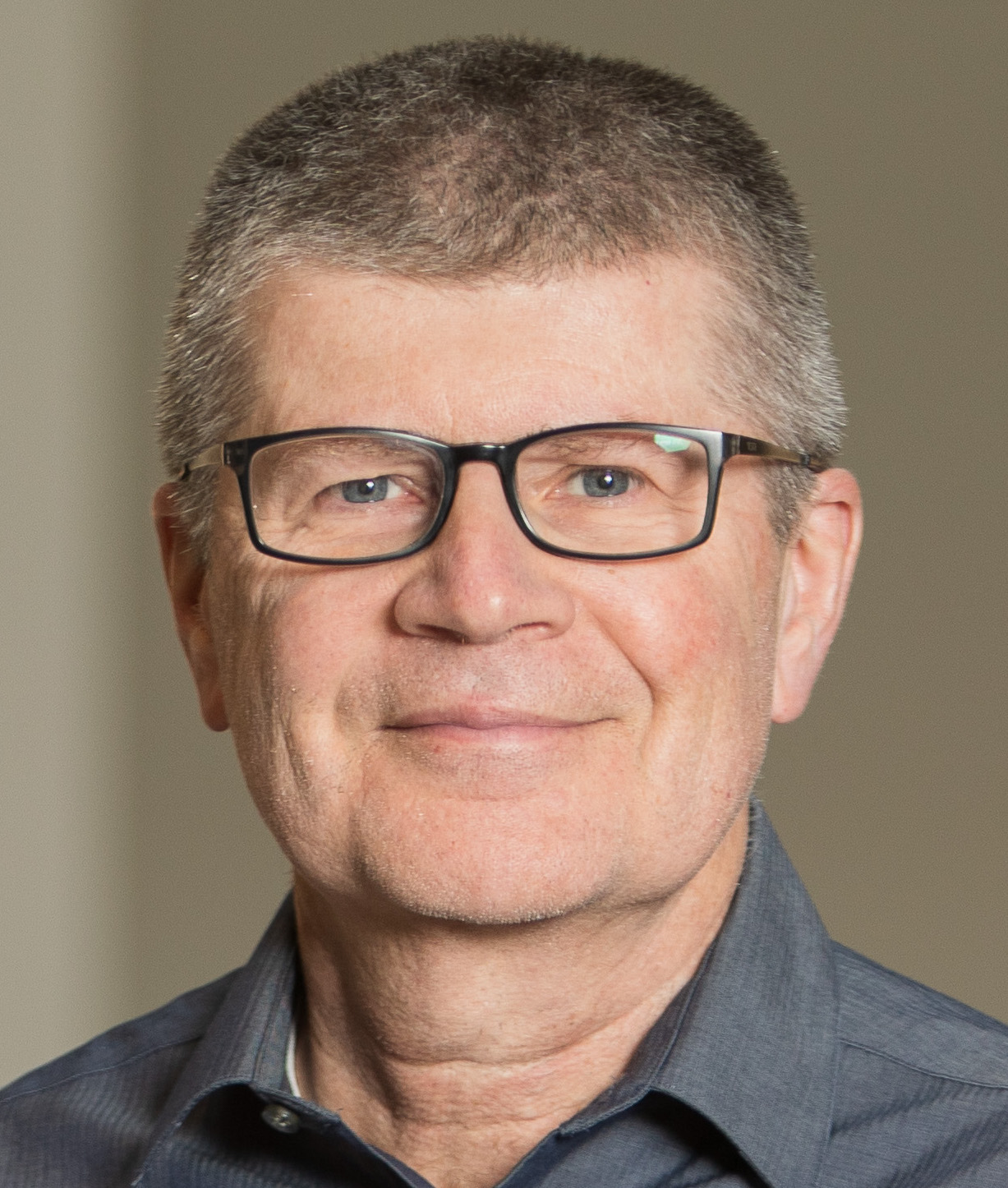
- Born: Minnesota, USA
- Education: B.S. University of Minnesota 1980 Ph.D. Northwestern University 1985 Postdoctoral Fellowship, National Institutes of Health 1985-1988
- Employer: University of Minnesota
- Spouse: Karen Jenkins

Marc K. Jenkins is a Regents Professor and Director of the Center for Immunology at the University of Minnesota. He is a member of the National Academy of Sciences.

== Education ==
Jenkins received his B.S. in Microbiology from the University of Minnesota in 1980. He completed his Ph.D. in Microbiology and Immunology in 1985 from Northwestern University and then conducted postdoctoral training in the Laboratory of Immunology at the National Institutes of Health from 1985 to 1988.

== Career ==
In 1988, Jenkins joined the Microbiology Department at the University of Minnesota where he is now a Regents Professor and Director of the UMN Center for Immunology. He conducts immunology research on antigen-specific helper T cells and B cells. Along with his work at the University of Minnesota, he has also been an active member of the American Association of Immunologists (AAI) where he served as president from 2013 to 2014.

== Research achievements ==
Jenkins's research has focused on CD4+ T cells, which are cells of the immune system that control infections and cancers. With Ronald Schwartz, Jenkins showed that CD4+ T cells require costimulatory signals in addition to engagement of the T cell antigen receptor to become fully activated and avoid entering a state of unresponsiveness called anergy. His group at the University of Minnesota showed that antigen-specific CD4+ T cells first become activated in the central part of lymph nodes, then migrate to B cell-rich follicles and non-lymphoid organs, and documented the cellular changes that produce immune memory.

His current studies seek to understand the mechanisms of CD4+ T cell activation, memory cell formation, and immune protection, with the ultimate goal of using basic immunology discoveries to make better vaccines and prevent unwanted immune responses such as transplant rejection and autoimmunity.

== Community service ==
Jenkins has lived in Richfield, MN for the last 35 years. He worked on behalf of the Richfield Public Schools and was elected to the District 280 school board in 2004. In 2020, he received the Key to the City of Richfield in part for his service to the community.

== Awards and honors ==
- National Academy of Sciences, 2020
- Lifetime Achievement Award, American Association of Immunologists, 2020
- University of Minnesota Regents Professor, 2018
- AAI Excellence in Mentoring award, 2018
- Pew Scholar in the Biomedical Sciences Award, 1989
