= Scripps Research Graduate Program =

- Type: Graduate school
- Established: 1989
- Dean: Keary M. Engle
- Faculty: 200
- Undergraduates: None
- Postgraduates: 300
- Location: San Diego, California; Jupiter, Florida, USA
- Website: education.scripps.edu

The Scripps Research Graduate Program is a graduate school of Scripps Research. It offers doctoral (Ph.D.) degrees in the chemical and biological sciences.

In 1989, the Scripps Research Institute launched the Macromolecular and Cellular Structure and Chemistry (MCSC) Program which offered graduate training in the biological sciences. This was quickly followed by the establishment of the Chemistry Program in 1992. The Scripps Research Institute's Graduate Program offers an interdisciplinary Doctoral Program in Chemical and Biological Sciences. In 2003, TSRI redefined the curriculum to allow and encourage students to sculpt course loads in an interdisciplinary manner. In 2005, TSRI's Graduate Program expanded to encompass the Jupiter, Florida campus.

The school is headquartered in San Diego, California (32.895°N 117.241°W), with a second campus in Jupiter, Florida (26.885°N 80.114°W) . According to the U.S. News & World Report, the school in 2014 was ranked 7th in chemistry (2nd in biochemistry, 6th in organic chemistry), and 9th in biological sciences.

The student body is currently ~300 and is mentored by more than 200 scientific faculty, including Nobel Laureates Kurt Wuthrich and Karl Barry Sharpless, and more than 500 post-doctoral fellows. Keary M. Engle is the current dean and Katja Lamia and Laura Solt are the current associate deans.

In addition to its own doctoral program, TSRI's Graduate Program offers Skaggs-Oxford Scholarships jointly with the University of Oxford.

TSRI's Graduate Program has been accredited by the Western Association of Schools and Colleges (WASC) Senior College and University Commission since 1993.

At the 2026 commencement the 34th graduating class comprised 49 doctoral degree recipients.
