= Hugh McDevitt =

American immunologist (1930–2022)

Hugh O'Neill McDevitt ForMemRS (26 August 1930 – 28 April 2022) was an immunologist and Professor of Microbiology and Immunology at Stanford University School of Medicine.

== Biography ==
McDevitt was born in Ohio. His father was a surgeon and was Irish. After receiving his M.D. from Harvard University in 1955 and completing his residency in New York, McDevitt was a captain in the U.S. Army and a special fellow for the National Institutes of Medical Research in London.

== Career ==
He began studying under Dr. Albert Coons and later Dr. John Humphrey. In Dr. Humphrey's lab he started exploring the MHC and immune response. From 1966 onward, he taught at Stanford University, where his various roles included being chief of the Division of Immunology and Rheumatology, director of the Clinical Immunology Laboratory, and chairman of the Department of Microbiology and Immunology.

McDevitt was best-known for his discovery of immune response genes and the first definitive physical map of the major histocompatibility complex (MHC). Specifically, his work focused on how the histocompatibility molecules regulate the immune response and their role in the development and function of the immune system.

McDevitt won awards "for his landmark discovery and identification of genes that control immune responsiveness, and his subsequent elucidation of mechanisms of antigen recognition and induction of the immune response."

His research focused on identifying and understanding how certain cells and specific sequence polymorphisms in a class II MHC molecule initiate diabetes and how T cells can prevent and suppress the transfer of diabetes. Along with Dr. Qing Li, they discovered that interferon-alpha, an immune signal, can trigger the onset of type-1 diabetes. "A normal process - programmed cell death - causes a normal response," McDevitt said. "But it does this in such a way that, in a small subset of the population, it starts them on the road to type-1 diabetes." He was considered an expert in the field of major histocompatibility class II molecules. His laboratory worked on identifying peptide fragments of proteins which lead to the inflammation and destruction of islet beta cells.

He also achieved acclaim for his contributions to arthritis research.

McDevitt mentored and taught many leaders in the field of immunology, and many members of the Stanford Immunology faculty. Each year, the Hugh McDevitt Prize is presented to the Ph.D. candidate with the best dissertation research in the Immunology program at Stanford University.

== Awards and honors ==
McDevit received numerous awards and honors for his research related contributions. These include: the Borden Award for Outstanding Research from the Association of American Medical Colleges; the Lee C. Howley, Sr. prize for Research in Arthritis; Outstanding Investigator, National Cancer Institute; Barbara Davis Diabetes Award; Abbott Laboratories Award in Clinical and Diagnostic Immunology.

He held the title of Outstanding Investigator, National Cancer Institute, and was elected to the National Academy of Sciences, The Institute of Medicine of the National Academy of Sciences, and the Royal Society in London, England. He was a member of many societies, including the American Association for the Advancement of Science, and the American Association of Immunologists.
