= K. Frank Austen =

American medical researcher

K. Frank Austen (1928–2023) was an American professor of immunology and respiratory diseases at the Harvard Medical School. He won a Gairdner Foundation Award, a Kober Medal and a Warren Alpert Prize for his medical research. He graduated from Amherst College and Harvard Medical School.

== History ==
Austen was born in Ohio. His early health complications with paralytic polio influenced him into entering the medical field.
