= Ellen Vitetta =

American immunologist

- Education: Connecticut College; New York University
- Occupations: Professor of Microbiology and Immunology
- Known for: Director of the Cancer Immunobiology Center at the University of Texas Southwestern Medical Center in Dallas

Ellen S. Vitetta is the director of the Cancer Immunobiology Center at the University of Texas Southwestern Medical Center in Dallas.

== Early life ==
Vitetta earned a Bachelor of Arts degree at Connecticut College and advanced degrees at New York University Medical and Graduate Schools.

== Career ==
Vitetta is a professor of microbiology and immunology, the director of the Cancer Immunobiology Center, and holds both the Sheryle Simmons Patigian Distinguished Chair in Cancer Immunobiology and a distinguished teaching chair at the University of Texas Southwestern Medical Center in Dallas. She has published 500 papers, edited several books, and is a co-inventor on 24 issued patents. She is recognized as one of the top 100 most cited biomedical scientists in the world.

Vitetta is an immunologist who conducts translational ("bench to bedside") research. Along with her colleagues, she was the first to describe IgD on the surface of murine B cells and co-discovered Interleukin-4. Her research group demonstrated that IL-4 acted as a "switch" factor for Ig on B cells. Over the past two decades, she has developed antibody-based "biological missiles" to target and eliminate cancer cells and cells infected with HIV. These innovative therapeutics have been extensively studied in tissue culture, animal models, and, since 1988, in over 300 human subjects. In 2001, Vitetta successfully developed a vaccine against ricin, which underwent evaluation in the first clinical trial of its kind.

Vitetta is a member of the National Academy of Sciences, the American Academy of Arts and Sciences, the Institute of Medicine and the American Academy of Microbiology. She was the first biomedical scientist from Texas elected to the National Academy of Sciences. She is a founding member R. Franklin Society. She served as president of the American Association of Immunologists in 1994 and received its Mentoring Award in 2002 and its Lifetime Achievement Award in 2007. In 2006, she was elected to the Texas Women's Hall of Fame. She currently serves on the board of advisors of Scientists and Engineers for America, an organization focused on promoting sound science in American government.

Vitetta's former student, Linda Buck, won the Nobel Prize in Physiology or Medicine in 2004.

== Awards and honors ==
- 2007 American Association of Immunologists Lifetime Achievement Award
- TAMEST board of directors (2007)
- Texas Women's Hall of Fame (2006)
- Institute of Medicine (2006)
- American Academy of Arts and Sciences (2003)
- Mentoring Award, American Association of Immunologists (2002)
- Charlotte Friend Award, American Association for Cancer Research (2002)
- Rosenthal Award, American Association for Cancer Research (1995)
- President, American Association of Immunologists (1994)
- National Academy of Sciences (1994)
- FASEB Excellence in Science Award (1991)
- American Academy of Microbiology
