= Arthur Weiss (scientist) =

American Immunologist

- Known for: T cell immunity
- Scientific career
- Fields: Immunology
- Workplaces: University of California, San Francisco; Howard Hughes Medical Institute

Arthur Weiss is an American Immunologist who is currently an Ephraim P. Engleman Distinguished Professor of Medicine and a professor of microbiology and immunology at the University of California, San Francisco. He has been a member of the National Academy of Sciences since 2003. He specializes in studying T cell development and immune responses. His research focus has recently been shifted towards studying autoimmune diseases such as lupus and rheumatoid arthritis. He is also a Howard Hughes Medical Investigator, a title he has held since 1982.
