= Merrill Chase =

American immunologist (1905–2004)

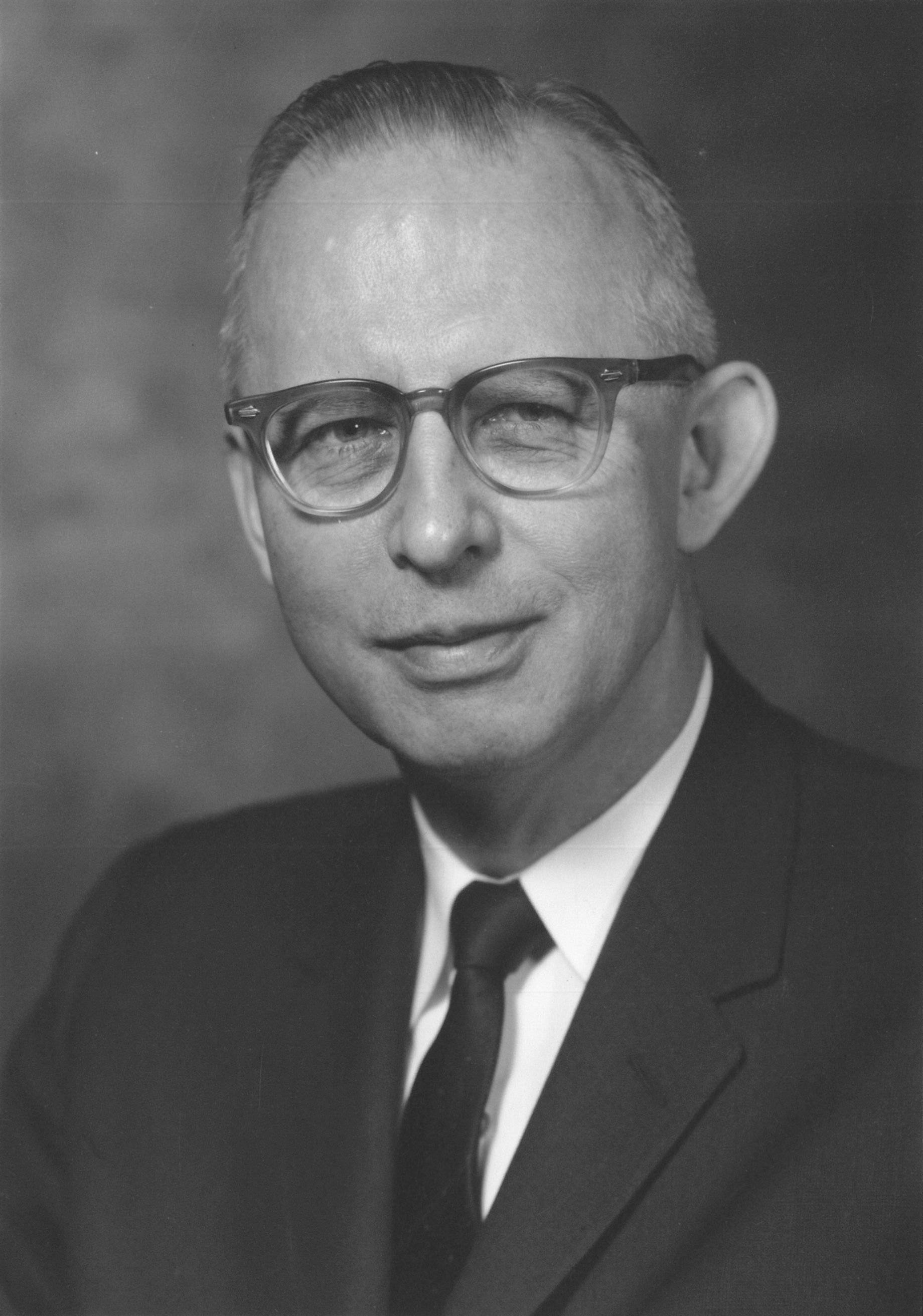
- Portrait of Merrill Chase in the 1960s
- Born: September 17, 1905; Providence, Rhode Island, U.S.
- Died: January 5, 2004 (aged 98)
- Education: Brown University
- Known for: T cell, B cell
- Scientific career
- Fields: Immunologist

Merrill W. Chase (September 17, 1905 – January 5, 2004) was an immunologist working at Rockefeller University in New York City who is credited with discovering cell-mediated immunology in the early 1940s. While working with Dr. Karl Landsteiner, Dr. Chase discovered that white blood cells, and not antibodies alone, were important instruments of the immune system. His findings laid the groundwork for later research that discovered the role of B cells, T cells and other types of white blood cells. Recognizing that other scientists were discovering multiple functions of the immune system, he established an independent Immunology laboratory at Rockefeller.
