= Barry Bloom =

American immunologist (1937–2026)

Barry R. Bloom
- Born: April 13, 1937; Philadelphia, Pennsylvania
- Died: March 18, 2026 (aged 88); Cambridge, Massachusetts, U.S.
- Education: Amherst College; Rockefeller University
- Known for: Immunology of tuberculosis, leprosy, malaria, and vaccines; Dean of Harvard School of Public Health
- Awards: Bristol-Myers Squibb Award for Distinguished Research in Infectious Diseases (first awardee); Robert Koch Medal; Novartis Award for Clinical Immunology
- Scientific career
- Fields: Public health; Immunology; Infectious disease
- Workplaces: Harvard T.H. Chan School of Public Health; Albert Einstein College of Medicine

Barry Robert Bloom (April 13, 1937 – March 18, 2026) was an American immunologist known for his research on the immune response to infectious diseases, including tuberculosis, leprosy, malaria, and COVID-19. He was the Joan L. and Julius H. Jacobson Professor of Public Health, Emeritus in the Department of Immunology and Infectious Diseases and the Department of Global Health and Population at the Harvard T.H. Chan School of Public Health, where he served as dean of the faculty from 1998 through 2008.

== Early life and education ==
Bloom stated that the influence of the numerous physicians in his family led him to expect a medical career, before choosing immunology research instead.

- A.B. (Biology), Amherst College, 1958
- Ph.D. (Immunology), Rockefeller University, 1963

== Academic career ==
From 1964 to 1998, Bloom was employed at the Albert Einstein College of Medicine, where he was chairman of the Department of Microbiology and Immunology from 1978 to 1990. In 1990, he became an investigator at the Howard Hughes Medical Institute, also serving on its national advisory board. In 1978, he acted as a consultant to the White House on international health policy.

As dean of the Harvard T.H. Chan School of Public Health (1999–2008), Bloom also served as secretary-treasurer of the Association of Schools of Public Health. During his tenure at Harvard, which lasted from 1999 until his death in 2026, he has held faculty appointments in the Departments of Immunology and Infectious Diseases and of Global Health and Population.

== Research contributions ==
Bloom was a leading scientist in immunology and global health. Much of his laboratory research focused on host immune responses to Mycobacterium tuberculosis, defining vitamin D-dependent antimicrobial mechanisms in macrophages and developing aerosolized nanoparticle vaccine approaches.

He chaired the WHO Technical and Research Advisory Committee to the Global Programme on Malaria, contributing to international strategies for malaria control and vaccine research. He also chaired WHO committees on leprosy and tuberculosis research, and served on the Scientific and Technical Advisory Committee of the UNDP/World Bank/WHO Special Programme for Research and Training in Tropical Diseases.

During the COVID-19 pandemic, Bloom provided expert analysis on vaccines and public health policy in national media and at Harvard press conferences. In 2020, he was appointed to the Massachusetts state advisory committee on coronavirus vaccines.

== Policy and advisory roles ==
Bloom was involved with the World Health Organization for more than four decades, serving on multiple advisory committees. He was the founding chair of the board of trustees for the International Vaccine Institute in South Korea, chaired the Vaccine Advisory Committee of UNAIDS, and was a member of the U.S. AIDS Research Committee. He served on scientific advisory boards for the Ellison Medical Foundation, the Wellcome Trust, the Earth Institute at Columbia University, and the Paul G. Rogers Society for Global Health Research.

== Personal life ==
Bloom was married to Irene (Tilenius) Bloom (who died in 2010), and they had a daughter Inae and a grandson Eric.

== Death ==
Bloom died of pancreatic cancer at his home in Cambridge, Massachusetts, on March 18, 2026, at the age of 88.

== Selected publications ==
- Bloom BR, Bennett B. "Mechanism of a reaction in vitro associated with delayed-type hypersensitivity." Science. 1966;153(3731):80–82.
- Modlin RL, Bloom BR. "Immunologic mechanisms in leprosy." Annual Review of Immunology. 1984;2:41–60.
- Liu PT, Stenger S, Li H, Wenzel L, Tan BH, Krutzik SR, Ochoa MT, Schauber J, Wu K, Meinken C, Kamen DL, Wagner M, Bals R, Steinmeyer A, Zügel U, Gallo RL, Eisenberg D, Hewison M, Hollis BW, Adams JS, Bloom BR, Modlin RL. "Toll-like receptor triggering of a vitamin D–mediated human antimicrobial response." Science. 2006;311(5768):1770–1773.
- Bloom, Barry R.; Lambert, Paul-Henri (23 June 2016). The Vaccine Book (2nd ed.). San Diego: Academic Press (Elsevier). p. 664. ISBN 978-0-12-802174-3.

A more complete list of publications is available at Harvard Catalyst.

== Awards and honors ==
- Bristol-Myers Squibb Award for Distinguished Research in Infectious Diseases (first awardee)
- Novartis Award for Clinical Immunology (1998, shared)
- Robert Koch Medal for lifetime research in infectious diseases (1999)
- Elected member, National Academy of Sciences (1987)
- Elected member, National Academy of Medicine
- Fellow, American Association for the Advancement of Science
- Fellow, American Philosophical Society
- Fellow, American Academy of Microbiology
