= Lewis Lanier =

American immunologist

Lewis Lee Lanier is an American immunologist who is an American Cancer Society Professor and the chair of the Department of Microbiology and Immunology at the University of California, San Francisco. Since 2010, he has been a member of the National Academy of Sciences. He specializes on studying NK cells.
