= Michael Heidelberger =

American immunologist (1888–1991)

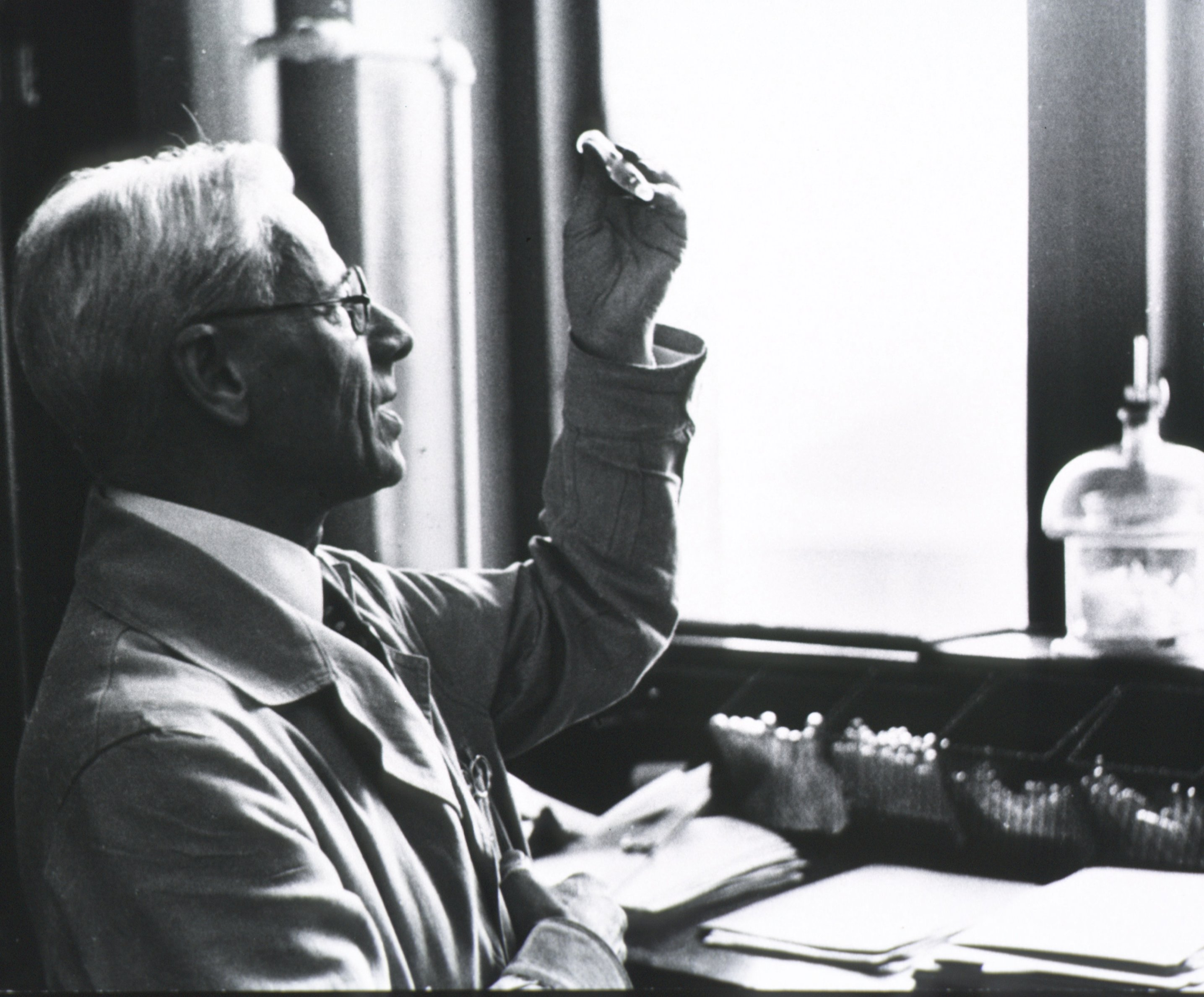
- Photograph of Heidelberger by Harold Low
- Born: April 29, 1888; New York City, US
- Died: June 25, 1991 (aged 103); New York City
- Education: Columbia University
- Known for: Properties of antibody
- Spouses: Nina Tachau (m. 1916; died 1946) Charlotte Rosen (m. 1956; died 1988)
- Awards: Lasker Award (1953); Centenary Prize (1959); National Medal of Science (1967); Louisa Gross Horwitz Prize (1977); Lasker Award (1978)
- Scientific career
- Fields: Organic chemistry Immunology
- Workplaces: Rockefeller Institute; Mount Sinai Hospital, New York; Columbia University; Rutgers University; New York University School of Medicine
- Doctoral advisor: Marston T. Bogert

Michael Heidelberger ForMemRS (April 29, 1888 – June 25, 1991) was an American immunologist, often regarded as the father of modern immunology. He and Oswald Avery showed that the polysaccharides of pneumococcus are antigens, enabling him to show that antibodies are proteins. He spent most his early career at Columbia University and comparable time in his later years on the faculty of New York University. In 1934 and 1936 he received the Guggenheim Fellowship. In 1967 he received the National Medal of Science, and then he earned the Lasker Award for basic medical research in 1953 and again in 1978. His papers are held at the National Library of Medicine in Bethesda, Maryland.

== Early life ==
Heidelberger was born in 1888 in New York City to a Jewish couple, David and Fannie Campe Heidelberger, a traveling salesman and a homemaker respectively. An older brother had died shortly after birth; a younger brother, Charles, was born 21 months after Michael. His paternal grandfather, also named Michael, was a German Jew who had emigrated to the United States in the early 1840s.

Heidelberger's father had only an elementary school education, and was on the road for six months out of the year selling window curtains. It fell to Heidelberger's mother to take charge of the household and of Michael's education. She had attended a private girls' school in Norfolk, Virginia, and after graduation had stayed with relatives in Germany for a year. Until Michael was twelve, she taught him and his younger brother at home. They attended classical concerts, had to speak German at the table, and were taught French by a nanny during outings to nearby Central Park. Later in life he came to appreciate his early training in languages that were central to scientific discourse during the first half of the twentieth century.

Heidelberger decided at age eight that he wanted to be a chemist, for reasons he could never quite articulate or recall, but which he later judged no more than a "pigheaded idea". He experimented at home by mixing medicines and the very basic ingredients included in children's chemistry sets of the time, until he began his formal training in botany, zoology, physics, and chemistry at the Ethical Culture School, a private high school on New York's Upper West Side founded by the Ethical Culture Society, a Humanist religious movement of which his parents were members. He maintained a connection with the school throughout his life, inviting student groups to visit his laboratory every year.

Heidelberger loved music and started playing the clarinet in the high school orchestra, stating "Ich bin ein Heidelberger!" (I am a Heidelberger!) was talented enough that concert musicians encouraged him to consider a professional career in music. Instead, it became his "chief relaxation." He played the same two handmade wood instruments, a B flat and an A clarinet, all of his life, taking them with him wherever he went to join in chamber music performances at conferences or at the homes of friends.

== Education and early research career ==
When Heidelberger entered Columbia University in 1905, his family moved to the Upper West Side so that he could live nearer to the school. He resided there for the rest of his long life. He received all of his academic degrees from Columbia, culminating with a Ph.D. in organic chemistry in 1911. His dissertation dealt with quinazoline analogs, alkaloids that his adviser, Marston Taylor Bogert, hoped—wrongly, as Heidelberger proved—would produce useful dyes when combined with phthalic acid. As a student he supported himself by selling Virginia hams to hotels and wholesale grocers around the city on Friday afternoons, earning up to $50 per week, and by teaching analytical chemistry under Irving Langmuir at Stevens Institute in Hoboken, New Jersey.

Urged on by his parents, Heidelberger after graduation with his Ph.D. arranged for a visit with his former family physician, Samuel J. Meltzer, who had seen him through typhoid fever as a young child and who had since become the first chair of the Department of Physiology at the newly founded Rockefeller Institute of Medical Research. Meltzer curtly advised Heidelberger that he ought not to go into science, because "science is no profession for a poor man's son." Heidelberger quickly realized that Meltzer was testing his commitment to science, and he insisted that he wanted to become a chemist. Meltzer relented, and sent him on to meet with the institute's chemists, Phoebus A. T. Levene, Donald D. Van Slyke, and Walter A. Jacobs, whom Heidelberger found assembled over tea. They advised him to go to Europe for postdoctoral training, then a requirement for any scientist who wanted to find a position at a leading research university in the United States.

Heidelberger took their advice and in 1911 went to Zürich to work for a year in the laboratory of the organic chemist and future Nobel Laureate Richard Willstätter at the Eidgenössische Technische Hochschule. There he perfected the synthesis of cyclooctatetraene, an important intermediate in organic research. Willstätter helped his somewhat impecunious American student by sharing the cost of laboratory supplies with him, arranging that when expensive materials, such as silver nitrate, were to be bought, it was his turn to pay, while Heidelberger took turns buying cheaper materials like sulfuric acid. "Better training than that you couldn't have," Heidelberger summed up his experience with Willstätter. They remained friends for three decades, through Willstätter's flight from Germany in 1938 and until his death in Switzerland in 1942.

While visiting relatives in Germany on his return from Zürich, Heidelberger received a telegram from his father relating an offer of a position of Fellow of the Rockefeller Institute, conditional upon a personal interview and approval by the institute's director, Simon Flexner.

== Rockefeller Institute ==
Heidelberger passed muster, and in September 1912 began working in Walter Abraham Jacobs' laboratory on a derivative of hexamethylene tetramine, a complex that seemed to prolong the life of monkeys suffering from polio, and that Flexner hoped could be adapted for use in humans. Results appeared promising at first, but Heidelberger and Jacobs later attributed them to loss of virulence of the virus.

In the summer of 1915, after attending officer training camp in Plattsburgh, New York, for a proposed volunteer army (an outgrowth of the movement to prepare the United States for entry into World War I) and earning a commendation as a marksman, Heidelberger traveled to Lake Kezar in Maine for a vacation. After performing Pergolesi's Nina there, his piano accompanist exclaimed, "meet Nina," and in walked a young lady, Nina Tachau. They were married in 1916 to the strains of a wedding march composed by Heidelberger. She was a writer and activist for the New York chapter of the League of Women Voters and, during the 1940s, for the American Association for the United Nations. After her death from cancer in 1946, Heidelberger continued her work on behalf of the United Nations, and was a member of the U.S. delegation to meetings of the World Federation of United Nations Organizations in Prague, Bangkok, and other cities. He met his second wife Charlotte Rosen at a concert. She was the violist in a Mozart trio in which Heidelberger performed. They married in 1956. For ten years prior to her death in 1988, he took care of her at home while she suffered from Alzheimer's disease.

After the United States declared war on Germany in April 1917, Heidelberger was commissioned in the Sanitary Corps and assigned to the Rockefeller Institute. He continued to work with Jacobs, a collaboration that lasted more than nine years and produced 44 papers. They synthesized many chemotherapeutical drugs, namely aromatic arsenicals, for the treatment for infectious diseases, in particular syphilis and African sleeping sickness. In 1919 they developed a variant of Paul Ehrlich's "magic bullet" for syphilis, Salvarsan, which proved effective against trypanosomes, the parasites that cause African sleeping sickness. Variants of tryparsamide, as Flexner named it, continue to be administered today. In 1953 the king of Belgium, colonial ruler of parts of Africa in which African sleeping sickness had been endemic, honored Heidelberger and Jacobs for their discovery.

In 1921 Heidelberger transferred to the laboratory of Donald D. Van Slyke at the Rockefeller hospital, where he spent the next two years developing a method for preparing large quantities of purified oxyhemoglobin, with its oxygen-carrying capacity intact, for Van Slyke's studies of the uptake and release of oxygen in the blood. When Karl Landsteiner, the famous Austrian immunologist and discoverer of human blood groups, arrived at the institute in 1922, Heidelberger embarked with him on studies of the antigenic properties of different types of hemoglobin. Throughout his life Heidelberger was proud to state that he first learned immunology from Landsteiner.

During this time Heidelberger was approached by the bacteriologist Oswald Avery to help him elucidate the chemistry of the "specific soluble substance" Avery and Alphonse R. Dochez had found in the spherical capsule that envelops pneumococcus and many other species of bacteria. In 1923, Heidelberger and Avery reported that this capsular substance, which determined the specific type of pneumococcus and, with it, its virulence, consisted of polysaccharides, carbohydrate molecules made up of more than three monosaccharide units. Their discovery for the first time established a relationship between chemical constitution and immunological specificity of antigens, thereby putting the field of immunology on a firm biochemical footing. It also disproved prevailing assumptions among scientists that only proteins could act as antigens.

Heidelberger devoted the rest of his career largely to pursuing the consequences of his and Avery's seminal discovery. He identified and analyzed the structure of different pneumococcal polysaccharides—over one hundred have since been found—as well as of other microorganisms, and studied their role in immune reactions. In 1927 he left the Rockefeller Institute to become head of the chemical laboratory at Mount Sinai Hospital. A year later he moved to the Columbia University College of Physicians and Surgeons.

== Columbia University ==
The door to his office, which he likened to "42nd Street and Broadway" because of its traffic. During his 27 years there he used his unique knowledge of polysaccharide antigen chemistry to develop methods, in particular the precipitin reaction, for isolating pure antibodies, which he proved were protein and which he measured in absolute units of weight for the first time.

He and his collaborators Forrest E. Kendall (1899–1987) and Elvin A. Kabat formulated a quantitative theory of precipitin and other immune reactions, which showed that such reactions unfolded in three distinct stages and which posited that antigens and antibodies were bi-or multivalent, meaning that they could combine in varying proportions. These findings enabled Heidelberger to develop a much more potent antiserum to meningitis in infants, as well as a simple but effective vaccine against several forms of pneumonia, which was successfully tested among Army Air Force recruits in 1944.

== Later life ==
Upon his retirement from Columbia in 1954, Heidelberger moved to the Institute of Microbiology at Rutgers University, and in 1964 to the New York University School of Medicine. There he continued his research on pneumococcal polysaccharides and their cross-reactions with various types of antisera, always in pursuit of his lifelong objective to relate chemical structure to immunological specificity, working full-time until the age of 100, and then part-time until his death in 1991 at the age of 103.

Heidelberger received fifteen honorary degrees and 46 medals, citations, and awards for his work, including two Albert Lasker Awards in 1953 and 1978, the Louisa Gross Horwitz Prize in 1977, the National Medal of Science from President Lyndon B. Johnson in 1967, and the Bronze Medal of the City of Paris in 1964. He was a member of the National Academy of Sciences and the New York Academy of Medicine, as well as an officer of the Légion d'honneur of France. He served twice as president of the American Association of Immunologists, in 1947 and 1949. Both times his presidential addresses urged scientists to resist nuclear armament and restrictions on free exchanges among scientists across national boundaries imposed in the name of national loyalty and security. He was also a member of both the American Academy of Arts and Sciences and the American Philosophical Society. He published a scientific paper in every decade of the 20th century. Each year, Columbia University hosts a lecture in honor of Heidelberger and Elvin A. Kabat, his first PhD student.
