= Journal of Immunology =

- Discipline: Immunology
- Language: English
- Edited by: Gail A. Bishop, Ph.D.

Publication details
- Former names: Journal of Immunology, Virus Research and Experimental Chemotherapy
- History: 1916–present
- Publisher: American Association of Immunologists (United States)
- Frequency: Biweekly
- Open access: Delayed after 12 months
- Impact factor: 3.3 (2024)

Standard abbreviations
- ISO 4: J. Immunol.
- NLM: J Immunol

Indexing
- CODEN: JOIMA3
- ISSN: 0022-1767 (print); 1550-6606 (web)
- LCCN: 52052893
- OCLC no.: 1778718

Links
- Journal homepage; Online access; Online archive

The Journal of Immunology is a biweekly peer-reviewed medical journal that publishes basic and clinical studies in all aspects of immunology. Established in 1916, it changed its name to Journal of Immunology, Virus Research and Experimental Chemotherapy from 1943 to 1949, then returned to the original Journal of Immunology in 1950. It is the official journal of the American Association of Immunologists. The editor-in-chief is Gail A. Bishop.

== Abstracting and indexing ==
The journal is abstracted and indexed in:

- BIOSIS Previews
- CAB Abstracts
- Chemical Abstracts
- Current Contents/Life Sciences
- EBSCO databases
- Embase
- Index Medicus/MEDLINE/PubMed
- Science Citation Index
- Scopus

According to the Journal Citation Reports, the journal has a 2024 impact factor of 3.3.

== History ==
The journal was established by Arthur Fernandez Coca (1875–1959) in 1916 as the official journal of the American Association of Immunologists and the New York Society for Serology and Hematology. Coca was sole editor from 1916 to 1925, when John C. Torrey joined the journal. From 1916 to 1925, the journal was published every two months, and from 1926 to 1985 (except in 1928) it was published monthly. The journal has been published twice a month since 1986.
