= Kabát (disambiguation) =

Kabát is a hard rock band hailing from Teplice, Czech Republic.

Kabát or Kabat may also refer to:

== People ==
- Carl Kabat (1933–2022), American Catholic priest and anti-nuclear activist
- Dušan Kabát (1944–2022), Slovak association football player
- Elvin A. Kabat (1914–2000), American biomedical scientist
- Geoffrey Kabat, American cancer epidemiologist
- Greg Kabat (1911–1994), running back in the Canadian Football League
- Jindřich Kabát (1953–2020), Czech psychologist, professor, and politician
- Jon Kabat-Zinn (born 1944), Professor of Medicine Emeritus at the University of Massachusetts Medical School
- Péter Kabát (born 1977), Hungarian football player
- Stacey Kabat, American anti-domestic violence advocate

== Places ==
- Kabat, Kerman, a village in Kerman Province, Iran
- Kabat, Kermanshah, a village in Kermanshah Province, Iran
- Kabat, South Khorasan, a village in South Khorasan Province, Iran

== See also ==
- Kabat numbering scheme, a widely used numbering scheme for amino acid residues in antibodies, named after Elvin A. Kabat]
- Kabaty, a residential neighborhood in Warsaw, Poland
