= Kahat =

Kahat or Kaht may refer to

- Kaht, a village in Iran
- Darb-e Kahat, a village in Iran
- Kahat, an ancient city at the Tell Barri archaeological site in Syria
- Roi Kahat (born 1992), Israeli football midfielder
