= KOAI (disambiguation) =

KOAI may refer to:

- KNAZ-TV, a television station licensed to Flagstaff, Arizona, that was known as KOAI from 1970 to 1981
- KHKS, a radio station licensed to Denton, Texas, that was known as KOAI from 1987 to 1992
- KMVK, a radio station licensed to Fort Worth, Texas, that was known as KOAI from 1992 to 2006
- KJQS, a defunct radio station licensed to Van Buren, Arkansas, that was known as KOAI from 2006 to 2012
- KZON, a radio station licensed to Sun City West, Arizona, that was known as KOAI from 2014 to 2026

== See also ==
- Qobad, a village in Iran that is also known as "Koāi".
