= AAFA =

AAFA may refer to:

- Asthma and Allergy Foundation of America
- American Apparel and Footwear Association
- American Academy of the Fine Arts
- American Amateur Football Association, the former name of the United States Soccer Federation
