= Lexington Ballet Company =

Lexington Ballet Company, Inc.

General information
- Name: Lexington Ballet Company, Inc.
- Local name: LBC
- Previous names: Jorgensen Ballet
- Year founded: 1974
- Founders: Nels Jorgensen
- Principal venue: Lexington Opera House; EKU Center for the Arts; Pam Miller Downtown Arts Center
- Website: www.lexingtonballet.org

Other
- Official school: Lexington Ballet School
- Formation: Company; Ensemble

The Lexington Ballet Company is a ballet company located in Lexington, Kentucky. The ballet was founded in 1974 by Nels Jorgenson and granted status as a 501(c)(3) organization in 1975.

== History ==
Nels Jorgensen established Jorgensen Ballet on 1974 with a grant from the National Endowment for the Arts. It was granted 501(c)(3) status under the name Lexington Ballet Company, Inc in 1975. In 1986 Lexington Ballet Company moved into ArtsPlace at 161 North Mill Street in Lexington, Kentucky. Also in 1986 Karl and Colette Kaufman founded the annual Lexington Ballet Summer Intensive program. In 1987 Lexington Ballet hosted the Southeastern Regional Ballet Association (SERBA) gathering attended by 650 dancers, teachers and choreographers. In 1989 Karl Kaufman and Kirt Hathaway establishes the annual Ballet Under the Stars in Lexington, Kentucky. in 2008 MAD Camp was established as an annual youth Music, Arts, Dance camp. In 2009 the Educational Outreach program is updated to support dance education in Title I schools funded by a generous grant from W. Paul and Lucille Caudill Little Foundation.

Lexington Ballet performed in the opening ceremony of the FEI World Equestrian Games in Lexington, Kentucky in 2010. Lexington Ballet was recognized in 2013 with the Salute to Small Business Phoenix Award presented by Commerce Lexington, Inc. In 2020, due to the COVID-19 pandemic, the Lexington ballet did a virtual showing of their yearly Nutcracker performance with covid masks and showed it on Vimeo.
