= Elvin A. Kabat =

American biomedical scientist

Elvin Abraham Kabat
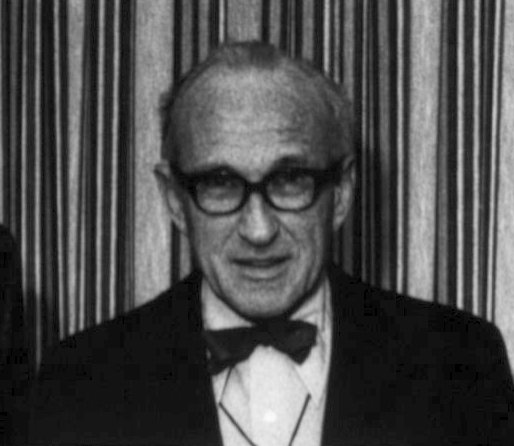
- Born: September 1, 1914; Manhattan, New York, U.S.
- Died: June 16, 2000 (aged 85); North Falmouth, Massachusetts, U.S.
- Education: City College of New York (BS); Columbia University College of Physicians and Surgeons (PhD)
- Known for: Discovering structure and genetics of antibodies
- Spouse: Sally Lennick
- Children: 3; including Jon Kabat-Zinn
- Awards: Eli Lilly Award in Bacteriology and Immunology (1949); Louisa Gross Horwitz Prize (1977); National Medal of Science (1991); American Association of Immunologists Lifetime Achievement Award (1995)
- Scientific career
- Fields: Immunology
- Workplaces: Columbia University; National Institutes of Health

Elvin Abraham Kabat (September 1, 1914 – June 16, 2000) was an American biomedical scientist and one of the founding fathers of quantitative immunochemistry. Kabat was awarded the Louisa Gross Horwitz Prize from Columbia University in 1977, National Medal of Science in 1991, and American Association of Immunologists Lifetime Achievement Award in 1995. He is the father of Jon Kabat-Zinn.

Elvin A. Kabat was the president of the American Association of Immunologists from 1965 to 1966, a member of the National Academy of Sciences, and a fellow of the American Academy of Arts and Sciences. He designed the eponymous Kabat numbering scheme for numbering amino acid residues in antibodies based on their variable regions. In 1969, he started collecting and aligning the amino acid sequences of human and mouse Bence Jones proteins and immunoglobulin light chains.

== Work ==
While working under Michael Heidelberger at the Columbia University College of Physicians and Surgeons, Kabat studied the carbohydrate chemistry of embryonic-state-specific antigens and markers of white blood cells. Additionally, he discovered the chemical basis of the ABO blood group system.

During World War II, Kabat worked for the National Defense Research Committee on developing a meningitis vaccine, accurate syphilis test, and detectors for neutralizing the plant toxin ricin.

Kabat is best known for discovering the structural and genetic basis for the specificity of antibodies. After showing that antibodies are gamma globulins, he used oligosaccharides of different lengths to interfere with antibodies attempting to bind to the blood plasma substitute dextran, accurately estimating the size and shape of antibody-binding sites before the development of X-ray crystallography.

During his career, Kabat served on advisory panels for the National Research Council, Office of Naval Research, National Science Foundation, National Multiple Sclerosis Society, American Foundation for Allergic Diseases, New York Blood Center, Roche Institute of Molecular Biology, Institute of Cancer Research, and Gorgas Memorial Laboratory, Panama. Additionally, he was a member of the World Health Organization's Advisory Panel on Immunology from 1965 to 1989.

== Life ==
Kabat's parents arrived in the United States from Eastern Europe toward the end of the 19th century, changing their last name from Kabatchnick to Kabat. The bankruptcy of his family's dress manufacturing business during the Great Depression led to Kabat's life-long miserly attitudes toward personal and laboratory expenditures. Elvin began high school in New York City at the age of 12. Graduating in three years, he started at the City College of New York at the age of 15, graduating in 1932 with a major in chemistry at age 18.

In January 1933, Kabat began working in Michael Heidelberger's laboratory by conducting routine lab chores at the Columbia University College of Physicians and Surgeons, introduced through Heidelberger's wife Nina, a customer of the Kabat family's dress business. Kabat started work on his Ph.D. in the Department of Biochemistry by taking night courses to graduate in only four years.

As part of a post-doctoral fellowship funded by the Rockefeller Foundation, Kabat studied new methods of ultracentrifugation and electrophoresis alongside Arne Tiselius and Kai Pederson in Theodor Svedberg's Uppsala University lab in Sweden to research Immunoglobulin G (IgG). In 1938, he returned to New York City to take up a position as an instructor of pathology at Cornell University Medical College, working there for three years.

Kabat spent the majority of his career as a faculty member of the Columbia University College of Physicians and Surgeons. Hired as a research associate by the department of biochemistry in 1941, he joined the faculty of the department of bacteriology as an assistant professor in 1946. Kabat became an associate professor of bacteriology in 1948, and a professor in the newly renamed department of microbiology in 1952. He was named the Higgins Professor of Microbiology in 1983, and Higgins Professor of Microbiology Emeritus in 1985. Aside from publishing over 470 articles and many textbooks while affiliated with Columbia University, he also taught future Nobel Laureate Baruj Benacerraf.

Following President Harry S. Truman's 1947 Executive Order 9835 mandating loyal screenings of all federal employees, Kabat was reported by Swedish biochemist James B. Sumner for supposedly being a Communist sympathizer. Kabat was dismissed from his research position at the Bronx Veterans Administration Hospital, interfering in his study of the histochemical localization of enzymes. Additionally, he was stripped of his passport and prevented from attending international conferences until the US District Court for the District of Columbia's 1955 ruling in Boudin v. Dulles that passports could not be denied over undisclosed information.

After being selected by the National Institutes of Health as a Fogarty Scholar in 1974, Kabat continued to conduct government research alongside his teaching at Columbia University well after his 1985 emeritus appointment, maintaining a working research laboratory and remaining an active member of the Department of Microbiology until his death.

== Personal life ==
In 1942, Kabat married Sally Lennick, a young Canadian art student. They had three children, one of whom is the American developer of mindfulness-based stress reduction (MBSR), Jon Kabat-Zinn. Since 2001, the families of Michael Heidelberger and Kabat have worked with Columbia University's Department of Microbiology and Immunology to organize a roughly annual Heidelberger-Kabat Distinguished Lecture in Immunology.
