= McConnell Springs Park =

- McConnell Springs
- U.S. National Register of Historic Places
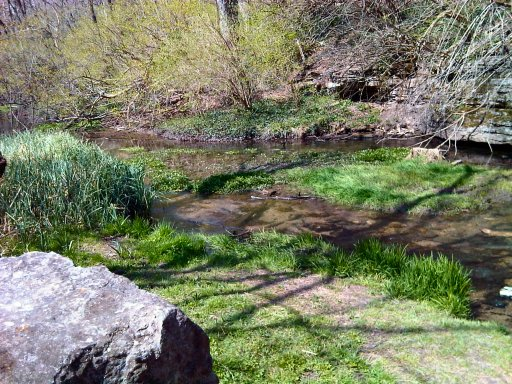

- Location within Kentucky Location within the United States
- Location: Lexington, Kentucky
- Coordinates: 38°3′19″N 84°31′40″W
- Area: 20 acres (8.1 ha)
- NRHP reference No.: 76000874
- Added to NRHP: January 17, 1976

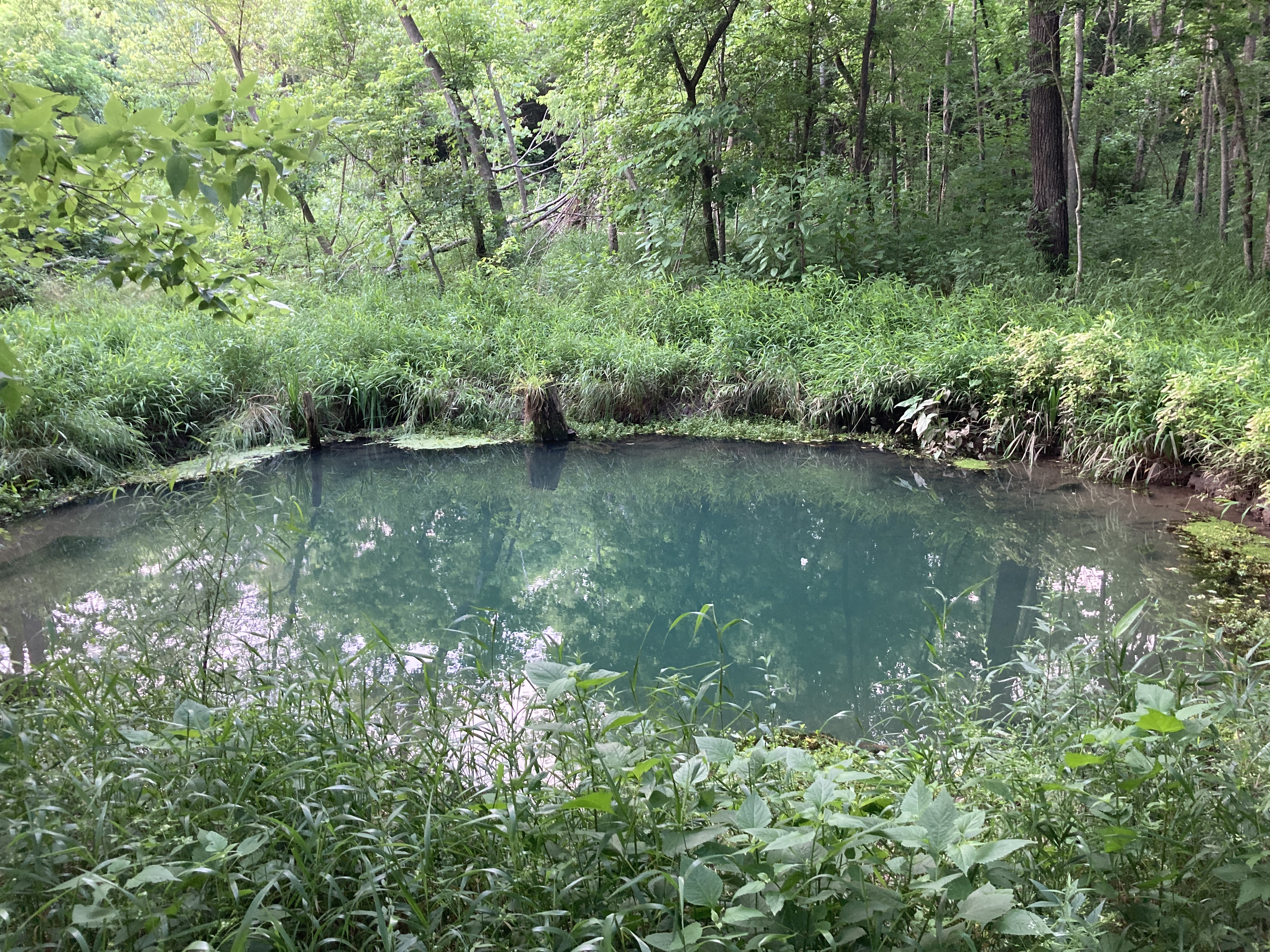
The Blue Hole spring at McConnell Springs in Lexington, Kentucky

McConnell Springs is a twenty-six acre natural park located at the historic springs where the city of Lexington, Kentucky was named. The park is a non-profit organization in partnership with the Lexington-Fayette Urban County Government Division of Parks and Recreation. The mission statement of this organization is to restore and preserve McConnell Springs as a national historic site, an educational resource for culture and environment, and a passive recreational park.

== Natural Landscape ==
McConnell Springs Park is an ecosystem of karst topography. This type of landscape is the result of water dissolving soluble rock, such as limestone, thus creating sinkholes, underground streams, caves, and springs. The most significant environmental feature is a complex system of sinking springs. McConnell Springs is the only known site in Fayette County that has a series of artesian springs that come to the surface, go underground, reappear, flow on the surface and go back underground only to surface again a third of a mile away. About 20% of the United States is underlain with karst landscapes, and 40% of all drinking water comes from karst aquifers.

McConnell Springs has three major natural springs. The first is The Blue Hole, which gets its name due to appearance of the water looking blue. The illusion of the colored water is due to the 15 foot depth of this spring. The second major spring is The Boils. Although some may think that this spring is hot due to its given name, it is not. It gets its name due to the heavy rain water that rushes up from underground which in return makes the spring appear as it is boiling. The last feature is named The Final Sink. All the water from the park flows into this sink hole which then resurfaces at Preston's Cave Spring.

== Historical Significance ==
McConnell Springs is historically and environmentally significant to this area. The naming of Lexington is the central historic event which marked McConnell Springs' place in history. William McConnell and his party of kinsmen, companion surveyors, explorers and would-be settlers established a small camp in this area in June 1775. The group named their camp "Lexington" in honor of one of the first battles of the American Revolutionary War in Lexington, Massachusetts. Four years later this name was adopted when founding their town. In the ensuing years, the McConnell property changed hands several times with remnants of past use still visible throughout the park - including stone fences, a barn foundation, a small rock quarry, remains of an old dam and the foundation of an old creamery. The site became an unused, dilapidated area, used mainly for industrial dumping space. In the early 1990s, the community of Lexington decided to restore McConnell Springs as a historic site and nature education center, leading to the formation on the Friends of McConnell Springs Organization. Debris was removed from the site, and the land was placed into the city park system to be preserved. The Kentucky American Water Nature Center was constructed, and the park was opened to the public in 1994.

== Park Features ==
McConnell Springs also has two miles of trails, with a half-mile paved loop which makes the park accessible to most visitors, as well as an education center.

McConnell Springs park is protected sanctuary by the city of Lexington. It has rules such as no pets and no camping. The water surface quality is also regularly monitored to ensure that the springs are natural and not being contaminated by pollutants.
