= Triangle Park (Lexington) =

Coordinates: 38°02′56″N 84°30′02″W

Triangle Park is a private park built for public use, located at 400 W Main Street in Lexington, Kentucky. The park is currently used as a source of entertainment for local citizens.

== History ==
The park was originally built by the Triangle Foundation in 1981. The Foundation was formed by Mr. Alex Campbell Jr. and a group of community leaders in 1980 with a mission to initiate private projects for public benefit. Today, the Foundation boasts over 100 members whose donations have enabled projects such as Equestrian Park at Blue Grass Airport, Thoroughbred Park and Woodland Skateboard Park, along with several other important community projects.

The park was designed by Robert Zion. Though Mr. Zion was not well known to the public, the parks and public spaces created by his firm, Zion and Breen, are some of New York's most cherished oases. These designs include the Samuel Paley Plaza (better known as Paley Park), the atrium of the I.B.M. Building, the Abby Aldrich Rockefeller Sculpture Garden of the Museum of Modern Art, and the grounds of the Statue of Liberty in New York Harbor.

== Funding ==
Today, the Central Bank Center manages and maintains the park. The park is patrolled by both Lexington police and the security force of the corporation.

== Entertainment ==
The park has a long series of fountains along one side of its triangle shape. In the summer, locals are able to enjoy the provided outdoor seating, can bring pets so long as they are on a leash, and enjoy local events. In the winter, the park is sometimes turned into an ice rink.
