= Darb-e Kahat =

Village in Kerman province, Iran

Darb-e Kahat درب كهت
- Village
- Interactive map of Darb-e Kahat
- Country: Iran
- Province: Kerman
- County: Shahr-e Babak
- Bakhsh: Dehaj
- Rural District: Dehaj

Population (2006)
  - Total: 11
- Time zone: UTC+3:30 (IRST)
  - Summer (DST): UTC+4:30 (IRDT)

Darb-e Kahat (Persian: درب كهت) is a village in Dehaj Rural District, Dehaj District, Shahr-e Babak County, Kerman Province, Iran. At the 2006 census, its population was 11, in 4 families.
