= Kabat numbering scheme =

Biological scheme on numbering amino acids

The Kabat numbering scheme is a scheme for the numbering of amino acid residues in antibodies based upon variable regions. The scheme is useful when comparing these variable regions between antibodies. Its foundations were laid by the American biomedical scientist Elvin A. Kabat, who started collecting and aligning amino acid sequences of human and mouse Bence Jones proteins and immunoglobulin light chains in 1969.

Another numbering scheme is the Chothia numbering system.

== History ==
The basis for the Kabat numbering scheme was laid out by a 1970s paper aligning 77 Bence Jones protein sequences. This analysis showed signals of "10 invariant and almost invariant glycines" as well as signals of hypervariable regions. Kabat produced the first numbering scheme in 1970.

The KabatMan (Kabat Sequence Database) is a database collecting antibody sequences.
