= Kaht =

Kaht كهت
- Village
- Location within Iran
- Coordinates: 28°43′24″N 56°19′43″E
- Country: Iran
- Province: Kerman
- County: Baft
- Bakhsh: Central
- Rural District: Khabar

Population (2006)
  - Total: 44
- Time zone: UTC+3:30 (IRST)
  - Summer (DST): UTC+4:30 (IRDT)

Kaht (Persian: كهت, also Romanized as Kahat; also known as Kabat) is a village in Khabar Rural District, in the Central District of Baft County, Kerman Province, Iran. At the 2006 census, its population was 44, in 14 families.
