= Qobad =

Qobad قباد
- Village
- Location within Iran
- Coordinates: 34°02′15″N 46°42′32″E
- Country: Iran
- Province: Kermanshah
- County: Eslamabad-e Gharb
- Bakhsh: Central
- Rural District: Shiyan

Population (2006)
  - Total: 515
- Time zone: UTC+3:30 (IRST)
  - Summer (DST): UTC+4:30 (IRDT)

Qobad (Persian: قباد, also Romanized as Qobād; also known as Akbar Qobād, Kabāt, Koāi, and Qobād-e Shīān) is a village in Shiyan Rural District, in the Central District of Eslamabad-e Gharb County, Kermanshah Province, Iran. At the 2006 census, its population was 515, in 111 families.
