= Asthma and Allergy Foundation of America =

U.S. nonprofit organization

- Abbreviation: AAFA
- Formation: 1953
- Type: Nonprofit organization
- Headquarters: Arlington, Virginia
- Board Chair: Ritesh Patel
- President and CEO: Kenneth Mendez
- Website: aafa.org

The Asthma and Allergy Foundation of America (AAFA) is a patient community organization for people with asthma and allergies. It is the oldest asthma and allergy patient group in the world. Through research, education, advocacy, and support, AAFA's focus is on improving and saving the lives of people with asthma, allergies, and related conditions.

AAFA offers support for individuals and families affected by asthma and allergic diseases, such as food allergies and atopic dermatitis (eczema). Through its online patient support communities, network of regional chapters, and collaborations with community-based groups, AAFA empowers patients and their families by providing practical, evidence-based information and community programs and services. AAFA is the only asthma and allergy patient advocacy group that is certified to meet the standards of excellence set by the National Health Council. This certification is given to reliable patient groups that practice high standards of accountability and ethics.

== History ==
AAFA was founded in 1953 by three allergists in New York who were looking to create a group to raise money for educational activities and asthma and allergy research. In the 1980s and 1990s, AAFA changed to a patient-centered group and moved to Washington, D.C., to make a national impact and support government-backed research of allergies and immune diseases. In 2013, AAFA merged with Kids with Food Allergies (KFA) to also support families of children with food allergies.

AAFA is a not-for-profit, tax-exempt 501(c)(3) charitable organization. AAFA receives financial support through individual giving and fundraising, federal agencies, pharmaceutical support, corporate support, and the asthma & allergy friendly Certification Program. These vital stakeholders provide funding for AAFA's research, advocate for change, and provide programs and services to people living with asthma and allergies.

== AAFA's Pillars of Service ==
AAFA focuses on four main programmatic areas to achieve its mission to save lives and reduce the burden of asthma and allergic diseases.

Education

AAFA offers many educational programs and tools including programs for patients, caregivers, and health care providers, printed and digital educational material, digital tools, online resources and courses, newsletters and magazines, and resources and tools in Spanish. AAFA has designated the month of May for National Asthma and Allergy Awareness.

Advocacy

AAFA supports public policies that will benefit people with asthma and allergies. AAFA's key policy issues include access to health care and medications, climate and health, food allergies, healthy settings, health disparities and promoting health equity, and federal funding for policies and programs that benefit people with asthma and allergies.

Research

AAFA conducts and promotes research for asthma and allergic diseases. Through research, AAFA aims to gain a greater understanding of these diseases, develop improved treatments, help search for cures, support advanced training in allergy and immunology, and improve patient involvement in research. AAFA's research projects aim to better understand the needs of people with these diseases and find out how behaviors relate to asthma and allergy prevention and treatment.

AAFA's research and reports include annual Allergy Capitals and Asthma Capitals reports and the Asthma Disparities in America report.

Community Support

AAFA has four regional chapters in Alaska, Michigan, New England, and St. Louis that provide services, programs, and support. AAFA's chapters work with volunteers, health care providers, and local government leaders. AAFA also has educational support groups across the United States to offer emotional support and information about asthma and allergies.

AAFA offers online patient-support communities for people with asthma, allergies, and other allergic diseases; and for people with food allergies through KFA.
