= Charles Surh =

South Korean biochemist (1961–2017)

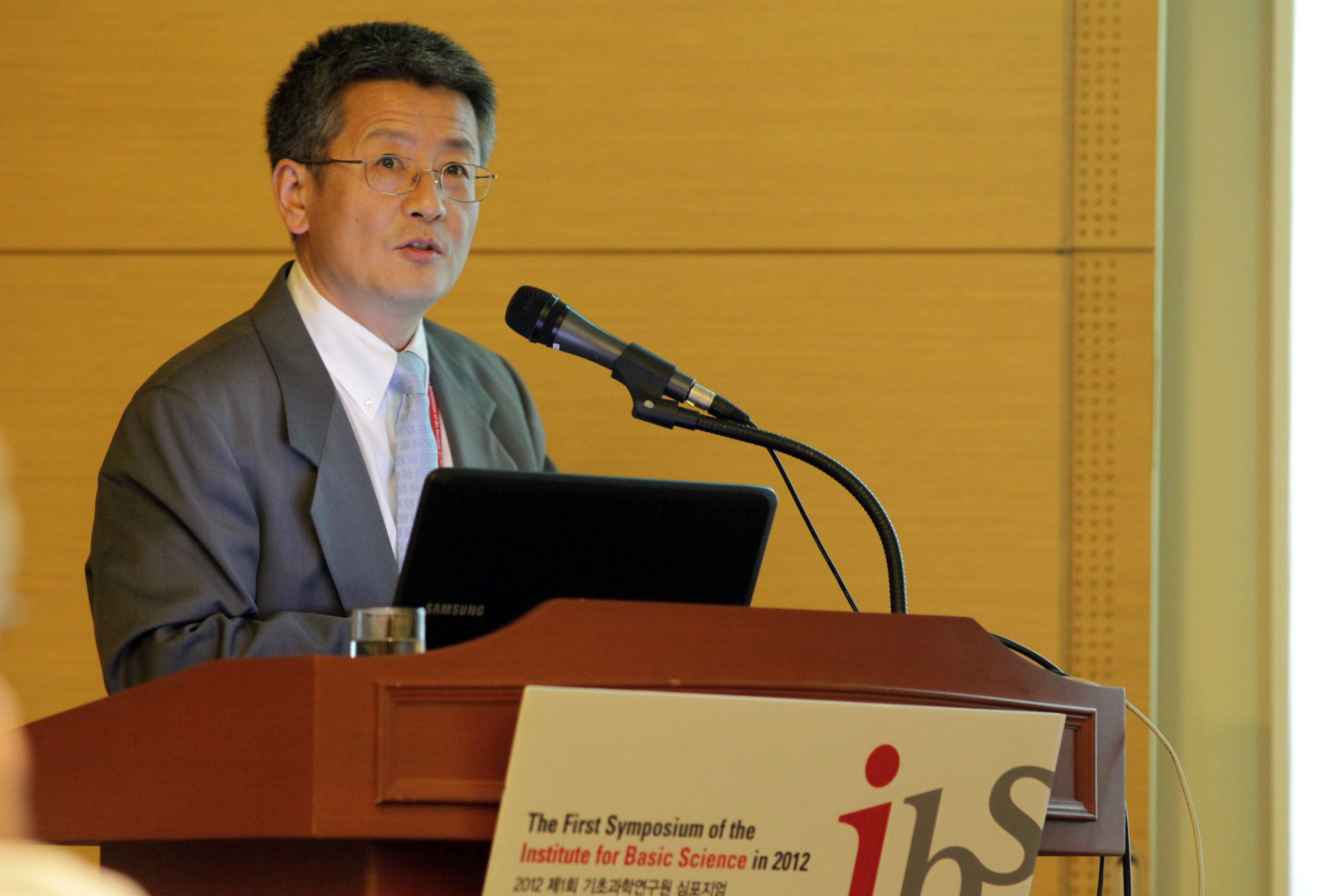
- Born: 서동철; 1961; Seoul, South Korea
- Died: 7 October 2017 (aged 55–56); San Diego, US
- Education: University of California, San Diego, University of California, Davis
- Awards: Ho-Am Prize in Medicine, 100 Leaders in Korea, Scientist of the Year Award
- Scientific career
- Fields: Memory T cells, naïve T cells, immune system, microbiota
- Workplaces: The Scripps Research Institute, Pohang University of Science and Technology, Institute for Basic Science, La Jolla Institute for Immunology

Korean name
- Hangul: 서동철
- RR: Seo Dongcheol
- MR: Sŏ Tongch'ŏl
- Website: Academy of Immunology and Microbiology

Charles D. Surh (Korean: 서동철; 1961 – 7 October 2017) was a leading scientist in the field of immunology. He was a professor at both The Scripps Research Institute and Pohang University of Science and Technology (POSTECH), director of the Academy of Immunology and Microbiology in Pohang, and associate editor of the journal Pleura and Peritoneum. He died from cancer in 2017.

== Early life and education ==
Charles majored in biochemistry at the University of California, San Diego for his undergrad graduating in 1983. He then went to the University of California, Davis, where he obtained his Ph.D. in immunology in 1989. He research topic was on target antigens for autoantibody formation associated with primary biliary cirrhosis.

== Career ==
Working as a postdoc at The Scripps Research Institute in the Department of Immunology, he researched T cells focusing on the function and structure thymus and the physiology and lifespan of mature T cells. Staying at Scripps, he became an assistant professor, associate professor, gained tenure, and then a full professor. In 2009, the Korean government recruited him as part of their World Class University (WCU) program. He worked as a WCU professor in the Division of Integrative Bioscience and Biotechnology, POSTECH

From 2012 until his death in 2017, he worked as an adjunct professor in both the Department of Immunology at The Scripps Research Institute and also in the Division of Development Immunology at the La Jolla Institute for Immunology. He also started a professorship at the Division of Integrative Bioscience and Biotechnology in POSTECH. Also within POSTECH, he was the founding and only director of the Academy of Immunology and Microbiology (AIM) for the Institute for Basic Science (IBS). The Academy researched chronic diseases of the immune system with the "belief that a significant proportion of the chronic diseases arise from aberrant interactions between the host's immune systems with the components of the diet as well as with the commensal microbes that co-exist with the host." After failing to find a suitable replacement, AIM closed in October 2019.

== Death ==
Diagnosed with cancer in early 2015, he continued his research while receiving treatment. He succumbed to the disease on October 7, 2017 in San Diego, U.S.

== Awards and honors ==
- 2017: (posthumous) Scientist of the Year Award, Korea Science Journalists Association
- 2010: 100 Leaders in Korea, The Dong-A Ilbo
- 2007: Ho-Am Prize in Medicine, Ho-Am Foundation
- 1999–2004: Scholar, Leukemia & Lymphoma Society
- 1993–1996: Special Fellow, Leukemia & Lymphoma Society
- 1988–1989: Member, Biological Science Council, University of California, Davis
- 1988: Student Research Prize, 39th Annual Meeting of the American Association for the Study of Liver Disease

== Selected publications ==
1. Kaech, Susan M.; Tan, Joyce T.; Wherry, E. John; Konieczny, Bogumila T.; Surh, Charles D.; Ahmed, Rafi (16 November 2003). "Selective expression of the interleukin 7 receptor identifies effector CD8 T cells that give rise to long-lived memory cells". Nature Immunology. 4 (12): 1191–1198. doi:10.1038/ni1009. PMID 14625547. S2CID 8178667.
2. Surh, Charles D.; Sprent, Jonathan (3 November 1994). "T-cell apoptosis detected in situ during positive and negative selection in the thymu". Nature. 372 (6501): 100–103. Bibcode:1994Natur.372..100S. doi:10.1038/372100a0. PMID 7969401. S2CID 4350111.
3. Surh, Charles D.; Sprent, Jonathan (19 December 2008). "Homeostasis of Naive and Memory T Cells". Immunity. 29 (6): 848–862. doi:10.1016/j.immuni.2008.11.002. PMID 19100699.
4. Tan, Joyce T.; Dudl, Eric; LeRoy, Eric; Murray, Richard; Sprent, Jonathan; Weinberg, Kenneth I.; Surh, Charles D. (17 July 2001). "IL-7 is critical for homeostatic proliferation and survival of naïve T cells". PNAS. 98 (15): 8732–8737. Bibcode:2001PNAS...98.8732T. doi:10.1073/pnas.161126098. PMC 37504. PMID 11447288.
5. Tan, Joyce T.; Ernst, Bettina; Kieper, William C.; LeRoy, Eric; Sprent, Jonathan; Surh, Charles D. (17 June 2002). "Interleukin (IL)-15 and IL-7 Jointly Regulate Homeostatic Proliferation of Memory Phenotype CD8+ Cells but Are Not Required for Memory Phenotype CD4+ Cells". J Exp Med. 195 (12): 1523–1532. doi:10.1084/jem.20020066. PMC 2193564. PMID 12070280.

== See also ==
- Jared Purton
