= WTO/FTA Moot =

Annual competition in South Korea

WTO/FTA Moot (Asian WTO Moot)
- Established: 2010 (2015 for international rounds)
- Venue: Seoul
- Subject matter: International trade law
- Class: Regional
- Record participation: 16 teams (2015)
- Qualification: Written submissions
- Most championships: Seoul National University (2)
- Website: https://yonseiuiclawreview.wordpress.com/wtofta-moot-court-competition/

The WTO-FTA Moot or Asian WTO Moot is an annual international moot court competition that began in 2010. Hosted in Seoul, the competition is sponsored by the South Korean Ministry of Trade, Energy, and Trade and the Korean Society of International Economic Law. Judges in the competition include members of the Appellate Body of the World Trade Organization. Teams have to go through two preliminary rounds before the top eight teams by score advance to the first round of knockouts. The competition mainly comprises Korean teams, but since 2015 foreign schools have been invited to participate every year.

== Competition records ==
Year	Total number of teams	Number of teams at international rounds	Champion	Runner-up	Semi-finalists	Quarter-finalists	Best Oralist in Final	Best Oralist in Semi-Final
2018	NA	NA	NA	NA	NA	NA	NA	NA
2017	35	16	Seoul National University	Thammasat University	* Chinese University of Hong Kong * National University of Singapore		Thammasat University	National University of Singapore
2015	22	16	Singapore Management University	Korea University	* Handong Global University * National Taiwan University		Singapore Management University	Singapore Management University
2014		NA						
2013		NA	Handong Global University					
2012		NA						
2011		NA						
2010		NA	Seoul National University					
