= Scientist of the Year Award =

South Korean annual award

- Awarded for: Scientists in recognition of their scientific excellence and their contributions to the development of science in Korea
- Country: South Korea
- Presented by: Korea Science Journalists Association
- First award: 1985
- Website: Scientist of the Year Award

- Scientist of the Year Award
- Hangul: 올해의 과학자상
- Hanja: 올해의 科學者賞
- Revised Romanization: Olhaeui gwahakjasang
- McCune–Reischauer: Orhaeŭi kwahakchasang

Scientist of the Year Award (Korean: 올해의 과학자상) is one of several awards given in South Korea by the Korea Science Journalists Association. From 1985, it was awarded to one individual. From 1999, it was given to three winners, each within their own category, which changed to one category and one winner in 1996, removed the category system from 2011, and allowed multiple winners the following year. Laureates receive a medal and 3 million KRW (roughly US$3,000) cash prize.

Other awards given by the Association include the Korea Science Journalist Award, Korea Medical Scholarship Award, Korean Medical Science Award, and Contribution Award for Science and Medicine PR.

== Laureates ==
Spelling of laureates' names matches their Wikipedia page, if it exists, the remainder uses Revised Romanization of Korean. Job position and institution information are from the Korea Science Journalists Association's website.

Year	Scientist of the Year	Position (if stated) and institution
1985	Yun Hansik (윤한식)	Senior researcher, KAIST
1986	Lee Wonyeong (이원영)	Professor, College of Medicine, Yonsei University
1987	Kim Young-gil (김영길)	KAIST
1988	Park Jong-sei (박종세)	Director, Olympic Doping Control Center
1989	Bak Sangcheol (박상철)	College of Medicine, Seoul National University
1990	Hong Jubong (홍주봉)	Genetic Engineering Research Institute, Korea Institute of Science and Technology
1991	Lee Jinhyo (이진효)	Electronics and Telecommunications Research Institute
1992	Kim Sutae (김수태)	Seoul National University
1993	Bak Geonyu (박건유)	Korea Institute of Science and Technology
1994	Lee Dongyeong (이동영)	Professor, Department of Physics, POSTECH
1995	–	–
1996	Chon Kilnam (전길남)	Professor, Department of Computer Science, KAIST
1997	Gwon Odae (권오대)	Professor, Dept. of Electrical and Electronic Engineering, POSTECH
1998	Ihm Jisoon (임지순)	Professor, Department of Physics, Seoul National University
1999	Lee Hyeoncheol (이현철); Ahn Cheol-soo (안철수); Hwang Woo-suk (황우석)	Yonsei University Medical College; Director, AhnLab, Inc. Professor, College of Veterinary Medicine, Seoul National University
2000	Bak Byeongyeop (박병엽); Lee Yeonguk (이영욱)	Vice Chairman, Pantech (팬택); Professor of Astronomy and Space Science, Yonsei University
2001	Lee Hyeoncheol (이현철); Lee Gitae (이기태); Ryu Seongeon (류성언)	Medical College, Yonsei University; Samsung; Korea Research Institute of Bioscience and Biotechnology
2002	Bak Gwiwon (박귀원); Lee Gyeongju (이경주); Bae Seokcheol (배석철)	Professor, Seoul National University; President, KTF; Professor, Chungbuk National University
2003	Jo Yunae (조윤애); No Yongman (노용만); Jo Junmyeong (조준명)	Professor, Anam Hospital, Korea University; Professor, Korea Information and Communication University; Crystal Genomics (크리스탈지노믹스)
2004	Song Jaehun (송재훈); Gwon Suncheol (권순철); Lee Sangyeol (이상열)	Professor, Sungkyunkwan University; Managing director, KT Corporation; Professor, Gyeongsang National University
2005	Kim Gyeonggyu (김경규); Kim Yanggyun (김양균); Kim Donguk (김동욱)	School of Science, Sungkyunkwan University; College of Medicine, Chung-Ang University; College of Medicine, Catholic University of Korea
2006	Lee Sangyeop (이상엽)	Professor, Dept. of Biotechnology, KAIST
2007	Lee Jio (이지오)	KAIST
2008	Seo Yeongjun (서영준)	College of Pharmacy, Seoul National University
2009	Jang Gyutae (장규태)	National Primate Center, Korea Research Institute of Bioscience and Biotechnology
2010	Park Jong Oh (박종오)	Director, Robot Research Institute, Chonnam National University
2011	Bak Wancheol (박완철)	Korea Institute of Science and Technology
2012	Choe Honam (최호남); Han Donggeun (한동근); Kim Jongyeol (김종열); Kim Segwang (김세광)	Head of Information Service Center, Korea Institute of Science and Technology Information; Biomaterial Research Center, Korea Institute of Science and Technology; Director, Policy Research Center, Korea Institute of Oriental Medicine; Foundry Technology Center, Korea Institute of Industrial Technology
2013	Park Jong Oh (박종오); Lee Sangyeop (이상엽); Min Gyeongchan (민경찬); Kim Seunghwan (김승환); Seo Gapyang (posthumous) (서갑양); Gang Gwanhyeong (posthumous) (강관형)	Professor, Chonnam National University; Professor, KAIST; Professor of Mathematics, Yonsei University; Professor, POSTECH; Seoul National University; POSTECH
2014	Lee Yungnam (이융남); Bak Hyeongju (박형주); Seong Yeongcheol (성영철)	Director, Korea Institute of Geoscience and Mineral Resources; Professor of Mathematics, POSTECH; Professor, Department of Life Convergence, POSTECH
2015	Kim Jin-soo (김진수); Oh Junho (오준호); Bang Yeongju (방영주)	Director, Center for Genome Engineering, Institute for Basic Science, & Professor, Department of Chemistry, Seoul National University; Professor of Mechanical Engineering, KAIST; Professor, College of Medicine, Seoul National University
2016	Kim V. Narry (김빛내리); Han Hoseong (한호성); Hong Taegyeong (홍태경)	Director, Center for RNA Research, Institute for Basic Science, & Professor, School of Life Sciences, Seoul National University; Professor, Seoul National University Bundang Hospital; Professor, Department of Earth System Science, Yonsei University
2017	Im Myeongsin (임명신); Charles Surh (posthumous) (찰스서); Korean Gravitational Wave Group (한국중력파연구협력단)	Professor, Seoul National University; Director, Academy of Immunology and Microbiology, Institute for Basic Science; Korean Gravitational Wave Group
2018	Axel Timmermann (악셀 팀머만); Nam-Gyu Park (박남규); Korea Aerospace Research Institute (한국항공우주연구원)	Director, Center for Climate Physics, Institute for Basic Science; Professor, School of Chemical Engineering, Sungkyunkwan University; Korea Aerospace Research Institute
2019	Kim Ildu (김일두); Inhee Mook-Jung (묵인희); Lee Jinhan (이진한)	Professor of Advanced Materials Engineering, KAIST; Professor, Department of Biochemistry, Seoul National University College of Medicine; Professor, Department of Earth and Environmental Sciences, Korea University
2020	Koh Gou Young (고규영); Kim Beomtae (김범태); Jang Hyesik (장혜식)	Director, Center for Vascular Research, Institute for Basic Science; Director, Convergence Research Center, Korea Research Institute of Chemical Technology; Professor, Department of Life Sciences, Seoul National University
2021	Seok Sangil (석상일); Lee Juni (이준이); Choe Jaeuk (최재욱); Hong Jeongju (홍정주)	Professor, Ulsan National Institute of Science and Technology; Professor, Pusan National University, Climate & Atmospheric Dynamics Lab; Professor, Korea University, Department of Preventative Medicine; Senior researcher, Korea Research Institute of Bioscience and Biotechnology, National Primate Center
2022	Ko Jeonghwan (고정환); Jeong Sujong (정수종); Huh June (허준이)	Director, Korea Launch Vehicle Development Project, Korea Aerospace Research Institute; Professor, Department of Environmental Planning, Graduate School of Environmental Studies, Seoul National University; Professor of mathematics, Princeton University and distinguished professor of mathematics, Korea Institute for Advanced Study
2023	Kim Hail (김하일); Seon Yangguk (선양국); Han Sanguk (한상욱)	Professor, Graduate School of Medical Science, KAIST; Professor, Department of Energy Engineering, Hanyang University; Director, Quantum Information Research Group, Korea Institute of Science and Technology
2024	Kim Changyeong (김창영); Baek Mingyeong (백민경); Jo Ilju (조일주)	Professor, Department of Physics and Astronomy, Seoul National University; Professor, Department of Life Sciences, Seoul National University; Professor, College of Medicine, Korea University
2025	Kim Baek-min (김백민); Kim Jae Kyoung (김재경); Park Ki-deok (박기덕)	Professor, College of Environment and Ocean Science, Pukyong National University; CI, Biomedical Mathematics Group, Institute for Basic Science / Professor, Department of Mathematical Sciences, KAIST; Director, Brain Science Research Institute, Korea Institute of Science and Technology
