= Charlie Teo =

Australian neurosurgeon (born 1957)

Charlie Teo AM
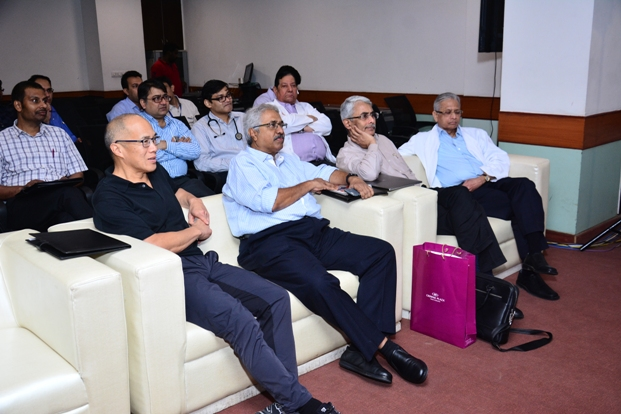
- Teo (foreground, left) in 2018
- Born: Charles Teo; 24 December 1957 (age 68); Sydney, New South Wales, Australia
- Education: The Scots College
- Alma mater: University of New South Wales
- Occupation: Neurosurgeon
- Years active: 1981–present
- Spouse: Genevieve Teo (née Agnew) (sep. 2018)
- Partner: Traci Griffiths
- Children: 4

Charles Teo AM (Chinese: 張正賢; born 24 December 1957) is an Australian neurosurgeon.

== Early life and education ==
Teo was born to Chinese-Singaporean parents who immigrated to Australia. He attended The Scots College and the University of New South Wales, graduating with a Bachelor of Medicine, Bachelor of Surgery in 1981.

== Career ==
Charlie Teo started in general neurosurgery at Royal Prince Alfred Hospital before moving to the United States. He completed a fellowship in Dallas, Texas, where he became the only Australian neurosurgeon certified by a US medical board. Teo spent almost ten years in the United States where he was an associate professor of neurosurgery and chief of pediatric neurosurgery at the Arkansas Children's Hospital. He initially avoided neurosurgery, which he found to be a "very unforgiving specialty". He began his career in pediatric surgery before, as he described it, being "thrust into neurosurgery" after being asked to cover the duties of a colleague who had fallen ill.

Upon his return to Australia, he was self-appointed as the director of the Centre for Minimally Invasive Neurosurgery which he established at the Prince of Wales Hospital, and is the founder of Cure Brain Cancer Foundation (formerly Cure For Life Foundation), and the founder of the Charlie Teo Foundation.

Over the course of his career, Teo developed an international reputation in the field of minimally-invasive (or 'keyhole') neurosurgery. Teo has been an invited speaker and visiting professor in more than thirty-five countries, associated with institutions such as Johns Hopkins University, Stanford University, Albert Einstein University, Marburg University and the Barrow Neurological Institute in Phoenix, Arizona. Teo has written more than thirty book chapters and numerous scholarly papers. While still teaching regularly in the US, he also teaches and sponsors the education of neurosurgeons from developing countries, including Peru, Vietnam, Bangladesh, and Romania; and he treats children from developing countries with neurological conditions.

Some elements of the media have claimed Teo has worked miracles. Notable patients of Teo include Jane McGrath, Dr Chris O'Brien, and Stan Zemanek. Author Susan Wyndham detailed a story about Teo and the pianist Aaron McMillan, a patient, in her biography, Life in his Hands. Sally White, a patient of Teo's, wrote of her experiences in Three Quotes From A Plumber: How a Second Opinion Changed the Life of a Woman with a Brain Tumour. Teo was featured in several TV programs including the ABC's Q&A, Good Medicine, 60 Minutes, Last Chance Surgery, Australian Story, Enough Rope and Anh's Brush with Fame. The 'Reader's Digest Most Trusted Australian' was an annual trust survey, where participants rated their level of trust of a high-profile Australian out of 10. Teo appeared first or in the Top 5 for several years; and was rated most trusted Australian in 2012, 2013, and 2014.

In 2011, Teo was appointed a Member of the Order of Australia for service to medicine as a neurosurgeon through the introduction of minimally invasive techniques, as a researcher, educator and mentor, and through the establishment of the Cure for Life Foundation. Teo gave the 50th Anniversary Errol Solomon Meyers Memorial Lecture at the University of Queensland in August 2007. Teo gave the 2012 Australia Day speech on 23 January 2012.

== Legal issues ==
In May 2019, controversy arose when a prominent Australian urologist, Professor Henry Woo, commented on the large number of GoFundMe campaigns requesting considerable sums of money for patients to have surgery done by Teo when Australia's public health system should be performing any required surgery in the public system. Professor Woo also questioned the absence of peer-reviewed evidence that Teo's operative approach was beneficial to patients with incurable brain cancer.

In 2021, the NSW Medical Council conducted a special hearing into Teo's behaviours during surgical procedures; and, following investigation, he was prevented from performing any "recurrent malignant intracranial tumour and brain stem tumour surgical procedures" unless he obtained written approval from an independent neurosurgeon, as approved by the NSW Medical Council. Teo was also investigated by the Health Care Complaints Commission. After a lengthy investigation by the commission, Teo appeared before a hearing in September 2022. In July 2023, the Commission found Teo guilty of unsatisfactory professional conduct, for which he was reprimanded.

In 2022, it was reported that Teo is performing surgeries in Spain, which is beyond the regulatory powers of the NSW Medical Council. On 23 October 2022, the Sydney Morning Herald described how Teo charged families extraordinary amounts of money and gave hope for a cure for ultimately futile operations that have catastrophically injured his patients. The article discussed two cases of operations on children with Diffuse Intrinsic Pontine Glioma (DIPG), an inoperable tumour, which, despite Teo's reassurance to their families that these surgeries could cure DIPG, did not provide a cure. In an interview on A Current Affair, Teo sought to justify his interventions. In a podcast with Mark Bouris, Teo would claim that the accusations being levelled against him are from business rivals and personal enemies. During the hearing, it was reported that Teo slapped a patient who was unconscious in front of the patient's family, while Teo downplayed the intensity of the slap, calling it a light tap through a pantomime. Teo's conduct has been criticised by other Australian neurosurgeons.

Amidst the controversy, a number of neurosurgeons globally, as well as other medical colleagues, supported Teo. In letters of support to the Health Care Complaints Commission, Professor Yeo Tseng Tsai, head of neurosurgery at National University Hospital Singapore lauded Teo as 'a world class neurosurgeon of the first order'. Professor Paul Gardiner, neurosurgery director at University of Pittsburgh Medical Center described Teo as 'among a small set of gifted and dedicated surgeons who can offer the most complicated patients a chance where other (neurosurgeons) cannot'. Dr Robert L. Dodd of Stanford School of Medicine affirmed that Teo's 'skill as a surgeon is superb and his surgical outcomes were extraodinary'. Director of Brain Tumor and Skull Base Surgery at Providence Brain and Spine Institute Dr Gore writes in 'unequivocal support of Dr Charlie Teo ... his heightened skills in handling critical neural and vascular structures and differentiating tumor from non-neoplastic tissue put him in a position to perform surgery that many other neurosurgeons are not capable of'. Professor of Neurosurgery Nikolai J Hopf of University of Mainz, Germany, described Teo as 'one of the most important opinion leaders in the field of glioma surgery... his impact on modern surgical treatment of patients with gliomas and in particular complex gliomas is outstanding...', noting that if Teo's 'registration was suspended, cancelled, or otherwise restricted, patients as well as the Neurosurgical community would lose one of the most skillful glioma surgeons'.

In August 2023, Teo and a former patient reached an out-of-court settlement just prior to a seven-day medical negligence hearing. Teo had operated twice on the patient, who had a grade 3 anaplastic astrocytoma. The patient subsequently lost movement down one side of his body, as well as having visual and cognitive impairment. He has limited life expectancy, possibly less than a year. Teo denied he had been negligent. In approving judgment for the patient, Supreme Court Justice Richard Cavanagh said "the settlement reflects the top of the range for the plaintiff".

In March 2025, Teo agreed to pay an undisclosed settlement amount to the family of a patient who died soon after he operated on her incurable brain tumour. He had previously been found guilty of professional misconduct over the operation in question.

Responding to public criticism of his billing practices, Teo claimed in 2025 that he did not charge "more than half" of his patients during his career, including medical staff, police officers, and pensioners. Following the restrictions placed on his surgical practice in Australia, Teo now travels internationally to countries like Spain to mentor other surgeons, guiding them through operations as a non-participating observer.

== Personal life ==
Teo was married to Genevieve Teo (née Agnew); the couple have four daughters. They separated in 2018. Teo is engaged to former international model, Traci Griffiths. Traci Griffiths was diagnosed with a brain tumour in 2011. Teo was her treating surgeon.

Since 2009, Teo has been a patron of Australian animal welfare group Voiceless.
