= United Nations Academic Impact =

United Nations initiative

UN Academic Impact
- Abbreviation: UNAI
- Formation: 18 November 2010; 14 years ago
- Type: Framework and Mechanism
- Legal status: Active
- Parent organization: UN Department of Public Information, Outreach Division
- Website: un.org/academicimpact

The United Nations Academic Impact, also known by its acronym UNAI, is a United Nations initiative to align institutions of higher education, scholarship and research with the United Nations and with each other.

In the words of former United Nations Secretary-General Ban Ki-moon: "The Academic Impact aims to generate a global movement of minds to promote a new culture of intellectual social responsibility. It is animated by a commitment to certain bedrock principles. Among them: freedom of inquiry, opinion and speech; educational opportunity for all; global citizenship; sustainability; and dialogue."

Furthermore UNAI aims to support the realization of the Sustainable Development Goals focusing on the reciprocal relationship between education and sustainable development.

== History ==
The initiative was formally launched on 18 November 2010 by United Nations Secretary-General Ban Ki-moon at UN Headquarters in New York City. On this occasion, he outlined the purpose of UNAI:

By sharing ideas, across borders and disciplines, we can find solutions to the interconnected problems that cause so much suffering. Climate change is not just an environmental threat; it is closely tied to poverty. Poverty is not just about jobs, it is directly related to food security. Food security affects health. Health affects generations of children. Children hold the key to our future. And education can lead to progress on all these fronts.

As of February 2023, more than 1,500 institutions in over 150 countries and some 40 academic networks are members of the initiative.

== The 10 UNAI principles ==
Academic Impact is informed by a commitment to support and advance ten basic principles:

1. A commitment to the principles inherent in the United Nations Charter as values that education seeks to promote and help fulfill;
2. A commitment to human rights, among them freedom of inquiry, opinion, and speech;
3. A commitment to educational opportunity for all people regardless of gender, race, religion or ethnicity;
4. A commitment to the opportunity for every interested individual to acquire the skills and knowledge necessary for the pursuit of higher education;
5. A commitment to building capacity in higher education systems across the world;
6. A commitment to encouraging global citizenship through education;
7. A commitment to advancing peace and conflict resolution through education;
8. A commitment to addressing issues of poverty through education;
9. A commitment to promoting sustainability through education;
10. A commitment to promoting inter-cultural dialogue and understanding, and the "unlearning" of intolerance, through education.

== In action ==
Participating institutions are expected to show their support of one of the 10 UNAI principles by undertaking one activity per year which tangibly supports and furthers the realization of those principles. Examples include lectures, publications, online activities and especially events that promote intercultural dialogue and the international exchange of ideas. UNAI established various communication channels. In order to get in contact and intensify dialogue with academia around the world UNAI uses social media, such as Facebook and Twitter.

UNAI provides a collaborative platform where members can learn from each other and enhance each other’s skills and tools. UNAI provides information on UN activities and provides guidance on how students, professors and researchers can apply their knowledge to the work of the UN and make a difference in their classrooms, communities and campuses. UNAI uses a number of tools to communicate with its members ranging from social media, including Google hangouts, Twitter town halls and Facebook Live interviews, webinars, podcasts, the publication of research, reports and articles on areas of research that can advance the achievement of the SDGs, newsletters and events such as panel discussions, conferences, workshops, film screenings, and briefings. UNAI also shares information on a wide variety of awards, fellowships, scholarships and contest for students, researchers and academics Ten UNAI members have been designated hubs for each one of the principles.

1. Commitment to the UN Charter: J.F. Oberlin University Japan
2. Human Rights: L’Université Paris 1 Pantheon-Sorbonne, France
3. Education Opportunity For All: Education Above All (EAA), Qatar
4. Higher education opportunity for every interested individual, CETYS Universidad, Mexico
5. Capacity Building in higher education systems: Handong Global University, Republic of Korea
6. Global citizenship, Ana G. Mendez University System, United States
7. Peace and Conflict Resolution: Pomona College, United States
8. Addressing Poverty Dr. Bhanuben Nanavati College of Architecture for Women, India
9. Sustainability: Al Farabi Kazakh University, Kazakhstan
10. Intercultural Dialogue and Understanding and the Unlearning of Intolerance: Currently vacant.

== List of participating institutions ==
For a list of participating institutions, see: UNAI Members, February 2023.

== Literature ==
For more information see the magazine UN Chronicle, Vol XLVII, Nr. 3, 2010 and the textbook "Pathways to Peace—for building a culture of peace" published by J. F. Oberlin University.
