= Errol Solomon Meyers Memorial Lecture =

Annual lecture hosted by the University of Queensland Medical Society

The Errol Solomon Meyers Memorial Lecture (E.S. Meyers Memorial Lecture) is an annual free public Lecture hosted by the University of Queensland Medical Society (UQMS) in Brisbane.

Professor Errol Solomon Meyers was a founding father of the Faculty of Medicine at the University of Queensland, which was established in 1936 after five decades of advocacy for a medical school in Queensland. A pioneer in professional health education in Queensland, Professor Meyers was a leader in postgraduate medical education and undergraduate and postgraduate dental education prior to the establishment of the Faculties of Medicine and Dentistry at the University of Queensland. In July 1957, one year after the death of this founding father, the University of Queensland Medical Society established the E.S. Meyers Memorial Lecture to honour his contributions to medicine in general, and to his role as one of the most significant founders of the Medical School in particular.

As a reflection of the ethos of Professor Meyers’ life, this Memorial Lecture comprises a forum for a person of distinction to present a perspective of endeavour and achievement. Past speakers include biologist Lord Robert Winston, cricketer and politician Mr Imran Khan, Nobel Laureate Professor Peter Doherty, author Lord Jeffrey Archer and mountaineer and diplomat Sir Edmund Hillary.

== Professor Errol Solomon Meyers ==
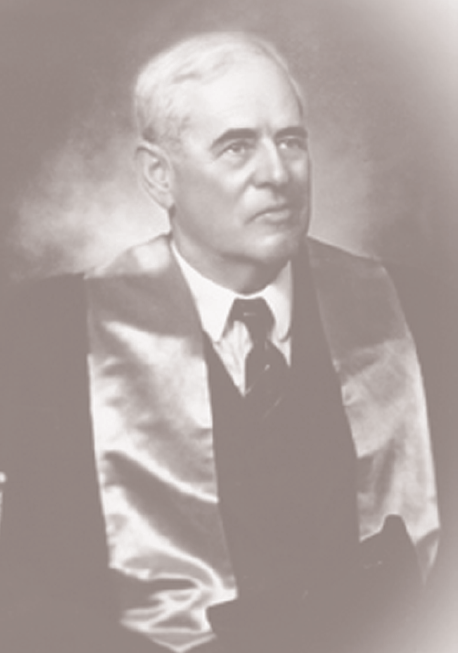
Errol Solomon Meyers

Professor Errol Solomon Meyers was a key founder of the University of Queensland School of Medicine. From 1925, he was a leader in postgraduate medical education courses conducted at the British Medical Association (Queensland Branch), and was the doyen of surgical anatomy. A general surgeon and teacher of outstanding ability, Professor Meyers taught anatomy and surgical dissection to dental students in Brisbane from 1922, establishing an Anatomy School within the dental hospital in George Street in 1927. From that time Dr Meyers brought the strength of his considerable personality to bear on the need to establish a School of Medicine in Queensland, a triumph achieved finally on 13 March 1936.

Education was one of Professor Myers’ passions. Discussions around the need for a medical faculty in Queensland began as early as 1893, and from the mid-1920s Professor Meyers advocated this case strongly. When the Faculty was finally inaugurated in 1936, Professor Meyers was appointed lecturer in anatomy, before becoming Dean in 1941. His standing as a medical educator was such that he was one of only two Australians to be invited to speak at the inaugural World Conference on Medical Education in 1953. Despite all of these accolades, perhaps the best marker of Professor Meyers’ success was his standing within the student body. Professor Meyers exhibited all of the qualities of an exceptional clinical teacher including a passion for education and enthusiasm for learning. He was much loved, admired and respected by the medical student body for his contribution to medical education.

== The Memorial Lecture ==
The Errol Solomon Meyers Memorial Lecture is the premier academic event on the University of Queensland Medical Society’s calendar. The lecture is a tribute to the life of Professor Meyers, and an opportunity to bring together members of the medical, university and general community. The Meyers family and past orators have assisted the ES Meyers Memorial Lecture to become one of the largest public lectures of its kind in the Southern Hemisphere.

== Full List of Orators ==
=== 2020s ===
- 2024 Jana Pittman, "Change the Beat of Your Drum"
- 2023 Joe Brumm, "Creating the Biggest Little Show on Earth"
- 2022 Steven Bradbury, "The Last Man Standing"
- 2021 Dr Vijay Roach, "Mind over Medicine"
- 2020 postponed due to COVID-19 restrictions

=== 2010s ===
- 2019 Professor Alan Duffy, "Sick Astro"
- 2018 Ms Leigh Sales, "Blindsides, resilience and what happens after the worst day of your life"
- 2017 Associate Professor Munjed Al Muderis, "From Iraq to Osseointegration"
- 2016 Ranjana Srivastava, author and oncologist in disadvantaged areas of Melbourne - "Ars longa, vita brevis"
- 2015 Professor Megan Davis, "An International and Domestic Law Perspective on the Health and Wellbeing of Australia’s Aboriginal and Torres Strait Islander People"
- 2014 Mark Loane, "Reflections on 20 Years of Remote Eye health"
- 2013 Nicholas Coatsworth, past President and current Director for Médecins Sans Frontières Australia. Deputy Director of Disaster Preparedness and Response at the National Critical Care and Trauma Response Centre in Darwin - "Unexpected Journeys: From Darfur to Darwin"
- 2012 James Morton, Clinical Haematologist/Oncologist, Mater Private Hospital. Founder of World's Greatest Shave and AEIOU - "Sliding Doors"
- 2011 Michael Kirby, former Justice of the High Court of Australia - "HIV/AIDS and law reform: Desperate need to move mountains"
- 2010 Paul Luckin, Anaesthetist in the Royal Australian Naval Reserve, specialist in Rescue Medicine - Disasters, rescue and retrieval

=== 2000s ===
- 2009 Rowan Gillies, former International Council President of Médecins Sans Frontières Challenges in Humanitarian Assistance
- 2008 Graeme Clark, Founder/Pioneer of the bionic ear. Senior Australian of the Year 2001 The multi-channel cochlear implant; the first clinically successful sensory interface between the world of sound and human consciousness
- 2007 Charles Teo, Australian Neurosurgeon - That which doesn't kill you makes you stronger
- 2006 Fiona Wood, 2005 Australian of the Year, director of the Royal Perth Hospital burns unit and the Western Australia Burns Service - Striving for excellence in health care
- 2005 William P. Schecter, Professor of Clinical Surgery, UCSF Chief of Surgery, San Francisco General Hospital - Terrorist Mass Casualty Events in Israel: Historical Context and Clinical Management
- 2004 Robert C. Gallo, director, Institute of Human Virology, University of Maryland - HIV in the third decade. Lessons from the Past Experiences and Future Prospects
- 2003 Jonathan Sprent, Professor of Immunology, The Scripps Research Institute, California - "T Cells and the Thymus”
- 2002 Alan Trounson "Discussing Embryos and Embryonic Stem Cells: Creating New Medical Directions”
- 2001 Earl Owen, "Microsurgical Reflections, First Hand”
- 2000 Robert Winston, "Will We Still Be Human at the End of the 21st Century?”

=== 1990s ===
- 1999 Mike Toole, Public Health Responses to Humanitarian Crise
- 1998 Karl Kruszelnicki, Great Moments in Science
- 1997 Peter C. Doherty, How We Deal With Viral Infections
- 1996 Grant Sutherland, The Human Genome Project and Medical Practice in the 21st Century
- 1995 Jeffrey Archer It Takes Nineteen Hours a Day to be a Best-seller
- 1994 Imran Khan, From Centuries to Service
- 1993 Gabi Hollows, Vision and Outreach
- 1992 Edmund Hillary, After Everest: Health, Religion and Education in the Himalayas
- 1991 Struan Sutherland, Reflections on Venomous Pursuits
- 1990 Sheila Sherlock, Alcohol and the Liver

=== 1980s ===
- 1989 Neal Blewett, Care, Concern and Conscience
- 1988 Victor Chang, The Australian Heart Transplant Programme – Past Progress and Future Dreams
- 1987 Gustav Nossal, Vision of a New Therapeutic Future
- 1986 Max Lake, The Excitement of Wine
- 1985 David Penington, The Future of Medical Practice in Australia
- 1984 Hiram Baddeley, The Shandong Medical School in China
- 1983 Arthur Guyton, "Hypertension: A Current Analysis”
- 1982 Douglas M Saunders, In Vitro Fertilization
- 1981 Norelle Lickiss, The Quality of Life and Death: The Possibilities and Limits of Medical Practice
- 1980 Louis Opit, Medical Practice in Australia

=== 1970s ===
- 1979 E Parry, Health and Urban Change in Africa
- 1978 N Groots, Autism in Indians: An Unspoken Problem
- 1977 Charles Kerr, Uranium and Health
- 1976 D Llewelly-Jones, Talking Doctors
- 1975 Thomas Szasz
- 1974 W Gillies, China: A Medical Visitor’s Viewpoint
- 1973 P Erbech
- 1972 Dr Bevan
- 1971 H Seeliger, The Development of Social and Preventive Medicine in Western Africa
- 1970 Percy Spender

=== 1960s ===
- 1969 Evan Thomson, Training in Surgery
- 1968 Martin Roth, The Changing Concept of Medical Education
- 1967 M Carseldine, A GP Reminisces
- 1966 D Jackson, Changing Attitudes to Paediatrics over the Last 30 Years
- 1965 T O'Leary, Aerial medical evacuation with special emphasis on the precautions necessary in particular circumstances
- 1964 Konrad Hirschfeld, Some Aspects of Medical Education
- 1963 D Gordon, Memories of Joe
- 1962 WJ Saxton, The Person
- 1961 AE Lee, Voluntary Health Insurance in Australia
- 1960 GAC Douglas

=== 1950s ===
- 1959 FWR Lukin Yesterday, Today and Tomorrow
- 1958 LJJ Nye
- 1957 NG Sutton, Comprehensive Medicine
