= Kim Young-gil =

Korean academic

- Hangul: 김영길
- Hanja: 金泳吉
- RR: Gim Yeonggil
- MR: Kim Yŏnggil

Dr. Young-Gil Kim (born October 3, 1939) founded and chartered Handong Global University in Pohang, Korea in 1995, and he served as its president from 1995 - 2014. Since then, he nurtured HGU to what it is today with his new educational philosophy based on cross-border, multidisciplinary and whole-person education with global perspective commensurate with the 21st century.

== Life ==
Prior to becoming the president of HGU, Dr. Kim was a professor of material science and engineering at the Korea Advanced Institute of Science and Technology (KAIST) for 15 years. While Dr. Kim was in the United States, he worked at NASA-Lewis Research Center (Glenn Research Center) in Cleveland, Ohio, on high-temperature alloys for aerospace applications. He also worked at US Army Construction Engineering Research Laboratory (CERL--U.S. Army Corps of Engineers) at Urbana-Champaign, Illinois, and at the Research and Development Center of the International Nickel Company (INCO), in Suffern, New York.

Due to his scientific achievements in the States, he received NASA-Tech Brief Awards (1976, 1981) and also US Industrial Research "IR-100" award (1981). Since he became the president of HGU, Dr. Kim pioneered a new educational curriculum for this global, technology-driven market place of the 21st century. For those innovative programs, HGU received awards of excellence for education reforms from the Ministry of Education of the Republic of Korea for three consecutive years in 1996–1998 as a model university for 21st century. In 2006, HGU received a grant of US $16 Million, spread over four years, as a part of the "NURI" (New University for Regional Innovation) project for the global education of integrating biotechnology and mechatronics, from the Ministry of Education of the Korean Government. In 1986, Dr. Kim received the King Sejong Award in the field of science & technology from the Korean government, and was selected to receive the Scientist of the Year Award in 1987 in Korea. In 2005, he also received the "Christian Academy Award" for his contribution to Creation Science in Korea. In 2006, Dr. Kim published his autobiography entitled, See the Invisible, Change the World in the USA.

Dr. Kim received a B.S. in metallurgical engineering from Seoul National University, Seoul, Korea, in 1964; an M.S. in metallurgical engineering from the University of Missouri–Rolla in 1969; and a PhD in material science & engineering from Rensselaer Polytechnic Institute, Troy, New York, in 1972. Dr. Kim also received a PhD in International Management Honoris Causa from the Institute of Finance and Economics (IFE) of Mongolia in 2003.

Dr. Young-Gil Kim served as a member of the Advisory Commission for International Higher Education to the President of the Council for Christian Colleges and Universities (CCCU) in Washington, D.C.
