= Robot research initiative =

South Korean research institute

Robot Research Initiative(RRI)
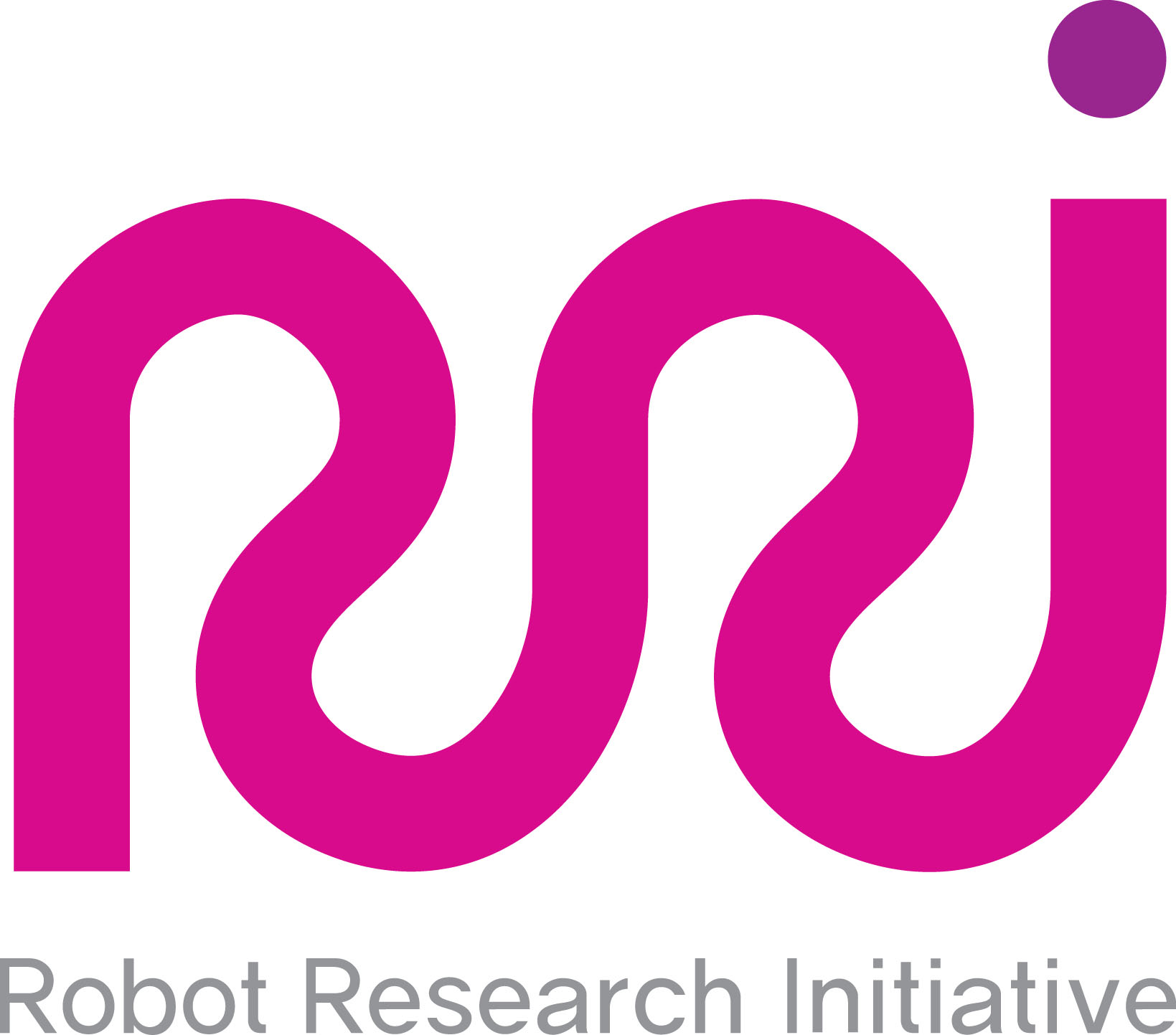
- Native name: 전남대학교 로봇연구소
- Type: Affiliated organization of Chonnam National University
- Industry: Research and development Engineering; Science; Robotics
- Founded: 2008
- Headquarters: Gwangju, South Korea
- Key people: Prof. Jong Oh Park (Director); Prof. Sukho Park; Prof. Seong-young Ko
- Number of employees: ~50
- Divisions: Chiefs, Administration(Executive Office), Steering Committee, Advisory Committee, Research Groups
- Website: www.rri.re.kr

Robot Research Initiative (RRI) is a research institute dedicated to advanced robotics research. It is an affiliated organization of Chonnam National University in Gwangju, Republic of Korea. Prof. Jong Oh Park moved from the Korea Institute of Science and Technology to Chonnam National University in early 2005 and established RRI in March 2008, where he is still actively in charge. RRI is currently a leading institute in the medical robotics field, especially in the area of biomedical micro/nano robotics. RRI is one of the largest institutions among university robotics laboratories in Korea and competes globally.

The current research focuses of RRI are biomedical micro/nano robotics, surgery robotics, cable robotics, and so on. The Korean government invests roughly 200 million USD annually in the Korean robotics industry, and almost 90% of this budget is designated for R&D. RRI has been actively involved in the government-funded R&D projects. After an over 10-year investment in personal service robotics, as well as IT–based ubiquitous robotics, the government has been strategically investing in medical robotics for the past 6 years. The biomedical micro/nano robotics field in Korea has been exclusively initiated by RRI, and the reputation and status of RRI is currently stable.

The global networking of RRI is mostly focused on biomedical micro/nano robotics, covering engineering and scientific approaches. Prof. Park and his staff have led both government- and industry-funded R&D robotics projects. As the industry partners Samsung Electronics, Hyundai Motors, Daewoo Motors, and DSME.

== History ==
The Robot Research Initiative was established at the building of engineering 1A, Chonnam National University in March 2008. As a director of the Robot Research Initiative, Professor Jong Oh Park was nominated a month later.
In year 2008, Robot Research Initiative signed MOU for mutual cooperation with KIST Europe, Dario Lab in Scuola Superior Sant’Anna in Italy and Sitti Lab in Carnegie Mellon University. In year 2010, Robot Research Initiative announced ‘Development of Biomedical Microrobot for Intravascular Therapy'’ to the public. Also, ‘Pioneer research center for bacteriobot’ and ‘Space Robot Research Center’ was opened. As of March 2011, Prof. Jong Oh Park signed MOU for mutual cooperation with centern for Micro-Nano Mechatronics, Nagoya University(CMM), Japan and Fondazione Instituto Italiano di Tecnologia(IIT). In year 2012, MOU for mutual cooperation was signed with Fraunhofer-Gesellschaft and Fraunhofer-IPA, and with National Science Foundation-founded Materials Research Science and Engineering Centre of Brandeis University. Also, March 2013, MOU with Yanbian University of Science&Technology(Mechanical Material Automation Engineering) was made. In June, Cooperation agreement with Fraunhofer-Gesellschaft and Fraunhofer-IPA was made as well a year later of its MOU. Recently, Robot Research Initiative signed MOU with Daewoo Shipbuilding & Marine Enhoneeting Co., LTD. in April, 2014.

== Laboratories ==
- Intravascular therapeutic Microbot Lab - Microrobot moving controlled through blood vessel for drug delivery and treatment of coronary artery disease such as CTO(chronic total occlusion) and thrombus. The lab achieved the world's first microrobot navigation through artery in a live pig.
- Bacteria-based Biomedical Microbot Lab - Development of the fundamental technology for intelligent theragnostic bacteria-based microrobot.(Using bacteria with the abilities such as active movement, fluorescence expression, recombination and replication)
- Telesurgical robot for brain surgery Lab - Development of an Articulated multi-DOF Manipulator for Minimal Invasive Surgery.(Master and Slave System with force reflection control & image guided surgical robot system)
- Robotic Couch for Heavy Ion Therapy Lab - Development of a Novel Robotic Couch System to adjust Patient's position to treat using Heavy Ion Therapy. (An articulated robotic arm to carry a human & respiration synchronization method)
- Surgeon-Robot Interaction for Bone-Fracture Reposition Robot Lab - Robotic Assistant Robot for Bone-Fracture Reposition Surgery, which replaces assistant surgeons who align the broken bone to reduce their exposure to X-ray and labor-intensive work. Surgeon-robot interaction method including an interactive mode and a remote mode will be developed and integrated into the robotic system.
- Cable Robotics Lab - The establishment of Fraunhofer-IPA, one of the Europe's largest robotics institutes, is expected to facilitate the technical improvement through the collaboration in intelligent robotics. The research topic is “development of core and application technologies on high dynamic parallel cable robotics.”

== Technology Transfer ==
Prof. Jong Oh Park, director of RRI, transferred following technologies when he worked at KIST.

- Automatic Inserting robot system for irregular-shape parts : This robot was applied to the factory production line on Samsung Electronics in Gumi in 1992. Awarded IR52 Jang-Yongsil Sang winner of 36th week in 1991. Jong Oh Park won the grandprix of Jeong Jin Ki Sang in the science and technology field in 1992 with this invention.
- Automatic Grinding Robot for molds : This technology was developed in 1993, then transferred and sold to Hwa Cheon Co. from 1995 as model name of MIDAS. It contains creative system with non-directional behavior.
- Automatic Grinding Robot system for Metal Faucets : It is an automatic system grinding the sophisticated 3D shape of faucet developed in 1994. As the world's first application in production line, it was applied to the production line of Yujin Metal co. from 1994.
- Automatic Robot Programming modules : This robot traces the men's moving and saves the traces automatically using F/T sensor. It was developed in 1995 and transferred to the assembly class in Hyunday Automation Co.
- Intelligent Robot for Chassis Machinings : As an initiative work without any precedence in the developed countries, this technology was transferred to Hyundai motors Co. in 1997 and operated on the production line of Daewoo Motor in Bupyung from 1997.
- Intelligent welding robot for chassis : It automatically recognize welding with laser vision sensor in the welding process for chassis. It was the first automatic production line application of Korean patent. The technology was developed in 1996 and operated in the production line of Daewoo Motor Co. from 1997.
- Colon Endoscope Robots : Colon endoscope goes through the path of colon automatically to reduce pains. To develop world's first endoscope robots, it was cooperatively developed in 2001 with Italian Labs.
- Capsule Type endoscopes : The next generation capsule-sized endoscope which is diagnostic imaging device and replacing conventional push type system. With size of 10mm*25mm, it is the world's smallest endoscope. It was developed in 2003 and transferred and confirmed contract with 13 systems.
- Active Capsule endoscopes: The next generation capsule endoscope which can be steered by medical doctor in real-time. It is transferred to Wooyoung in 2015.
- Stem Cell-based Biomedical Microrobot: Mesenchymal stem cell delivery scaffold with magnetic actuating system for articular cartilage regeneration. With size of 200~300 um, it is the world's first stem cell based microrobot. It was developed in 2017 and transferred and confirmed contract.

== See also ==
- Microrobotics
- Nanorobotics
- Biorobotics
