= Park Jong-sei =

- Born: 1943 (age 82–83); Seoul, South Korea
- Education: Seoul National University; Johns Hopkins University
- Employer: Korea Institute of Science and Technology; Food and Drug Administration; Lab Frontier
- Known for: Detecting Ben Johnson's steroid use during the 1988 Summer Olympics

Korean name
- Hangul: 박종세
- Hanja: 朴鍾世
- RR: Bak Jongse
- MR: Pak Chongse

Park Jong-sei (born 1943), also spelled Park Jong-se, is a South Korean chemistry researcher and former government official. He rose to worldwide notice during the 1988 Summer Olympics in Seoul for his role in detecting Ben Johnson's steroid use. He was later the head of South Korea's Food and Drug Administration (now the Ministry of Food and Drug Safety) under President Kim Dae-jung from March 1998 until January 1999, and founded protein microarray development start-up Lab Frontier in 2002.

== Early career ==
A graduate of Seoul National University's Department of Chemistry, Park moved to the United States to earn a PhD from Johns Hopkins University and then did postdoctoral research at Georgetown University before joining the faculty of Georgetown and the University of Maryland. He later naturalised as a U.S. citizen and worked for the government of Maryland's Department of Health and Mental Hygiene. Park moved back to South Korea in 1986, where he served as head of the Korea Institute of Science and Technology's Applied Sciences Division. He resumed his original South Korean citizenship and relinquished U.S. citizenship in 1996 before joining the Food and Drug Administration, as South Korea did not permit dual citizenship at the time.

In his capacity at KIST, Park was involved with drug testing at the 1988 Summer Olympics in Seoul as head of the Olympic Doping Control Center. There, he was responsible for the detection of stanozolol in urine and blood samples from Ben Johnson which resulted in the latter being stripped of his gold medal. Park took great care in performing the urinalysis, and even repeated the test procedure from scratch to be entirely sure of his results before reporting the sample to International Olympic Committee officials; he did not find out to whom the sample belonged until days later, as the samples were not labelled by name per standard procedure. ABC World News named him "Person of the Week" on 30 September 1998 for his role in bringing the scandal to light. He also detected marijuana usage by three athletes, though no action was taken against them as marijuana was not a banned performance-enhancing substance. Park clashed with Olympics officials over other aspects of how he did his job, and made angry comments to the Washington Post about false samples with trace amounts of banned substances which had been planted among genuine samples in his lab. His work at the Olympic Doping Control Center earned him the Scientist of the Year Award by the Korea Science Journalists Association.

== As head of the Food and Drug Administration ==
Park was appointed head of the Food and Drug Administration in March 1998. His appointment came as a surprise to observers, as he was a scientist in what was typically viewed as a political position. In his new capacity, he conducted a shake-up of the administration, replacing seven long-serving officers and recruiting more than 40 new scientists from South Korea and overseas. Park's disregard for earlier seniority-based promotion procedures elicited opposition from the bureaucracy, and the Chosun Ilbo reported that some disgruntled anti-reformists in the administration had made anonymous denunciations to prosecutors about Park's alleged receipt of bribes, resulting in an investigation of him just months after he was appointed to his new position.

In January 1999, Park was arrested on bribery charges, with prosecutors stating that for several years beginning in 1992, a local pharmaceutical company executive had paid him ₩185 million in bribes for his aid in getting the company's drugs approved. Park's arrest was part of President Kim Dae-jung's crackdown on corruption in the medical industry, and was followed in February by the arrest of Park's director-general of pharmaceutical safety Kim Yon-pan. Park was convicted on the charges and sentenced to three years in prison and five years of probation. He served roughly two years of his sentence, and was released in 2000.

== Later career ==
In 2002, Park founded Lab Frontier, a biotechnology start-up which collaborated with Ewha Womans University on protein microarray development. He also later became president of the Bio Venture Association. In November 2007, he was arrested on fraud charges relating to alleged falsification of pharmaceuticals trial reports used to get regulatory approval for pharmaceuticals, on the basis of a tip from a paid informant which led to indictments of 22 other researchers.

== Selected publications ==
- Seung, Sang-Ae; Lee, Joo-Young; Lee, Moo-Yeol; Park, Jong-Sei; Chung, Jin-Ho (15 May 1998). "The relative importance of oxidative stress versus arylation in the mechanism of quinone-induced cytotoxicity to platelets". Chemico-Biological Interactions. 113 (2): 133–144. Bibcode:1998CBI...113..133S. doi:10.1016/S0009-2797(98)00024-6. PMID 9717514.
- Yoon, Kyung-Hwan; Lee, So-Young; Kim, Won; Park, Jong-Sei; Kim, Hie-Joon (25 December 2004). "Simultaneous determination of amoxicillin and clavulanic acid in human plasma by HPLC–ESI mass spectrometry". Journal of Chromatography B. 813 (1–2): 121–127. doi:10.1016/j.jchromb.2004.09.018. PMID 15556524.
