= Cho (Han) Hae-joang =

South Korean anthropologist (born 1948)

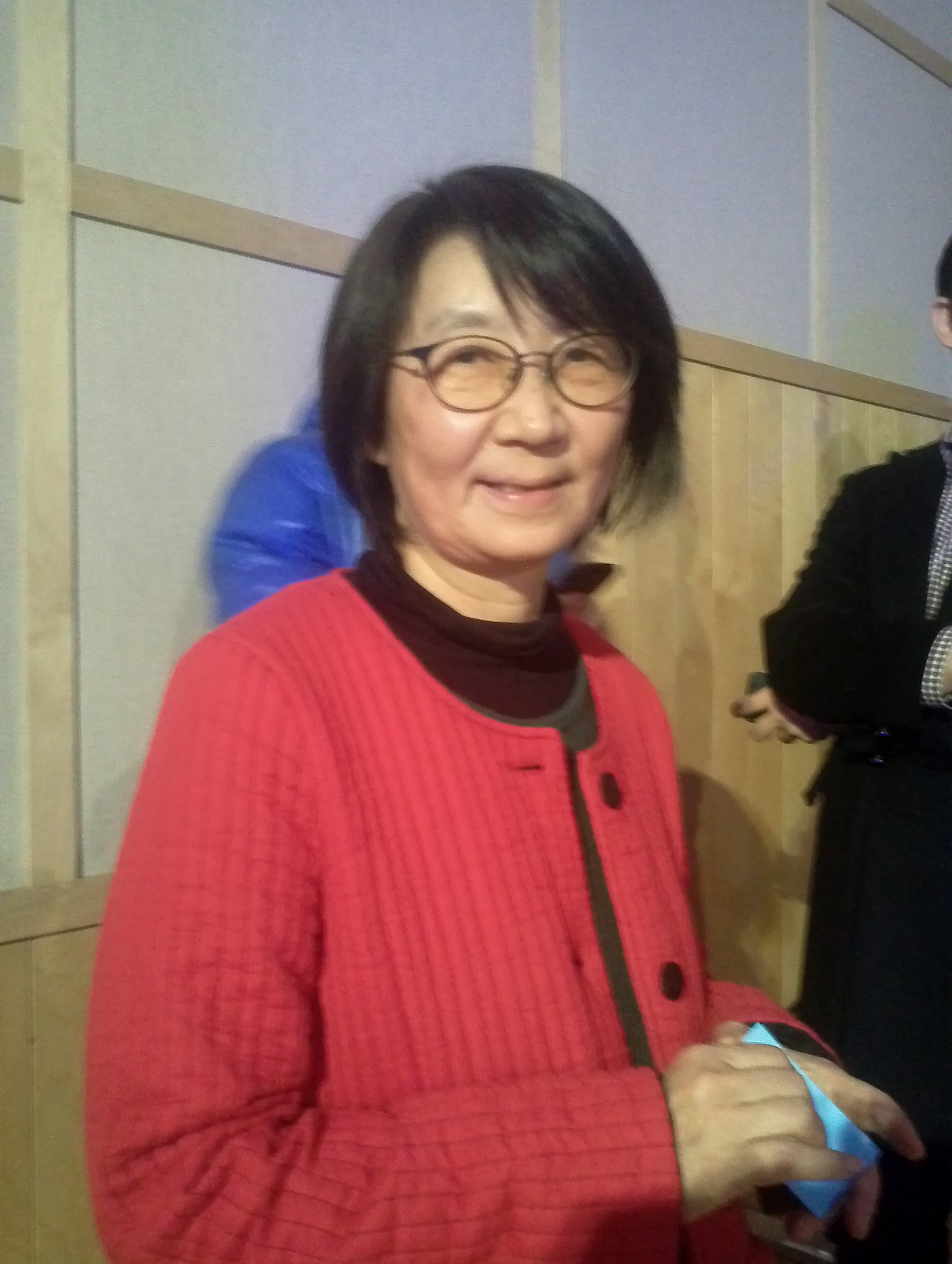
- Born: October 25, 1948 (age 77)
- Education: Yonsei University (B.A.), University of Missouri–Columbia (M.A.), UCLA (PhD)
- Occupations: anthropologist, educator
- Spouse: Kilnam Chon

Cho Hae-joang (Korean: 조(한)혜정; Hanja: 趙(韓)惠貞; Korean pronunciation: [dzo.(han).hɛ.dzʌŋ]; born October 25, 1948) is a South Korean anthropology scholar, critic, feminist, and author. As an author on gender, culture, education, and post-colonialism, she has analyzed myths in Korean society and has helped bridge academia and non-academia. Through a movement to use the family names of both parents, she contributed to social actions to abolish the patriarchal family registry system known as Hojuje (호주제; 戶主制).

Cho has researched Korean social changes to feminism, youth culture, and family structure. She studied the family system and gender issues in Korean society, and has analyzed changes to the traditional family structure and inequality issues in modern Korean society. She suggested ways for youth to participate more independently in society and supported their growth and independence, emphasizing practical support over theoretical approaches.

She is known for presenting methodologies about alternative education which can interpret Asian problems from global perspectives, and has developed alternative educational research for the youth of South Korea. Cho's research on women and youth issues has been published in multinational academic journals. Her writing has inspired further global research on family, gender, and youth issues in contemporary society.

== Life ==
Cho (Han) was born in Busan, South Korea, on October 25, 1948. She grew up in South Korea, and graduated with a BA degree in history from Yonsei University in 1971. Cho (Han) received an MA degree from the University of Missouri–Columbia in 1974 and a PhD degree in anthropology from UCLA in 1979. While studying in the United States she married Kilnam Chon, a South Korean computer scientist who became a professor of computer science at the Korea Advanced Institute of Science and Technology. In March 1979, Cho (Han) began lecturing in Seoul National University's Department of Anthropology before moving to the Department of Sociology at Yonsei University in September of that year. In 2008, she moved to the newly-established Department of Cultural Anthropology at Yonsei University. Cho (Han) became a professor emeritus at Yonsei University in 2014.

== Research ==
Cho (Han) is known for advancing cultural studies and feminism, and for alternative education projects; she was the first professor in the Department of Anthropology at Yonsei University. Her work has appeared in international journals and conferences. Cho's research on gender conflict and changes in family structure amid rapid economic development in modern Korean society has been part of contemporary academic and public discourse. She is best known for 1995 trilogy, Reading Lives in the Postcolonial Era (탈식민지 시대 지식인의 글 읽기와 삶 읽기). Like other works which examine gender roles and societal changes in modern Korean society, the trilogy analyzes the daily experiences of her students, their interactions with global capitalism, and conflicts with their cultural identities. About the everyday conflicts surrounding rapid modernization and globalization, Cho examines change itself and discusses the concept of Ulrich Beck's "risk society" which highlights the systemic risks generated in modern industrial societies; Beck says that industrial modernization presents individuals with social challenges. Cho analyzes Judith Butler's theory of mourning and violence, which underscores the political dimensions of grief amid systemic inequality and social fragmentation.

Cho's analysis of Beck and Butler's concepts in a Korean context reinterprets the educational challenges of Korean social modernization. Integrating the "risk society" concept, she notes that the modernization of Korean society introduced educational policies which generated cultural anxiety. While analyzing Butler's perspective on mourning and violence, Cho says that Korean educational reforms failed to deal with the educational experiences of marginalized groups, worsening a vicious circle of social alienation. These studies combined social movements based on 1980s activists with 1990s discourse.

Cho has contributed to studies of the Korean Wave (한류; 韓流), saying that the wave helps to reshape cultural identity in non-Western societies; moving away from Western cultural standards, it enables alternative forms of subjectivity in Asian popular culture worldwide. She viewed the Korean Wave as a connection between globalization and local cultural socioeconomic practices. Cho's studies of Western and Korean cultures encouraged other scholars to combine educational theories of the 1980s, the 1990s, and the 2000s.

She has also contributed to alternative-education projects for youth. Cho has sought practical change since 1999, establishing the Haja Center (the Seoul Youth Factory for Alternative Culture) in Seoul that year to help teenagers attain independence and creative growth. As founding director of the center's (하자 센터) Seoul Youth Job and Work Experience Center, she implemented educational models. The center has promoted alternative learning experiences for teenagers, educational models which aim to foster youth's critical and creative engagements in society. The Haja project has promoted social action to solve problems of youth from the perspectives of feminism and cultural and ecological studies in an East Asian context.

== Translated work ==
- Sex and Temperament in Three Primitive Societies by Margaret Mead (세 부족 사회에서의 성과 기질, 1988)

== Awards ==
- 2013: Jade Stripes, Order of Service Merit, Republic of Korea (대한민국 근정 훈장 옥조; Hanja: 勤政勳章玉條).
- 2014: Ilmin Art Award (일민문화상).
- 2018: 18th Yeonmun Award from Yonsei University (연세대학교 연문인상).
- 2021: Hugwang Academic Award from Chonnam National University (전남대학교 후광학술상; Hanja: 後廣).
- 2023: Women's Leadership Award from Samsung Happiness for Tomorrow Awards (삼성행복대상 여성선도상).
