= Jisoon Ihm =

South Korean physicist (born 1951)

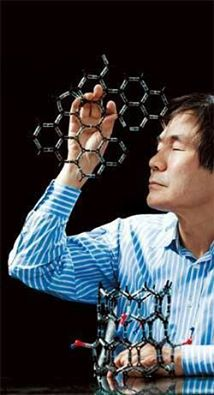
- Born: July 4, 1951 (age 75); South Korea
- Education: B.S. Seoul National University, Ph.D. University of California at Berkeley, United States
- Known for: Computational materials physics
- Awards: Korea Science Award (1996); Scientist of the Year Award (1998); Inchon Award (2004); POSCO TJ Park Prize (2007); Top Scientist and Technologist Award of Korea (2007); Ho-Am Prize in Science (2023)
- Scientific career
- Fields: Solid-State Physics Theory
- Workplaces: Seoul National University
- Doctoral advisor: Marvin L. Cohen

- Jisoon Ihm
- Hangul: 임지순
- Hanja: 任志淳
- RR: Im Jisun
- MR: Im Chisun

Jisoon Ihm is a South Korean physicist and Distinguished Professor in Department of Physics at Pohang University of Science and Technology in Pohang, South Korea.

== Education ==
- B.S. in Physics at Seoul National University
- M.A. in Physics at University of California at Berkeley
- Ph.D. in Physics at University of California at Berkeley

== Works ==
- 1980–1982: postdoc at MIT
- 1982–1984: postdoc at AT&T Bell Labs
- 1984–1986: member of Technical Staff at Bell Communications Research
- 1986–2016: professor at Department of Physics and Astronomy, Seoul National University
- 2016–present: Distinguished Professor at Department of Physics, POSTECH

== Awards and recognition ==
His first paper published in 1979 spawned a new area in condensed matter physics, namely, "computational materials physics," and the paper is nowadays regarded as classic in the field. He also published an invited review article on this subject as a single author in Reports on Progress in Physics in 1988. He has carried out research in the development of a novel computational formulation for calculating the total energy of solids based on quantum mechanics. An international society on this field of research was formed around 1990, and its 16th annual meeting was held in Trieste, Italy, in January 2013. He has been a member of the Scientific Committee for this series of meetings. A similar society was formed in Asia in 1998 and he has played a key role in its birth and continued growth.

In 1996, he was presented with the Korea Science Award, which included a commendation by the president of Korea, and two years later won the Scientist of the Year Award. IN 2004, he received the Inchon Award.

He was Director of the Center for Theoretical Physics at SNU during the period 2006–2010. He has been a Fellow of the American Physical Society since 2007, and a Foreign Associate of the National Academy of Sciences of the USA since 2011. He has been a Distinguished Professor at Seoul National University since 2009. He is now engaged in improving the formalism of computational materials physics and its applications to many different material systems such as carbon nanotubes, graphene, topological insulators, and energy storage materials. In 2023, he was awarded the Ho-Am Prize in Science in the field of physics and mathematics. The following year, he became a laureate of the Asian Scientist 100 by the Asian Scientist.
