= Errol Solomon Meyers =

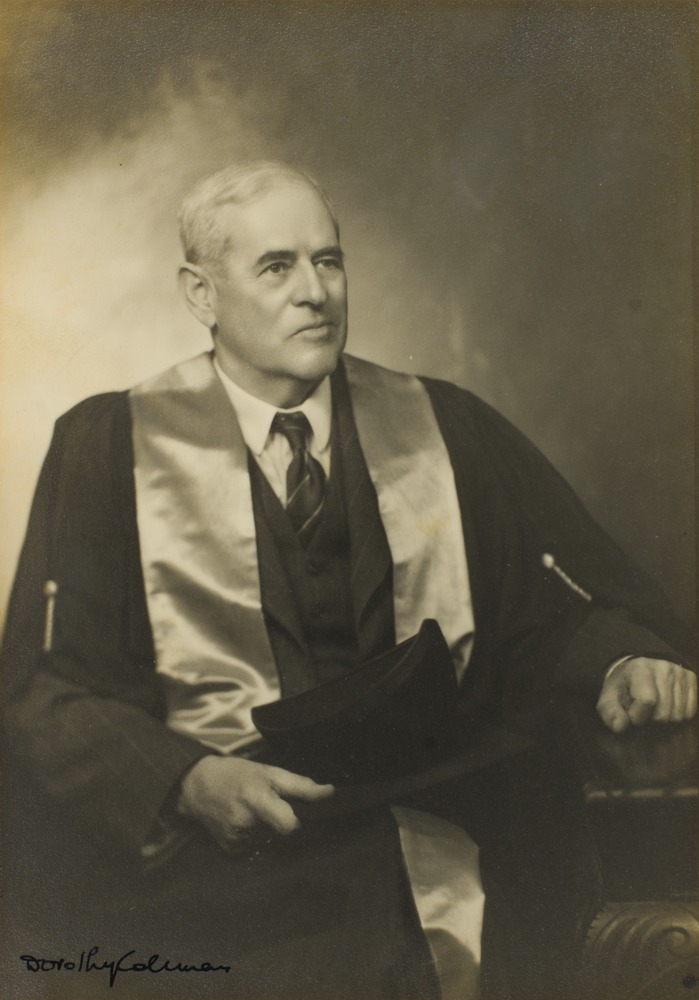
Studio portrait of Dr Errol Solomon Meyers wearing academic robes,1946

Professor Errol Solomon Meyers (9 August 1890 – 11 February 1956) was an Australian doctor and one of the founding fathers of the University of Queensland School of Medicine in Brisbane, Queensland, Australia. He was a leader in medical and dental education in Queensland. Meyers also served with distinction during World War I.

== Early life ==
Errol Solomon Meyers was born in South Brisbane on 9 August 1890, the son of Ernest Ralph Meyers, a dentist, who migrated from Liverpool, England, and practiced for a time in Brisbane. His mother was Savine Lenneberg, whose father, a native of Prussia, ran the Shakespeare Hotel in George Street. Errol's father left the family to live in Western Australia, leaving his wife to raise their two young sons. She became the manageress of the Grand Hotel and later the Pacific Hotel at Southport.

Meyers attended the Southport State School and then the Brisbane Grammar School. As he wished to study medicine the family moved to Sydney where he trained at Sydney University. While there Errol was a member of the Sydney University Scouts for five years. This unit was raised in 1900 as part of the Colonial New South Wales Defence Force. During World War I over 60% of the Scouts enlisted in the Australian Imperial Force.

Errol graduated with a medical degree in 1914. He worked at the Sydney Hospital as a house physician, resident pathologist and resident radiographer, before returning to Brisbane in 1915 and becoming the resident medical officer at the Brisbane General Hospital.

== Military service ==
From November 1915 until the end of February 1916 he was a member of the Australian Army Medical Corps Citizen Forces working as a medical officer at the Camp Clearing Hospitals in Brisbane's Fraser's Hill and the Toowoomba military training camp. He then enlisted in the Australian Imperial Force and was appointed to the rank of Captain serving at the 13th Australian General Hospital and the Fraser's Hill and Rifle Range Camps in Enoggera Barracks, Brisbane. He embarked for overseas service on 10 May 1917 leaving from Sydney on the transport ship Marathon, visiting Durban, South Africa, en route to England.

After a stint at the Australian Army Medical Corps training depot at Parkhouse in England, he proceeded to France on 5 October 1917 serving as regimental medical officer to the 41st Battalion. In May 1918 he was wounded in action with mustard gas and was admitted to the 1st General Hospital in Le Havre, France. After convalescence Errol was assigned to the 11th Australian Field Ambulance which took part in the final assault on the Hindenberg Line.

He was promoted to Major in July 1918. Errol was also recommended by Lieutenant Colonel Hugh Bennett Lewers, Commanding Officer of the 11th Australian Field Ambulance, to receive a D.S.O. or O.B.E. The recommendation reads:

I regret very much that I was appointed to this Unit too late to recommend this officer for his services in the line under heavy fire. As R.M.O. (Regimental Medical Officer) of the 41st Battalion I understand his services were brave and unremitting and that an entry in the 41st Battalion War Diary has been made accordingly. Since 15.9.18 I cannot speak too highly of this Officer. His knowledge of drill and military routine, his enthusiasm and organising ability and his unremitting industry has led me to regard him as a most invaluable Officer. The general training of the Unit has been in his charge. I have now placed the Educational Scheme of the Unit in his hands and the success of this is solely due to his committee. Major Meyers is a keen disciplinarian and his training and example in this respect to junior Medical Officers has been invaluable. To recognise Major Meyers’ field work I recommend him for D.S.O. – failing recognition of field work -for an O.B.E.

Meyers never received the D.S.O. or an O.B.E. After the war he stayed in England and undertook postgraduate training at the Seamen's Hospital in Greenwich, London, returning to Australia in August 1919.

== University career ==
In civilian life he had a distinguished career as a surgeon and also as a teacher of anatomy and surgery. One of his greatest achievements was the establishment of a medical school in Queensland, a goal he worked towards for many years, and which culminated with the inauguration of the Faculty of Medicine at the University of Queensland in 1936. He was elected Dean of the Faculty of Medicine in 1942 and held this position for the next twelve years.

== Later life ==
He died in Brisbane on 11 February 1956 after many years of ill health, the result of being gassed during the war and was buried in the Jewish section of the Toowong Cemetery.

== Legacy ==
After his death, the ES Meyers Memorial Lecture was inaugurated in 1957 by the University of Queensland Medical Society (UQMS) to honour his role in establishing medical education in Queensland. The Lecture has since grown into a celebrated tradition in Australian medical circles.

Meyers’ three sons all became doctors.
