= Ranjana Srivastava =

Australian oncologist and author

Ranjana Srivastava OAM
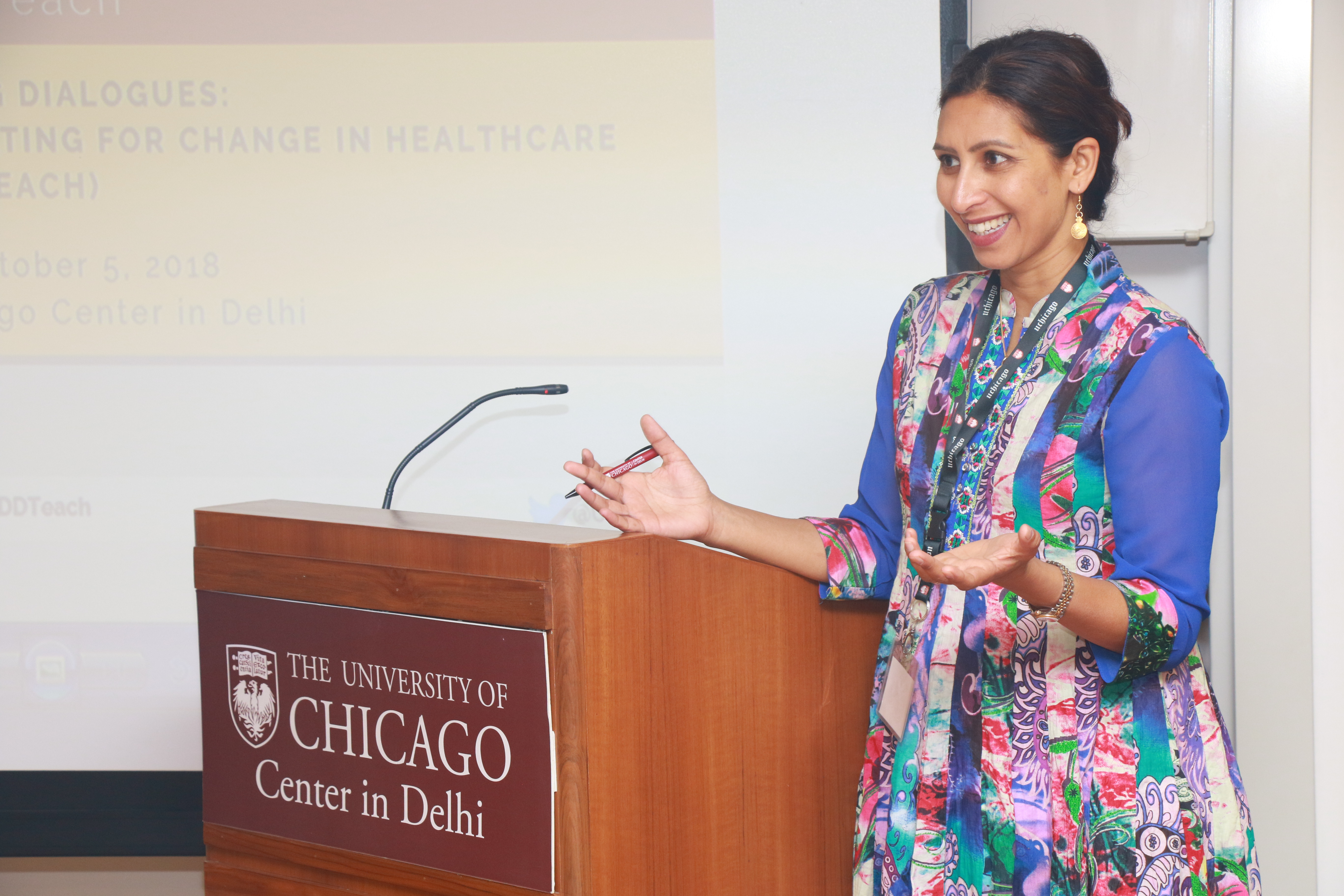
- Srivastava speaking at the University of Chicago Centre in New Delhi
- Born: Canberra, Australia
- Education: Monash University; University of Chicago; Harvard University
- Known for: Oncologist, author, columnist, journalist, orator
- Scientific career
- Fields: Oncology, ethics, public policy
- Website: www.ranjanasrivastava.com

Ranjana Srivastava

Personal details
- Party: Liberal Party

Ranjana Srivastava is an Australian oncologist, Fulbright scholar and author. She is a regular columnist for The Guardian newspaper, where she writes about the intersection between medicine and humanity, and a frequent essayist for the New England Journal of Medicine. She was a finalist for the Walkley Award for Excellence in Journalism in 2018.

She has also written many non-fiction books related to health and medicine, has appeared frequently on TV, radio, and podcasts, and publicly speaks at events where she addresses various topics and matters relating to medicine.

== Early life and education ==
Ranjana Srivastava was born in Canberra, Australia in 1974. Her parents were born and raised in India.

Her father's occupation as a physicist meant the family moved around the world living near universities. Her schooling took place mainly in India, but also in the United States, the United Kingdom, and Australia. She received her medical degree with first class honours from Monash University. In 2004, she received the distinguished Fulbright Award, which she used to obtain a fellowship in medical ethics and doctor-patient communication at the MacLean Center for Clinical Medical Ethics at the University of Chicago. Srivastava received a second Fulbright Award to undertake a Master in Public Administration (MPA) at Harvard University. She is also the recipient of a John F. Kennedy merit scholarship to Harvard University.

== Career ==
Srivastava works in the public healthcare system in Victoria. She says that her early experiences have drawn her to the care of migrants and refugees and improving conditions in areas of disadvantage. Her own experience of losing twins in utero has led her to a keen appreciation of the need for honesty and truth-telling in medicine.

A regular contributor to the London newspaper The Guardian, she has also written a number of books, including Tell Me the Truth, Dying for a Chat, So It's Cancer: Now What, and After Cancer: A Guide to Living Well. In Dying for a Chat, she writes that increased medical specialisation means that doctors can fail to see the whole picture, with risks for patients from a failure of communication.

Srivastava is a frequent co-host on The Conversation Hour, a flagship radio program on the Australian Broadcasting Corporation (ABC), Melbourne. She has also developed a podcast series on health and wellbeing for ABC Radio National. These podcasts include: "The Ripple Effect of Cancer" and "An Illness in the Family". Srivastava has been a health presenter on ABC News Breakfast and has appeared on other programs, including: Counterpoint, Catalyst, Q&A, and Life Matters and the ABC current affairs show 7:30.

She has addressed many graduation ceremonies, commencement ceremonies, and major gatherings, and has hosted several events at the Wheeler Centre for Events and Ideas. Srivastava was selected to deliver the Errol Solomon Meyers Memorial Lecture at the University of Queensland Medical School. Former speakers have included Pakistani PM Imran Khan, Sir Edmund Hillary, and author Jeffrey Archer. She also delivered a TEDx talk in 2017 in Melbourne on The Art of Medicine.

== Politics ==
Srivastava was an unsuccessful candidate for Liberal preselection in the seat of Casey in November 2021, prior to the 2022 federal election. She also sought Liberal candidacy for the 2023 Aston by-election. Despite being supported by former Health Minister Greg Hunt and former Victorian Premier Jeff Kennett, her candidacy was unsuccessful, losing to barrister Roshena Campbell.

== Awards and honours ==
- Order of Australia medal (OAM) in 2017, awarded for her role in oncology and improving doctor-patient communication.
- Bucksbaum Institute International Scholar, 2017 at the Bucksbaum Institute for Clinical Excellence at the University of Chicago.
- Dying for a Chat, Human Rights Literature Prize in 2013. .
- Finalist in the 2018 Walkley Awards in the "Commentary, Analysis, Opinion and Critique" category, for her article "Healthcare from the front-line".
- Westpac Women of Influence Award
- Monash University Distinguished Alumni Award
- Tell Me the Truth, shortlisted for the NSW Premier's Literary Prize in 2011.
- What It Takes to Be A Doctor: An Insider's Guide, finalist for the Australian Career Book Award.
- Mumbrella Publish Awards, highly commended

== Selected works ==
- Srivastava, Ranjana (2020). A Better Death: Conversations about the art of living and dying well. Simon & Schuster Australia. ISBN 9781925750966.
- Srivastava, Ranjana (2018). What It Takes to Be a Doctor: An Insider's Guide. Simon & Schuster Australia. ISBN 978-1925791747.
- Srivastava, Ranjana (2010). Tell me the truth : conversations with my patients about life and death. Viking. ISBN 978-0-670-07440-2.
- Srivastava, Ranjana (2013). Dying for a chat : the communication breakdown between doctors and patients (This edition published by Penguin Books (Australia), 2013 ed.). Penguin Books. ISBN 978-0-14-356964-0.
- Srivastava, Ranjana; Olver, Ian, (writer of foreword.) (2014). So it's cancer : now what?. Penguin Group (Australia). ISBN 978-0-670-07795-3.
- Srivastava, Ranjana (2015). After cancer : a guide to living well. Penguin Random House Australia. ISBN 978-0-14-357359-3.
- Srivastava, Ranjana, (Oncologist) (2015). A cancer companion : an oncologist's advice on diagnosis, treatment, and recovery. Chicago The University of Chicago Press. ISBN 978-0-226-30664-3.
- Srivastava, Ranjana (2018). What it takes to be a doctor. Simon & Schuster Australia. ISBN 978-1-925791-74-7.
