= Jared Purton =

Australian-born immunologist (1976–2009)

Jared Franklin Purton
- Born: March 1976; Box Hill, Victoria, Australia
- Died: December 2009 (aged 33); La Jolla, California, United States
- Scientific career
- Fields: Biology; Immunology
- Institutions: Monash University; The Scripps Research Institute
- Doctoral advisor: Dale Godfrey; Timothy Cole
- Other academic advisors: Charles Surh

Jared Franklin Purton (March 1976 – December 2009) was an Australian-born immunologist who contributed to the understanding of how T cells function through his academic research. After his death in a car accident in 2009, the Jared F. Purton Foundation was set up in his memory to support charitable causes in the San Diego area.

== Biography ==
Purton was born in Box Hill, Victoria, a suburb of Melbourne, and grew up in Sale, Victoria until the end of primary school. He then moved to Surrey Hills, Victoria where he attended Camberwell High School until the end of Year 10. He completed Years 11 and 12 at Camberwell Grammar School.

Purton was an avid sportsman and longstanding member of the Camberwell Hockey Club. He was a supporter of the Essendon Football Club in the Australian Football League, the association football teams Celtic F.C. and Norwich City F.C., and the Boston Celtics in the National Basketball Association. Purton also achieved certifications in open water and rescue scuba diving, and logged over a hundred dives.

A health scare in Purton's family prompted him to embark on a career as a medical research scientist. He helped organise fundraisers for cancer research, and volunteered his time at a camp in Pasadena, California, for children affected by HIV and AIDS. He was also a keen participant in Movember each year.

== Scientific career ==
Purton earned an undergraduate degree in Genetics from Monash University in 1998 and Doctor of Philosophy in Immunology from Monash University in 2002. He was commended for the 2002 Victorian Premier's Awards for Medical Research and won the Mollie Holman Medal for Excellence in a PhD Thesis on graduation. Purton published three first-author papers from his thesis entitled, "The influence of glucocorticoids and other factors in T-cell development and selection". His major publication appeared in the prominent journal, Immunity.

After being awarded a prestigious National Health and Medical Research Council CJ Martin Fellowship, Purton travelled to San Diego in 2003 to commence his postdoctoral studies at The Scripps Research Institute. During his time working with T cells and vaccines at Scripps, Purton published another three first-author papers as a postdoctoral fellow.

== Death ==
In December 2009, Purton was struck from behind while in his car by a speeding drunk driver. Purton was killed instantly. A memorial service for Purton was held at La Jolla Shores where over 300 people attended. A second memorial service was later held in his home town of Melbourne where over 500 people attended the Salvation Army Hall in Camberwell, Victoria. Many people wore green to the memorial service, which was Purton's favourite colour.

== Legacy ==
Since his death, the Jared F. Purton Foundation was set up in Purton's memory to promote local volunteerism and create positive changes in the San Diego community. Since 2010, a 5K Charity Run/Walk around Mission Beach, San Diego has been held every October.

The Scripps Research postdoctoral group Society of Fellows also created the Jared Purton Award "in loving memory of our esteemed colleague". The prize is awarded annually as part of the group's research symposium to individuals who excel in the field of immunology.

The Monash University Department of Immunology and Pathology established the Jared Purton Prize in Immunology in 2010. This award is offered to the top undergraduate Bachelor of Science or Biomedical Science student undertaking immunology as their major field of study.

The Australian and New Zealand Society for Immunology offers an annual Jared Purton - ASI Award to recognise and further advance the research of early-mid career immunologists at a critical point in their career. The prize money for First and Second prizes is generously donated by Jared's parents.

== Publications ==
The following are Jared Purton's first-author publications. A full list of all papers on which Jared is a co-author is available through PubMed.

- Purton, Jared F; Boyd, Richard L; Cole, Timothy J; Godfrey, Dale I (2000). "Intrathymic T Cell Development and Selection Proceeds Normally in the Absence of Glucocorticoid Receptor Signaling". Immunity. 13 (2): 179–86. doi:10.1016/S1074-7613(00)00018-2. PMID 10981961.
- Purton, Jared F.; Zhan, Yifan; Liddicoat, Douglas R.; Hardy, Charles L.; Lew, Andrew M.; Cole, Timothy J.; Godfrey, Dale I. (2002). "Glucocorticoid receptor deficient thymic and peripheral T cells develop normally in adult mice". European Journal of Immunology. 32 (12): 3546–55. doi:10.1002/1521-4141(200212)32:12<3546::AID-IMMU3546>3.0.CO;2-S. PMID 12442337.
- Purton, JF; Monk, JA; Liddicoat, DR; Kyparissoudis, K; Sakkal, S; Richardson, SJ; Godfrey, DI; Cole, TJ (2004). "Expression of the glucocorticoid receptor from the 1A promoter correlates with T lymphocyte sensitivity to glucocorticoid-induced cell death". Journal of Immunology. 173 (6): 3816–24. doi:10.4049/jimmunol.173.6.3816. PMID 15356129.
- Purton, J. F.; Tan, J. T.; Rubinstein, M. P.; Kim, D. M.; Sprent, J.; Surh, C. D. (2007). "Antiviral CD4+ memory T cells are IL-15 dependent". Journal of Experimental Medicine. 204 (4): 951–61. doi:10.1084/jem.20061805. PMC 2118539. PMID 17420265.
- Purton, Jared F.; Sprent, Jonathan; Surh, Charles D. (2007). "Staying alive – naïve CD4+ T cell homeostasis". European Journal of Immunology. 37 (9): 2367–9. doi:10.1002/eji.200737721. PMID 17724689.
- Purton, Jared F; Martin, Chris E; Surh, Charles D (2008). "Enhancing T cell memory: IL-7 as an adjuvant to boost memory T-cell generation". Immunology and Cell Biology. 86 (5): 385–6. doi:10.1038/icb.2008.30. PMID 18475284.
