= Kilnam Chon =

South Korean computer scientist (born 1943)

- 전길남
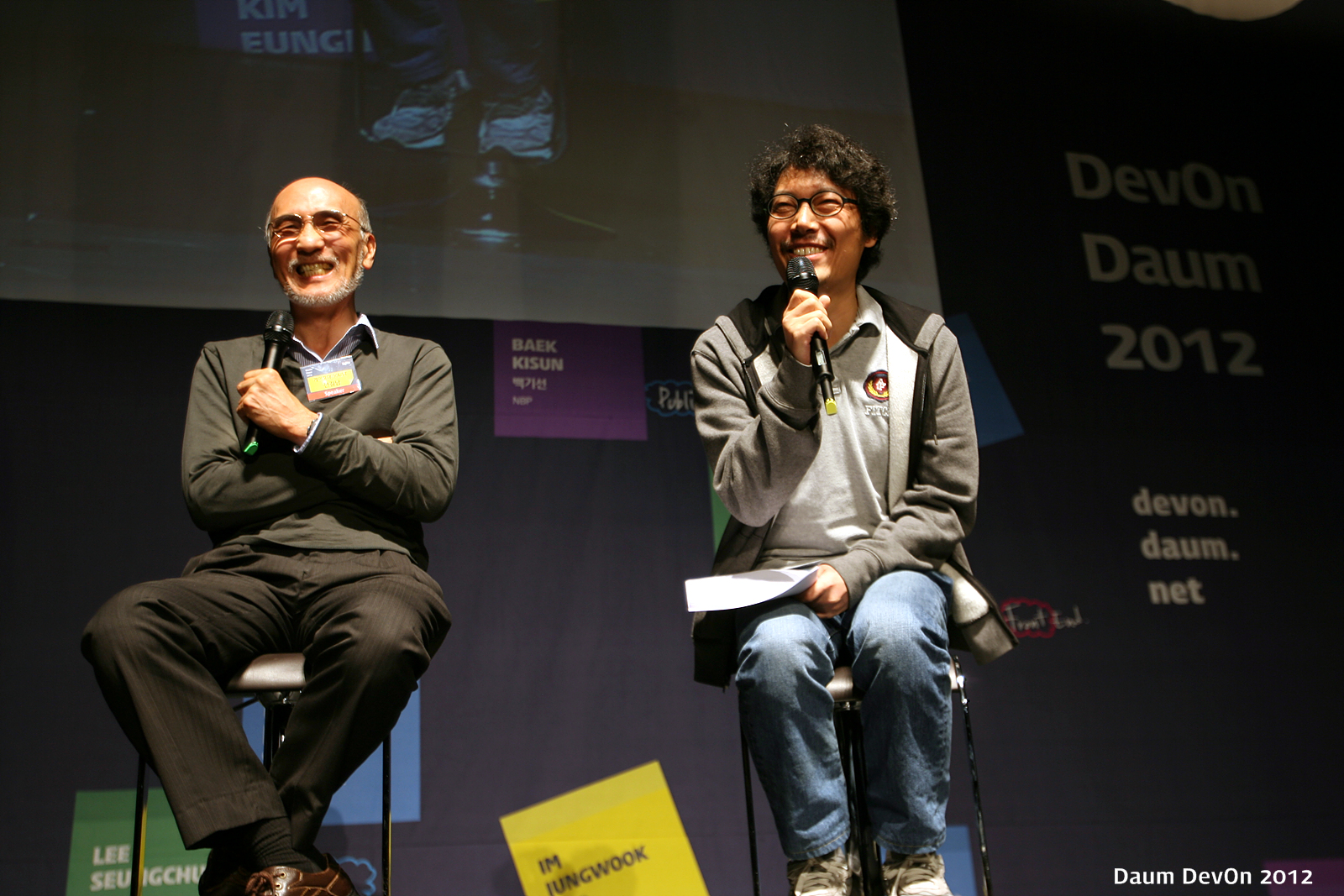
- Kilnam Chon (left) in 2014
- Born: 3 January 1943 (age 83); Japan
- Education: Osaka University (BS); UCLA (MS, PhD)
- Known for: Introduction of IPv4 to South Korea
- Spouse: Cho (Han) Hae-joang
- Scientific career
- Fields: Systems engineering
- Institutions: UCLA; Jet Propulsion Laboratory; ETRI; KAIST; Tsinghua University; Keio University

Kilnam Chon (Korean: 전길남; born 3 January 1943) is a South Korean computer scientist widely recognized for his pioneering contributions to the development of the internet in South Korea. His work led to South Korea becoming the second country in the world, after the United States, to establish an IPv4 network connection. Often referred to as the father of the Korean Internet, Chon played a key role in connecting Seoul National University and the Korea Institute of Electronics Technology in May 1982, marking a significant milestone in the country's technological advancement.

Chon earned a Bachelor of Science degree in electrical engineering from Osaka University in 1965 and later obtained a M.S. and Ph.D. in systems engineering from UCLA in 1967 and 1974, respectively. He worked as a computer system designer at Rockwell International and as a technical staff member at the Jet Propulsion Laboratory before returning to South Korea in 1979. There, he joined the Korea Institute of Electronics Technology (later known as the Electronics and Telecommunications Research Institute) as a researcher. From 1982 to 2008, he served as a professor of computer science at KAIST, where he continued to influence South Korea's digital infrastructure and the broader development of computing and networking technologies.

== Early life and education ==
Chon was born on January 3, 1943, in Japan. Little is publicly documented about his early childhood. His early exposure to technology and engineering would eventually lead him to become a pioneering figure in computer science and network infrastructure.

Chon pursued his undergraduate studies in Japan, earning a Bachelor of Science in electrical engineering from Osaka University in 1965. He then moved to the United States for graduate studies, obtaining a Ph.D. in systems engineering from UCLA in 1974. His time at UCLA coincided with the early development of ARPANET, the precursor to the modern internet, which played a significant role in shaping his expertise in networking technologies.

Following his doctorate, Chon worked as a computer system designer at Rockwell International and later as a technical staff member at the Jet Propulsion Laboratory (JPL), where he gained further experience in computing and network systems.

== Career ==
=== Internet in South Korea ===
Kilnam Chon has been recognized for his role in bringing the internet to South Korea, making it the earliest adopter of TCP/IP outside the U.S. and Europe. Chon earned his PhD at UCLA under Leonard Kleinrock, a key figure in ARPANET, though Chon did not work directly on the project. In the late 1970s, Chon returned to South Korea and joined the Korea Institute of Electronics Technology (KIET), now known as the Electronics and Telecommunications Research Institute (ETRI). In 1980, he and his colleagues proposed a national network, which was initially rejected but later approved in 1981 as the System Development Network (SDN). Unlike many early networks, the SDN adopted TCP/IP, which Chon has stated was a strategic decision to facilitate collaboration in South Korea's R&D field, aligning with global research institutions like UC Berkeley and MIT. However, Chon and his students faced challenges in developing the SDN using the TCP/IP protocol, including restrictions that prevented access to IP routers.

The network went live in May 1982 before ARPANET's official transition to TCP/IP. Initially, the network only connected 2 nodes—KIET and Seoul National University (SNU)—via a 1200 bps leased line. By 1985, the SDN linked 20 universities, national research centers, and corporate R&D labs, and by 1987, it expanded to other parts of Asia. In 1986, South Korea received its first public IP address block (128.134.0.0) and registered the .kr domain, marking its formal integration into the global internet.

Beyond technical infrastructure, Chon played a role in fostering international collaboration and shaping early internet governance in the Asia-Pacific region. He co-organized the Pacific Computer Communications Symposium (PCCS) in 1985, one of the first global internet conferences held in Seoul, and contributed to regional networking initiatives like the Joint Workshop on Computer Communications (JWCC), which later evolved into the International Conference on Information Networks (ICOIN).

=== University appointments ===
Upon return to South Korea in 1979, Chon began working at the Korea Institute of Electronics Technology (KEIT) where he worked on "the national computer development project" and started "a small project on computer networking" in 1980. In 1982, Chon began work as a professor at the Korea Advanced Institute of Science and Technology (KAIST), focusing on 'the internet and other networking activities," and serving as Department Chair from 1985-1987. In 2008, Chon served as a Visiting Professor at Tsinghua University in Beijing, China, and also began a professorship at Keio University. As of 2012, Chon was still a professor at both KAIST and Keio University.

=== Research ===
Chon was educated as a systems engineer, but his research interests also include system architecture, computer networking, distributed processing and information systems. As of 2025, Chon has more than 40 publications across these fields.

In addition to his work in the technical development of internet technology, Chon has shown an interest in historical documentation and internet history preservation, frequently engaging in discussions about the future of technology and its societal impact. Chon has written extensively on the history of technology in Asia, in 2006 co-publishing "A brief history of the internet in Korea," and an expanded article in 2014 "A history of computer networking and the internet in Korea." In 2015, Chin published a 332-page comprehensive history of the internet in Asia from in the 1990s, "An Asian internet History Second Decade (1991-2000)."

=== Other work ===
Chon also helped found multiple organizations and conferences, some of which remain active. Chon founded the Asia Pacific Networking Group, Asia Pacific Top Level Domain Name Forum, and in 1985 he served as the program chair of the Pacific Computer Communications Symposium.

=== Awards ===
- 1997: Awarded Scientist of the Year Award (Korea)
- 1998: Awarded Presidential Award – Information Technology (Korea)
- 2000: Became a fellow of the Institute of Electrical Engineers
- 2003: Became a fellow of the World Technology Forum
- 2003: Awarded World Technology Award – Communication Technology
- 2005: Became an honorary member of the World Innovation Foundation
- 2011: Awarded Jonathan B. Postel Service Award

== Personal life ==
Chon has also demonstrated a strong interest in digital preservation, internet governance, and open-source technology. He has promoted internet accessibility in Asia and has been involved in organizations that advocate for the expansion of digital infrastructure in underserved communities. He has also been involved in mentoring younger generations of computer scientists and engineers, particularly in South Korea and across Asia. He is also an adviser to Open Net and to the non-profit Commons Foundation.
