= Last Chance Surgery =

Australian television series

Last Chance Surgery is an Australian factual television series screened on the Seven Network that first screened in 2009. Last Chance Surgery is narrated by doctor and former Australian Medical Association president, Kerryn Phelps. The series features people whose only hope of survival is radical and dangerous surgery. The series was created by Executive Producer Danny Milosavljevic who was previously the executive producer of RPA. It is made by Southern Star Entertainment, Australia's largest independent television production company. Two of the surgeons featured on the show include prominent neurosurgeons, Prof Michael Morgan and Dr Charles Teo.

== See also ==
- List of Australian television series
