= Rowan Gillies =

Australian plastic surgeon

- Education: Sydney Grammar School; University of New South Wales
- Occupations: Plastic and reconstructive surgeon

Rowan Gillies is a plastic surgeon from Sydney, Australia and is a VMO Plastic Surgery at Royal North Shore Hospital. He has a specific interest in skin cancer, reconstruction and breast reconstruction as well as the management of severe burns and trauma. He is the youngest ever International Council President of the Nobel Prize–winning Médecins Sans Frontières.

Educated at Sydney Grammar School and graduating with honours from the University of New South Wales, Dr Gillies is a plastic and reconstructive surgeon. In January 2002 he became Australia's MSF leader and was thereafter elected as international leader that year. He has worked on the field for MSF in some of the world's most troubled regions, including Afghanistan, Sierra Leone, Sudan, Liberia, Beirut, Congo and Sri Lanka.

He was listed by The Age as one of "The 50 Australians Who Matter" in 2005.

Gillies delivered the prestigious 52nd annual Errol Solomon Meyers Memorial Lecture in 2009 in Brisbane, Australia.

He is currently part of the Lancet Commission on Global Surgery, the findings of which were published in early May 2015.
