= Jong Oh Park =

South Korean roboticist (born 1955)

Jong-Oh Park
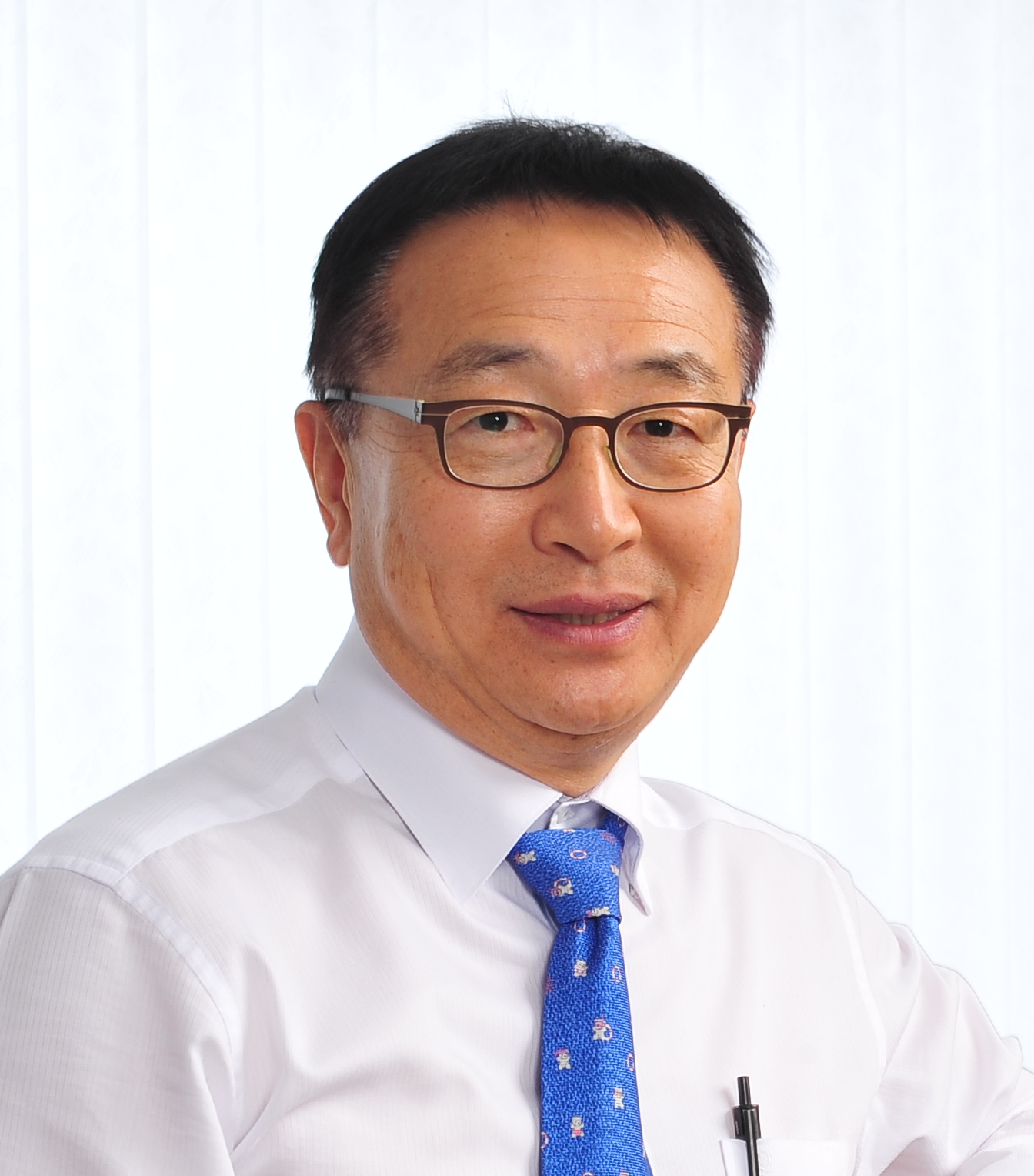
- Born: September 13, 1955 (age 70)
- Education: Yonsei University (B.S); KAIST (M.S); Stuttgart University (Ph.D)
- Occupations: President of Korea Institute of Medical Microrobotics, Professor of Chonnam National University, Director of Robot Research Initiative

Korean name
- Hangul: 박종오
- Hanja: 朴鍾午
- RR: Bak Jongo
- MR: Pak Chongo
- Website: http://www.jongohpark.com

Jong-Oh Park (Korean: 박종오; born September 13, 1955) is a South Korean robotics scholar. He is President of the Korea Institute of Medical Microrobotics and Robot Research Initiative. He joined the faculty of the school of Mechanical System Engineering at the Chonnam National University in South Korea, and presently serves as an executive board member at the International Federation of Robotics (IFR). He has twice received the Scientist of The Year Prize from the Korea Science Reporters Association, and is also the recipient of the IFR's Golden Robot Award, among many other honours. He has also successfully commercialized several robotic systems for medical and industrial applications.

== Biography ==
=== Education ===
Jong Oh Park received a B.S in Mechanical Engineering from Yonsei University in Seoul. In 1981, he received a M.S in Mechanical Engineering at KAIST in Daejeon.

After his master's degree, he finished a Ph.D. in Stuttgart University and worked as a researcher under the supervision of Hans-Jurgen Warnecke at Fraunhofer-IPA, Stuttgart, Germany from 1982 to 1987.

=== Career ===
From 1987 till 2004 he was associated with the Korea Institute of Science and Technology(KIST) and he had served as a director of 21C Frontier Project “ Intelligent Microsystem Program” for 5 years from 1999.

He was a professor of Chonnam National University(2005~2022) and a Director of Robot Research Initiative(RRI) in parallel.

He was the Chairman of The International Federation of Robotics (IFR) in 2006 and has been the executive board member of IFR.

In 2013, he worked as a Vice Chair of Organizing Committee of ISR 2013 and an Organizing chair of ICCAS 2013 and in 2014 he also served as Editor of IEEE Biorob 2014.

From 2014 to 2017, he served as vice president of the Institute of Control, Robotics and Systems(ICROS) and is currently chairman of the institute's BioRobot Research Group.

He was appointed as the member of Presidential Committee on the 4th Industrial Revolution and Ad Hoc Committee on the Healthcare in 2017.

Currently, he established and operates KIMIRo in 2019 as the president of the Korea Institute of Medical Microrobotics(KIMIRo).

== Work ==
=== Academic work ===
Jong Oh Park made a great contribution to Robot industry through scientific outcome and technical transfer.

As the representative achievements,

- Accomplished the world's first colonoscope robot in 2001 and successful commercialized in 2005.
- Developed the world's second capsule endoscope robot in 2003.
- Succeeded in an animal experiment for the world's first vascular therapy Microrobot.
- Acquired the world's original patent for bacteria-based Medical Microrobot and succeeded in animal experiment.
- Announced the development of the world's first immune cell-based Medical Microrobot and stem cell-based Medical Microrobot in 2016 and 2017, respectively.
- Development of the capsule endoscope of the 3rd generation in 2019.
- World's first suggestion of medical Nanorobot for solid tumor therapy in 2019.
- The first success in regeneration of knee cartilage using stem cell loaded Microrobot in 2020.
- Development of Multifunctional Microrobot with real-time visualization and magnetic resonance imaging for chemoembolization therapy of liver cancer in 2022.

=== Technology transfer ===
Jong Oh Park succeeded in technology transfer to industry.

- He transferred Automatic Insertion Robot of Odd-Parts to Samsung Electronics in 1991, polishing Robot of Die&Moulds to Hwacheon Machine Tool Co in 1993 and Automatic Polishing of Faucet to Yujin Waterworks in 1994.
- He also contracted technology transfer with Daewoo Motor Co. and Hyundai Motor Co. for Intelligent Grinding Robot for Car Brazing Bead in 1997.
- In 2005, he transferred Colonoscope Robot to ERA Endoscope Inc in Italy and Capsule Endoscope to Intromedic Inc.
- In 2015, he transferred Active Locomotive Intestinal Capsule Endoscope to Woo Young Medical.
- In 2017, he transferred Stem Cell-based Biomedical Microrobot to biot Inc.
- In 2019, he transferred Mobile installation frame and cable robot to Hyundae EDS Inc.

== Awards ==
- 2015: "Fraunhofer medal laureate, Fraunhofer
- 2013: Order of Science of Technology Merit ‘Hyeoksin Medal’ to Ministry of Science, ICT and Future Planning of Korea
- 1997: Golden Robot Award in International Federation of Robotics

== Selected papers ==
- “Multifunctional microrobot with real-time visualization and magnetic resonance imaging for chemoembolization therapy of liver cancer”, Science Advances, 2022.11.
- “Multifunctional Biodegradable Microrobot with Programmable Morphology for Biomedical Applications”, ASC Nano, 2021.01.
- “Human Adipose-derived Mesenchymal Stem Cell-based Medical Microrobot System for Knee Cartilage Regeneration In Vivo”, Science Robotics, 2020.01. (IF 19.4)
- “Multifunctional Nanorobot System for Active Therapeutic Delivery and Synergistic Chemo-photothermal Therapy”, Nano Letters, 2019.11
- “A Magnetically Actuated Microscaffold Containing Mesenchymal Stem Cells for Articular Cartilage Repair”, Advanced Healthcare Materials, 2017.03.
- “Hybrid-Actuating Macrophage-Based Microrobots for Active Cancer Therapy”, Nature, Scientific Reports, 2016.06., Vol.6 1-6 (IF 5.078)
- “Active Locomotive Intestinal Capsule Endoscope (ALICE) System: A Prospective Feasibility Study” IEEE-ASME TRANSACTIONS ON MECHATRONICS,2015.02.
- “New paradigm for tumor theranostic methodology using bacteria-based microrobot ”Nature, Scientific Reports, 2013.12.
- “Controlling uniformity of photopolymerized microscopic hydrogels” LAB ON A CHIP, 2014.02.
- “Precise manipulation of a microrobot in the pulsatile flow of human blood vessels using magnetic navigation system”, JOURNAL OF APPLIED PHYSICS 109, 2011.04., PP07B613-1~3
