= Jonathan Sprent =

Australian immunologist

Jonathan Sprent FRS
- Education: Walter and Eliza Hall Institute
- Known for: T cells
- Awards: Taylor Prize (1995); AAI Lifetime Achievement Award (2005)
- Scientific career
- Fields: immunology
- Workplaces: Garvan Institute of Medical Research
- Doctoral advisor: Jacques Miller

Professor Jonathan Sprent, FRS, is an Australian immunologist. His research has focused on the formation and activation of T cell leukocytes, and methods to overcome T cell-mediated rejection of transplanted tissue.

== Awards ==
1995: J. Allyn Taylor International Prize in Medicine
1998: Fellow of the Royal Society
2003: Errol Solomon Meyers Memorial Lecture
2006: Fellow of the Australian Academy of Science
2015: American Association of Immunologists Lifetime Achievement Award
2017: National Academy of Sciences (Immunology)

He is an honorary member of the British Society for Immunology.
