= Susan Kaech =

American immunologist

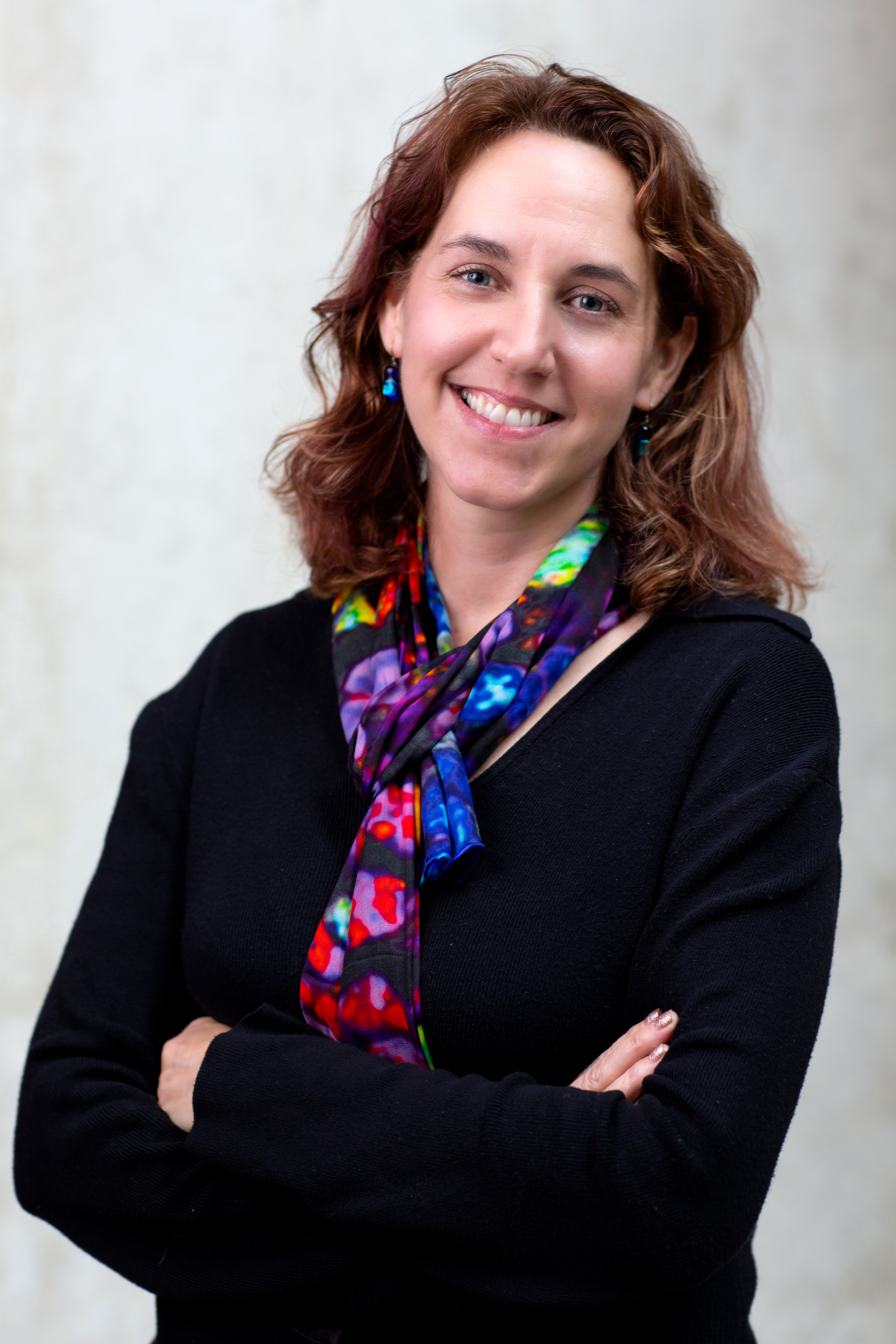
- Education: University of Washington (B.S.); Stanford University (Ph.D.); Emory University (Postdoctoral Fellow)
- Awards: Howard Hughes Early Career Scientist (2009); Presidential Early Career Award for Scientists and Engineers (2007)
- Scientific career
- Fields: Immunology
- Workplaces: Yale University, Salk Institute for Biological Sciences
- Doctoral advisor: Stuart Kim
- Website: https://www.salk.edu/scientist/susan-kaech/

Susan Kaech is an American immunologist. Kaech is a professor and director of the NOMIS Center for Immunobiology and Microbial Pathogenesis at the Salk Institute for Biological Sciences. She holds the NOMIS Foundation Chair. Her research focuses on the formation of memory T cells, T cell metabolism, and cancer immunotherapy.

== Education ==
Kaech conducted her undergraduate studies in Cellular and Molecular Biology at the University of Washington and her PhD in Developmental Biology at Stanford University.

== Awards and honors ==
- National Academy of Sciences, 2024
- Scientific Advisory Board member, Break Through Cancer, 2024 to 2025
- American Academy for Arts and Sciences, 2023
- American Association for the Advancement of Science, 2020
- HHMI Early Career Scientist, 2009
- Presidential Early Career Award for Scientists and Engineers (PECASE), 2007
- American Asthma Foundation Investigator Award, 2007
- Cancer Research Institute Investigator Award, 2005
- Edward Mallinckrodt Jr. Foundation Award, 2005
- Burroughs-Wellcome Foundation Award in Biosciences, 2003
- Damon Runyon-Walter Foundation Winchell Cancer Research Fellowship, 1999
- National Science Foundation Predoctoral Fellowship, 1993
