= Handong Global University =

University in South Korea

Coordinates: 36°6′14.6″N 129°23′17.7″E

- 한동대학교
- Other names: HGU
- Motto: “Why Not Change the World?”
- Type: Private
- Established: 1995
- Religious affiliation: Nondenominational Christian
- President: Dosung Choi
- Academic staff: 130
- Administrative staff: 78
- Undergraduates: 3,955 (2021)
- Postgraduates: 397 (2021)
- Location: Pohang, North Gyeongsang, South Korea
- Campus: Rural
- Mascot: Seagull
- Website: www.handong.edu

Handong Global University (Korean: 한동대학교; Hanja: 韓東大學校) is a private evangelical four-year university located in Pohang, North Gyeongsang, South Korea, with a campus of approximately 200 acres (0.81 km^{2}).

== History ==
The university was founded in December 1994. The founder, Song Tae-Hun, was an owner of a medium-sized company, and donated land and funds to establish a Christian university. He invited Kim Young-gil, a Christian leader who was formerly a NASA research scientist and a professor at Korea Advanced Institute of Science and Technology (KAIST).

The founder's company went bankrupt while Kim was recruiting the first professors and students. The university also met local opposition from Pohang citizens who expected the university to serve primarily Pohang residents. When it became known that the university would be a Christian university, recruiting students from all over Korea, many Pohang residents opposed its establishment. This led to lawsuits, in one of which Kim was accused of having used government subsidies for purposes which had not been officially approved. He was acquitted after spending 56 days in prison.

In 2007 Handong University joined the University Twinning and Networking (UNITWIN) program, an initiative of UNESCO. The university was selected as an "Advanced College Education (ACE)" institution by the Korean Ministry of Education in 2010 and 2011. It was nominated as one of the 10 United Nations Academic Impact (UNAI) hub universities in 2010. As the UNAI global hub for capacity-building in higher education, the university broke ground in 2017 for the Ban Ki-moon Global Education Institute (GEI).

In 2014, Chang Soon-Heung became the second president and announced new primary objectives for the university, framed as "Ten World-Changing Projects".

Dosung Choi became the third president of Handong Global University in 2022.

== Graduate schools ==
- General Graduate School
- Graduate School of Education
- Graduate School of Interpretation & Translation
- Graduate School of Global Management & Leadership
- Graduate School of Counseling
- Graduate School of Computer Science
- Graduate School of Electrical Engineering
- Graduate School of Mechanical Engineering
- Handong International Law School (HILS)
