= Monica Webb Hooper =

American behavioral scientist and clinical psychologist

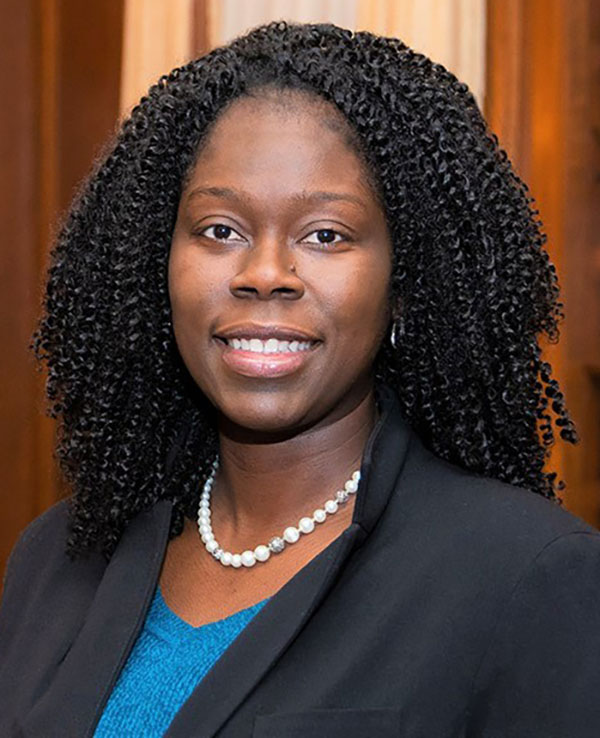
- Webb Hooper, 2020
- Born: Miami, Florida, US
- Education: University of Miami (BS); University of South Florida (MA, PhD)
- Children: 3
- Scientific career
- Fields: Behavioral science, clinical psychology
- Institutions: Case Western Reserve University National Institute on Minority Health and Health Disparities
- Thesis: Do Expectancies Influence Outcomes for Tailored Smoking Cessation Messages? A Placebo Tailoring Experiment (2005)
- Doctoral advisor: Thomas H. Brandon

Monica S. Webb Hooper is an American behavioral scientist and clinical psychologist serving as deputy director of the National Institute on Minority Health and Health Disparities. She was a professor at Case Western Reserve University and associate director for cancer disparities research and director of the Office of Cancer Disparities Research in the Case Comprehensive Cancer Center.

== Early life and education ==
Webb Hooper is from Miami, Florida. She completed a B.S. at the University of Miami. Webb Hooper earned a M.A. (2002) and a Ph.D. (2005) in clinical psychology from the University of South Florida. Her master's thesis was titled Tailored Interventions for Smoking Cessation: The Role of Personalization and Expectations. Webb Hooper's dissertation was titled Do Expectancies Influence Outcomes for Tailored Smoking Cessation Messages? A Placebo Tailoring Experiment. Her doctoral advisor was Thomas H. Brandon. She completed an internship in medical psychology at the University of Florida Health Sciences Center.

== Career ==
Webb Hooper is a translational behavioral scientist and clinical health psychologist. She was a professor of oncology, family medicine and community health and psychological sciences at Case Western Reserve University. She was also associate director for cancer disparities research and director of the Office of Cancer Disparities Research in the Case Comprehensive Cancer Center.

Webb Hooper became deputy director of the National Institute on Minority Health and Health Disparities (NIMHD) on March 15, 2020. In this role, she works with the director, Eliseo J. Pérez-Stable, and the leadership, to oversee all aspects of the institute and to support the implementation of the science visioning recommendations to improve minority health, reduce health disparities, and promote health equity.

Webb Hooper is an advocate for inclusion and diversity in the STEM pipeline.

=== Research ===
Webb Hooper has dedicated her career to the scientific study of minority health and racial/ethnic disparities, focusing on chronic illness prevention and health behavior change. Her work spans multiple disparity populations, including African Americans, Hispanics/Latinos, persons of less socioeconomic privilege, and people living with HIV/AIDS.

As a licensed clinical health psychologist, Webb Hooper led an active research lab at Case Western Reserve University focused on chronic disease prevention, health behavior change, tobacco use, weight management and obesity, stress processes, biobehavioral interventions, and social determinants of health. Webb Hooper's group was the first to conduct a randomized intervention study of tobacco use in African Americans that effectively delineated a method to create culturally specific interventions with demonstrated long-term success. Her work highlights the importance of moving beyond one-size-fits-all approaches, particularly for behavioral interventions involving health disparity populations.

Webb Hooper's program of community engaged research focuses on understanding multilevel factors and biopsychosocial mechanisms underlying modifiable risk factors, such as tobacco use and stress processes, and the development of community responsive and culturally specific interventions. Her goal is to contribute to the body of scientific knowledge and disseminate findings into communities with high need.

== Personal life ==
Webb Hooper is married and has three children.
