= Fight for Sight =

Fight for Sight may refer to:

- Fight for Sight (U.S.), an American organization
- Fight for Sight (UK), a British organization
