= Otelia Shields Howard =

American professor

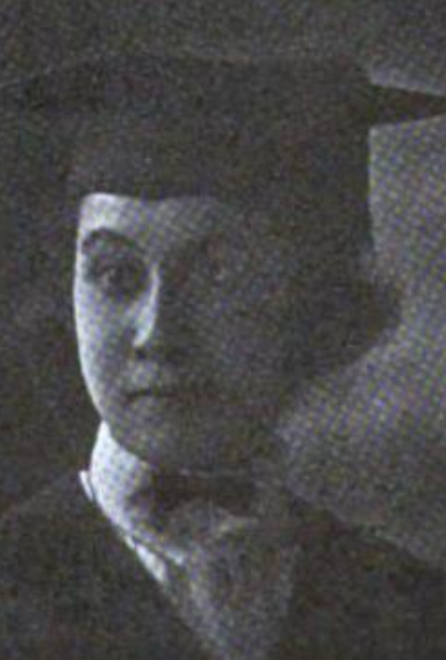
- Otelia Shields, from a 1921 graduation photograph in The Crisis
- Born: Otelia Roberta Shields; September 15, 1900; Petersburg, Virginia
- Died: December 13, 1945 (aged 45); Petersburg, Virginia
- Education: Fisk University (BA); Columbia University (MA)
- Occupation: English professor
- Relatives: Audrey S. Penn (niece)

Otelia Roberta Shields Howard (September 15, 1900 – December 13, 1945) was an American professor of English. She taught more than twenty years at Virginia State College, and founded the school's newspaper, the Virginia Statesman.

== Early life and education ==
Otelia Roberta Shields was born in Petersburg, Virginia, the daughter of James E. Shields and Otelia Jones Shields. Her father, a school principal, was a member of the first graduating class at the Virginia Normal and Collegiate Institute in 1886. She trained as a teacher at the Virginia Normal and Collegiate Institute, then attended Fisk University, where she was a member of the Fisk Pageant Singers and earned a bachelor's degree in English with high honors in 1921. She earned a master's degree from Columbia University in 1926.

Her brother, James E. Shields Jr., was a physician trained at Howard University. Neurologist Audrey S. Penn is her niece.

== Career ==
Shields was a charter member of the Virginia State graduate chapter of Alpha Kappa Alpha, and president of the local YWCA. During World War I, as part of her work with the YWCA, she organized the Committee on Girls' Welfare and Women's Work of the Camp Lee War Council in Petersburg.

Howard taught more than twenty years at her alma mater, which was renamed Virginia State College, beginning as an instructor in 1921, and becoming an associate professor several years later. She founded the school's honor society and its newspaper, the Virginia Statesman in 1929. In 1930 she began offering the Shields-Howard Award, an annual student award for creative writing. She also edited the Virginia State College Gazette and Catalogue, and directed student plays, including a production of A Doll's House in 1928.

== Personal life ==
Otelia Shields married biology professor Roscoe Conklin Howard in 1936. Otelia Shields Howard died in 1945, in Petersburg, from complications related to multiple sclerosis. A special "In Memoriam" edition of the Virginia Statesman was published in her memory, in March 1846. Her prize was continued, just renamed the Shields Howard Memorial Award for Creative Literature. Howard Hall, a women's dormitory named for her at Virginia State University, was built in the 1960s and demolished in 2010.
