= Anna María Nápoles =

American behavioral epidemiologist and science administrator

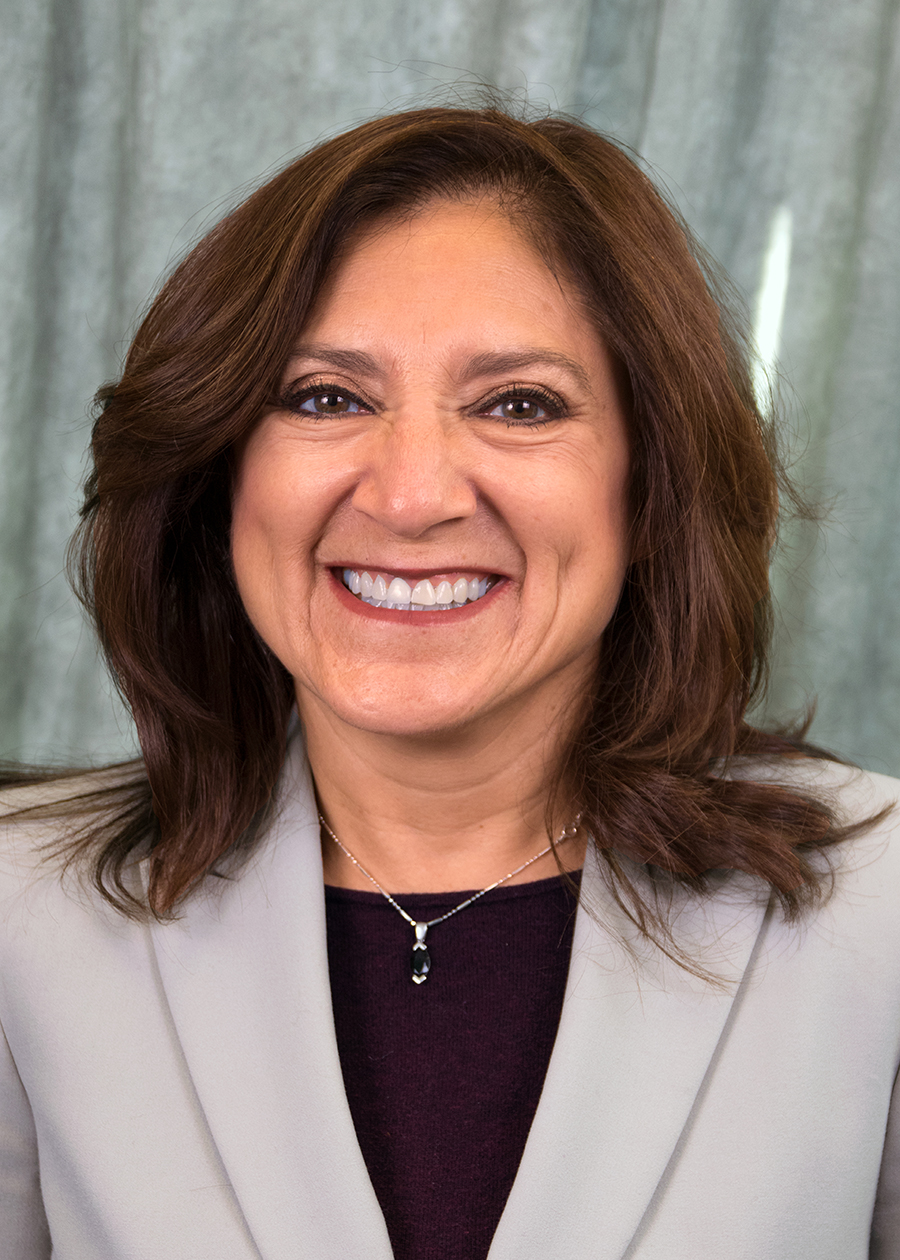
- Education: Pomona College (B.A.); University of California, Berkeley (M.P.H., Ph.D.)
- Scientific career
- Workplaces: University of California San Francisco; National Institute on Minority Health and Health Disparities

Anna María Nápoles is an American behavioral epidemiologist and science administrator. She was the scientific director of the Intramural Research Program at the National Institute on Minority Health and Health Disparities. She was a professor and epidemiologist at University of California, San Francisco.

== Education ==
Nápoles completed a Bachelor of Arts at Pomona College. She obtained her Ph.D. and M.P.H. degrees from the University of California, Berkeley.

== Career ==
Beginning in 2001, Nápoles was a Professor and behavioral epidemiologist in the Department of Medicine, Division of General Internal Medicine, at the University of California, San Francisco (UCSF) for 27 years, where she served as the Director of the UCSF Center for Aging in Diverse Communities (CADC). CADC is an NIA-funded Resource Center for Minority Aging Research that provides pilot study funding and intensive mentoring to underrepresented early stage investigators focused on aging, minorities, and health disparities. She taught health disparities research methods for over 10 years. She assumed the position of Scientific Director of the Intramural Research Program at the National Institute on Minority Health and Health Disparities (NIMHD) in November 2017. She is the first Latina named to the position at the National Institutes of Health.

== Research ==
Nápoles' research program has focused on eliminating health inequalities related to cancer treatment and survivorship, self-care behaviors and physician-patient communication. Her goal is to develop effective socio-behavioral interventions to address these disparities, while contributing to the advancement of scientific methods for their study. Much of her work has utilized community-based participatory research methods to maximize the relevance and utility of her research for end-users. She uses integrated quantitative and qualitative (mixed) research methods to explore mechanisms of health disparities and develop measures and interventions. Her research falls into three interrelated categories: 1) cancer control in underserved populations; 2) interpersonal processes of care; and 3) health disparities research methods. She has published over 75 journal articles.

=== Cancer control research in underserved populations ===
Nápoles' work in this area has spanned the cancer care continuum, studying disparities in relevant lifestyle factors, utilization of cancer early detection examinations, treatment disparities, and survivorship. Working with multiple community groups, she has developed a program of research on cancer survivorship among Latinos and other low-income groups. This work has identified a sense of self-efficacy in managing one's cancer, spirituality, and family support as important protective factors among Latina breast cancer survivors. This work has included community-based RCTs of a peer-delivered cognitive-behavioral stress management intervention they developed for urban and rural Latinas with breast cancer called Nuevo Amanecer that improved quality of life and reduced depressive and somatic symptoms. She is developing and testing mHealth plus health coaching interventions to improve symptom management among ethnically diverse, low-income cancer survivors through cognitive-behavioral stress management, physical activity, and survivorship care planning. Her work in this area contributes to addressing ethnic and socioeconomic disparities in cancer survivorship, a grossly understudied area of research.

=== Interpersonal processes of care (IPC) in diverse populations ===
She co-developed a conceptual framework and patient survey to assess the quality of the IPC that includes the perspectives of diverse patients. This work is facilitating studies of associations between IPC and disparities in technical processes and outcomes of health care. She expanded this work by developing a conceptual framework and measures of clinicians' cultural sensitivity and has developed clinician-reported measures of the quality of interpretation that were used to compare various modes of language interpretation. She developed new measures of patient-reported quality of communication related to colorectal cancer (CRC) screening and found that these scales, which assessed clinicians' explanations of CRC risks and screening tests, elicitation of patients' CRC screening barriers, and responsiveness to patients' CRC screening concerns, were associated positively with colorectal cancer screening among Latino general medicine patients. She analyzed audio-taped encounters of limited English-proficient patients and their clinicians to assess the extent and clinical significance of errors in interpretation and found that errors occur frequently in these encounters, and more often in ad-hoc than professional in-person and professional video-conferencing interpreted visits. These studies have expanded our measures of patient-centered care (one of the six domains of quality of care identified by the Institute of Medicine), and suggest interventions to reduce ethnic disparities in health care processes and outcomes.

=== Health disparities research measures and methods ===
Her work seeks to advance research methods for effective engagement of ethnically diverse communities in clinical research, including translation of evidence-based behavioral interventions in diverse communities. These studies address the effectiveness of recruitment and retention methods, measurement issues when comparing self-reported health measures across and within diverse ethnic groups, development of new survey measures to test mechanisms that might explain disparities, and critical reviews of methods for translation of evidence-based programs into ethnically diverse communities. These articles constitute important methodological resources for health disparities researchers.

== Awards and honors ==
In 2003 and 2005, Nápoles received the Rising Star in Cancer Research Award from the Redes En Acción Network, and is a 2016 Susan G. Komen Scholar.

== See also ==
- Kelvin Choi
