= Maria Hatzoglou =

- Education: University of Thessaloniki, B.S. University of Athens, Ph.D.
- Known for: Research on Endoplasmic reticulum stress response; integrated stress response; translational control
- Scientific career
- Fields: Molecular biology; cell biology; translational control
- Workplaces: Case Western Reserve University

Maria Hatzoglou is a molecular biologist and professor in the Department of Genetics and Genome Sciences at the Case Western Reserve University School of Medicine. Her research work has focused on the cellular stress response, particularly endoplasmic reticulum (ER) stress, the integrated stress response (ISR), and the translational control of gene expression and its implications for cancer, diabetes, and neurodegenerative disease.

== Education ==
Hatzoglou received a degree in chemistry from the University of Thessaloniki in 1981. She completed her Ph.D. at the University of Athens in 1985, working on the structure and function of heterogeneous nuclear ribonucleoproteins and on RNA splicing. She subsequently undertook postdoctoral training in the Department of Biochemistry at Case Western Reserve University, studying the regulation of gene expression of retrovirus-borne genes following infection of cells.

== Career ==
Hatzoglou joined the faculty of the Department of Nutrition at Case Western Reserve University in 1991. She is a professor in the Department of Genetics and Genome Sciences at the School of Medicine and holds an appointment in nutrition, and is affiliated with the Center for RNA Science and Therapeutics. She is a member of the Molecular Oncology Program at the Case Comprehensive Cancer Center.

== Research ==
Hatzoglou's group has characterized mechanisms of translational control and metabolic regulation during cellular stress. She co-authored studies of how ISR adaptive pathways are exploited by cancer cells to support metastasis and tumor growth. Additionally, she described how chronic ER stress can increase protein synthesis in a manner that contributes to cell death.

Hatzoglou has worked on the regulation of amino acid transport and cellular adaptation to osmotic stress. Her work has examined the regulation of the neutral amino acid transporter SNAT2 and the phosphatase regulatory subunit GADD34 in adaptation to increased extracellular osmolarity. She described an osmoadaptation mechanism in which coordinated regulation of GADD34 and the amino acid transporter SNAT2 enables cellular adaptation to increased extracellular osmolarity. In 2011, she received an NIH R37 Award for her project "Translational Control by Osmotically Active Solutes".

In 2025, Hatzoglou authored a study in Nature describing the "split integrated stress response" (s-ISR), in which she and her collaborators reported that ISR signaling exhibits substantial plasticity rather than functioning as a linear binary switch. She further added that the integrated stress response can be fine-tuned according to the nature, intensity, and duration of stress. The work used mouse models of vanishing white matter disease and suggested that similar stress-adaptation mechanisms may operate in other neurodegenerative disorders, including multiple sclerosis and amyotrophic lateral sclerosis.

In a series of papers, Hatzoglou participated as a collaborator in studies that presented translational reprogramming as a driver of cancer cell plasticity. A 2020 study linked selective mRNA translation under hypoxic conditions to increased breast cancer cell plasticity, thereby promoting cellular state transitions associated with metastasis and reduced treatment sensitivity. In 2021, she reported that the integrated stress response is a key driver of KRAS-driven lung tumorigenesis and that inhibiting it substantially reduced tumor growth. As a lead author of the study, she showed that insulin-producing β-cells can lose and subsequently regain their mature identity in response to chronic ER stress following stress relief, with implications for the progression of type 1 diabetes.
