= Paula Braveman =

American academic and health equity researcher

Paula A. Braveman
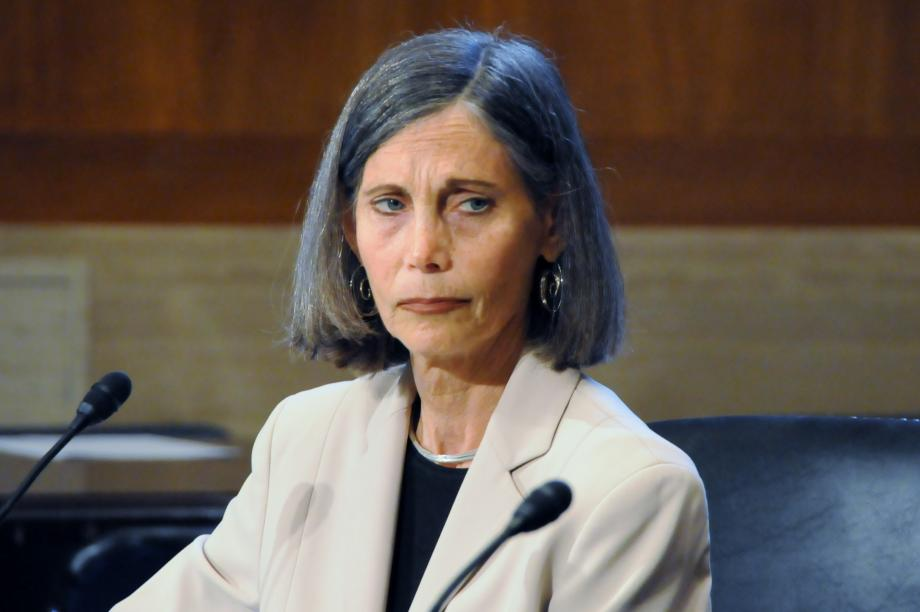
- Occupations: Physician, Researcher
- Known for: Defining health equity

Academic background
- Education: MD, MPH
- Alma mater: Swarthmore, University of California San Francisco, University of California Berkeley

Academic work
- Discipline: Public Health
- Sub-discipline: Epidemiology
- Institutions: University of California San Francisco
- Main interests: Social determinants of health

Paula A. Braveman is an American researcher of health equity and the social determinants of health. She implemented a global initiative focused on health equity while working for the World Health Organization. Braveman is a Professor Emeritus of Family and Community Medicine and the University of Californian, San Francisco. She was elected to the Institute of Medicine of the National Academy of Sciences in 2002.

== Early life and education ==
Braveman grew up in Boston and Miami. Her family lived in lower-income and working-class neighborhoods. Her father worked selling advertising for newspapers. Her family includes an older brother.

She earned an undergraduate degree from Swarthmore College where she majored in Philosophy. After graduating in 1970, she hitchhiked across United States and Canada with her boyfriend for four months. When they ran out of money, she took a job with a temp agency and was assigned to a "hippie clinic" for at-risk youth.

She earned her M.D. from the University of California, San Francisco in 1979. And, in 1986, she completed an MPH with a focus on epidemiology from the University of California, Berkeley.

== Career ==
Braveman held roles as a clinical physician in hospitals and health centers in San Francisco. She worked to support public health in Central America in the 1980s by collaborating with the Nicaraguan Ministry of Health and the Pan American Health Organization. In the 1990s, she worked with the World Health Organization to improve the public health of low- and middle-income countries. She also led work at the Robert Wood Johnson Foundation (RWJF) that, among other outcomes, resulted in a definition of health equity. In further work for RWJF, Braveman highlighted the role of education as a social determinant of health.

Braveman attributes an interest in improving social justice as a motivation for her research. Her research has examined how racism contributes to disparities in health of women and their children. In an early, influential, 1989 journal article, Braveman established in that newborns with mothers without insured prenatal care were more likely to have adverse health outcomes. In a later, 2011, paper she contributed to defining the term "health equity". Her recent work includes the most read article for 2022 in the journal Health Affairs.

Braveman was elected to the National Academy of Medicine in 2002. She has served on the Advisory Council of the National Institute on Minority Health and Health Disparities and committees for other federal agencies. In 2011, she spoke before the U.S. Senate Committee on Health, Education, Labor and Pensions on the topic of poverty and health.

== Selected works ==
- Braveman, P; Oliva, G; Miller, MG; Reiter, R; Egerter, S (1989). "Adverse outcomes and lack of health insurance among newborns in an eight-county area of California, 1982 to 1986". N Engl J Med. 321: 508–13. doi:10.1056/NEJM198908243210805. PMID 2761588.
- Braveman, PA; Kumanyika, S; Fielding, J; Laveist, T; Borrell, LN; Manderscheid, R; Troutman, A (2011). "Health disparities and health equity: the issue is justice". Am J Public Health. 101 Suppl 1: S149-55. doi:10.2105/AJPH.2010.300062. PMC 3222512. PMID 21551385.
- Braveman, PA; Arkin, E; Proctor, D; Kauh, T; Holm, N (2022). "Systemic And Structural Racism: Definitions, Examples, Health Damages, And Approaches To Dismantling". Health Aff (Millwood). 41: 171–178. doi:10.1377/hlthaff.2021.01394. PMID 35130057.
