= Walter Koroshetz =

American neurologist

Walter J. Koroshetz
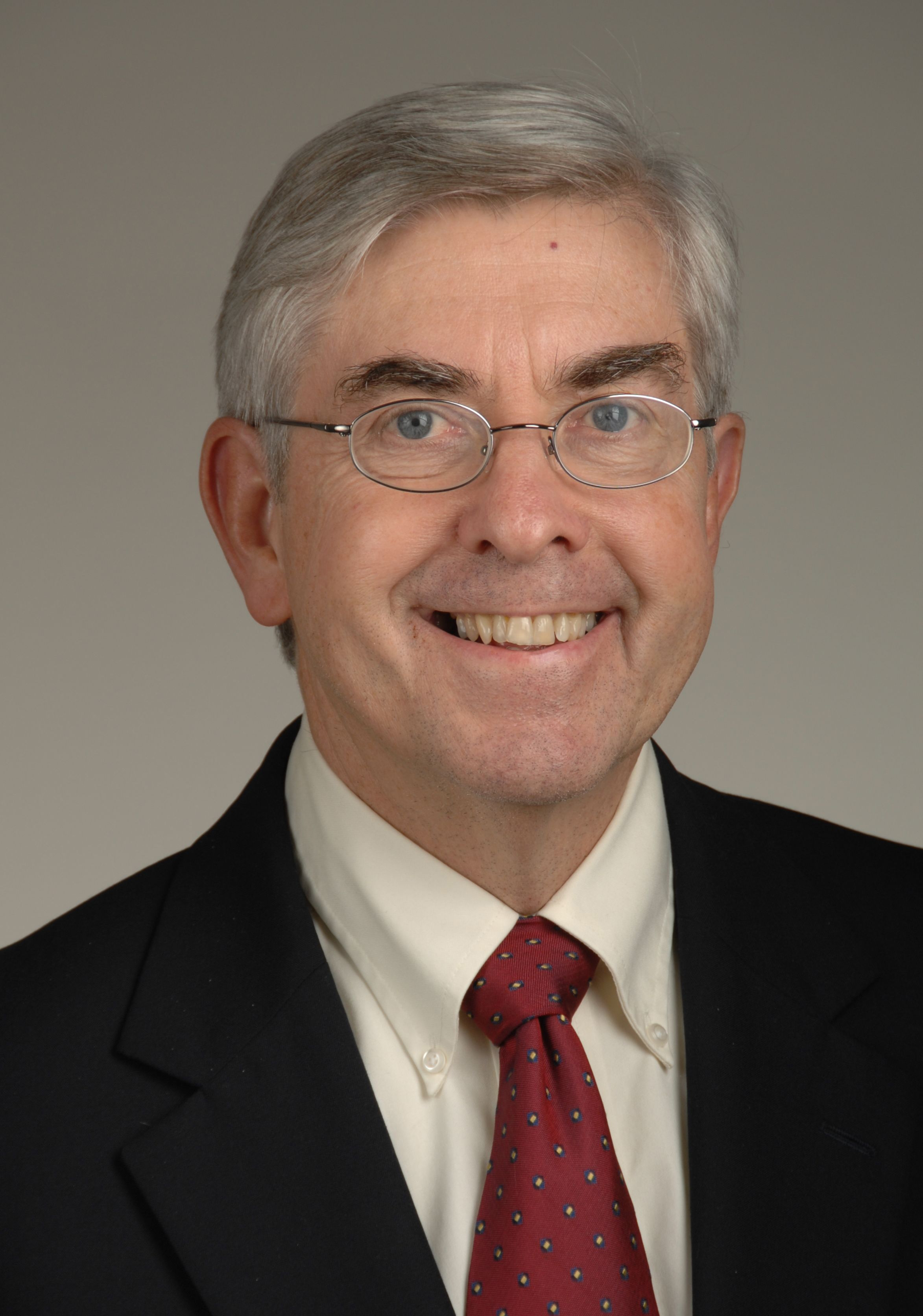
- Born: Brooklyn, New York, US
- Education: Georgetown University (BASc); University of Chicago (MD)
- Occupations: Neurologist; Neuroscientist
- Office: 9th director of the National Institute of Neurological Disorders and Stroke (NINDS)
- Term: 2014–2015 (acting); 2015–2026 (director)
- Predecessor: Story Landis
- Successor: Amy Bany Adams (acting)

Walter J. Koroshetz is an American neurologist who served as the director of the National Institute of Neurological Disorders and Stroke (NINDS) from 2015 to 2026. During his tenure, he had leadership roles in several major cross-institute programs at the NIH, including the Brain Research Through Advancing Innovative Neurotechnologies (BRAIN) Initiative, aimed at advancing understanding of the human brain through innovative biotechnologies; the HEAL Initiative/Helping to End Addiction Longterm (HEAL) Initiative, the AMP/Accelerated Medicine Programs(AMP) for amyotrophic lateral sclerosis and Parkinson's Disease.

In 2026, Koroshetz was ousted from NINDS, prompting concern in the medical community about the instability and politicization of the National Institutes of Health (NIH) under the second Trump administration.

== Early life and education ==
Koroshetz has said that his interest in the brain began in the eighth or ninth grade after reading about action potentialss and ion channels in a book on psychiatry. He was also influenced by seeing his father's six-month hospitalization due to Guillain–Barré syndrome, a rare autoimmune neurological disease.

Starting in 1971, Koroshetz attended Georgetown University as an undergraduate. During two of the summers, he worked in the laboratory of Jorge Fischbarg, a physiologist at Columbia University. There, he studied ion transport, an interest he continued to pursue at the University of Chicago's Pritzker School of Medicine in the laboratory of /Dr. Ramon Latorre.

Koroshetz began his residency at the University of Chicago in internal medicine. During his second year, he read a paper by C. Miller Fisher, a Canadian-born neurologist, and decided to move to the Massachusetts General Hospital (MGH), where Fisher worked. He completed a second residency there, this time in neurology, followed by postdoctoral studies in cellular neurophysiology in the laboratory of Dr. David Corey. He also did postdoctoral studies in neurobiology with Dr. Edward Furshpan at Harvard Medical School.

== Career ==
=== Early career ===
Koroshetz was a professor of neurology at Harvard Medical School and vice chair of neurology at MGH. He also directed stroke and neurointensive care, and he led resident training at MGH from 1990 to 2007. His research laboratory work focused on excitatory toxicity and potential neuroprotective mechanisms. His early clinical research concentrated on Huntington's disease, including genetic testing, magnetic resonance spectroscopy, and clinical trials. Later he worked to develop acute neuroimaging via magnetic resonance imaging (MRI) and computed tomography (CT) scanning for acute stroke imaging and as a means to identify persons who might benefit from intra-arterial clot lysis. Working within the American Heart Association and the American Association of Neurology he helped to revolutionize acute stroke care across the US.

=== NINDS ===
In 2007, Koroshetz joined NINDS as deputy director, and in October 2014, he became the acting director. During his deputy directorship and acting directorship, he played a significant role in the creation of NIH StrokeNet, a clinical trial network that streamlines the process of running large clinical trials across many hospitals. He also played a large role in the creation of the NIH Office of Emergency Research. He co-chaired the Brain Research Through Advancing Innovative Neurotechnologies (BRAIN) Initiative, a collaborative, public-private research initiative which is aimed at advancing understanding of the human brain through the development of innovative biotechnologies. Koroshetz has described the initiative, which also aims to help researchers uncover the neurological causes of brain disorders like depression, as "merging the fields of neurology and psychiatry."

In June 2015, the NIH named Koroshetz permanent director of NINDS. During his time at NINDS, he held leadership roles in initiatives supporting research in many areas, including addiction, chronic pain, ALS, traumatic brain injuries, long COVID, undiagnosed diseases, and somatic gene editing.

At the end of Koroshetz's second five-year term, an NIH review panel recommended his reappointment, and NIH director Jay Bhattacharya gave his endorsement. Despite this, under the second Trump administration, the NIH allowed his contract to end on January 24, 2026. As a result, 40 neuroscience organizations, led by the American Academy of Neurology, sent a joint letter to members of Congress expressing "significant concern" and urging Congress to exercise closer oversight over leadership changes.

=== Post-NINDS career ===
In 2026, Koroshetz became a senior advisor for the Dana Foundation, a philanthropic organization with a focus on the role of neuroscience in society, as well as the Invisible Wounds Foundation, which focuses on military brain injuries.

In an April 2026 interview, Koroshetz expressed concern about whether "good people" would still take jobs at the NIH after the layoffs there. He said it would be "a tragedy" if the leaders of the institutes, which he said had always been nonpolitical, were replaced by political appointees, and expressed a willingness to return to government work if asked by a future administration.
