= Kelvin Choi =

American social and behavioral epidemiologist

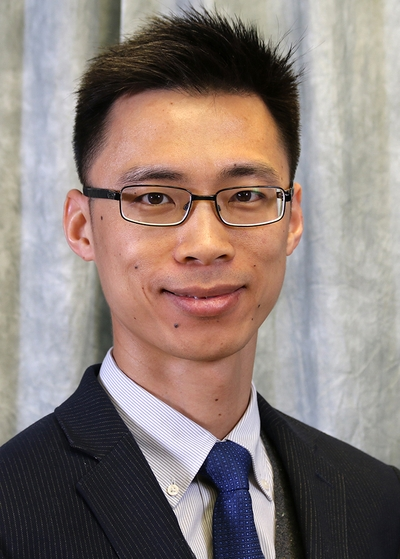
- Education: University of Minnesota
- Scientific career
- Fields: Social and behavioral epidemiology, tobacco use
- Workplaces: University of Minnesota; National Institutes of Health

Kelvin Choi is an American social and behavioral epidemiologist serving as the scientific director for the division of intramural research at the National Institute on Minority Health and Health Disparities (NIMHD) since 2024. He researches tobacco use behaviors, health disparities, and the impact of tobacco marketing on vulnerable populations.

== Education ==
Choi earned a B.Sc. in physiotherapy. He completed a M.P.H. in community health education and Ph.D. in social and behavioral epidemiology at the University of Minnesota.

== Career ==
Choi was an assistant professor in the division of epidemiology and community health at the University of Minnesota School of Public Health University of Minnesota.

In 2013, Choi joined the division of intramural research (DIR) at National Institute on Minority Health and Health Disparities as a Stadtman Tenure-Track Investigator. He obtained tenure at National Institutes of Health (NIH) in 2019 and promoted to senior investigator in 2021. Choi heads the tobacco related disparities and control lab in the DIR social and behavioral sciences branch. He studies how social determinants and marketing influence tobacco use and evaluates interventions to reduce related health disparities. He became a fellow of the Society for Research on Nicotine and Tobacco in 2022.

In March 2023, Choi succeed Anna María Nápoles as acting DIR scientific director. He permanently assumed the role on November 17, 2024, becoming its third scientific director.
