= David Pressman (disambiguation) =

David Pressman may refer to:

- David Pressman (born 1977), American lawyer and ambassador
- David Pressman (scientist) (1916-1980), American immunologist
- David Pressman (actor) (born 1965), American actor who starred in Mr. Sunshine
