= Mildred Weisenfeld =

American activist

Fight for Sight - National Council to Combat Blindness Founder, Mildred Weisenfeld

Mildred Mosler Weisenfeld (1921 – December 6, 1997) is the Brooklyn-born founder of national not-for-profit foundation the National Council to Combat Blindness in 1946, now known as Fight for Sight, an organization based in New York City that provides initial funds to promising scientists early in their careers. For 50 years, Weisenfeld was a one-woman campaign to increase funding for eye research, despite losing her own vision and having no scientific training.

== Background ==
At age 15, Weisenfeld began to lose her vision to degenerative eye disease retinitis pigmentosa (RP). Although she completed high school and went on to Brooklyn College, her eyesight worsened and her treatment options were few despite visiting more than 100 specialists in the U.S. and Europe. Weisenfeld was surprised to find that most eye and vision funding went into care for the blind rather than treatments or research. As she continued to search for treatment, she was urged by many of the eye specialists to encourage funding of research for eye disease, which totaled just a few thousand annually around World War II. By age 23, her sight was completely lost.

In 1946, 10 years after she was diagnosed with retinitis pigmentosa, Weisenfeld founded the National Council to Combat Blindness (NCCB), New York, at age 25 with $8 and no office.

Addressing how other nonprofits focused on adjusting people to their condition of vision problems, Weisenfeld was quoted May 23, 1948, in the New York Mirror as saying "something must be done beyond giving them a dog, a cane, or a Braille book. We must give those who need it the hope that science is actively probing the affliction robbing them of their sight." Weisenfeld herself never learned Braille or used a cane or a guide dog.

Known for her audacity (friends would call it chutzpah), Weisenfeld helped put vision research on the national agenda when she coordinated testimony on eye research before the House in 1949, which led Congress to recognize eye disease and create the National Institute of Neurological Disease and Blindness, and the 1968 establishment of the National Eye Institute in the National Institutes of Health.

Over the decades as Fight for Sight's executive director, Weisenfeld paid herself no salary (she lived on family money) and tirelessly worked six- or seven-day weeks to raise millions of dollars for research and launch the careers of many prominent vision researchers through Fight for Sight and its local women's leagues in New York (Manhattan; Brooklyn: Park Circle, Bensonhurst, Shorefront; Queens: North Shore, Seaside; Bronx, Long Island), Northern NJ, Pennsylvania (Philadelphia: Greater, Main Line, Cheltenham, and Northeast) and Florida (South Palm Beach, Hollywood, Delray, Deerfield Beach, Miami). Fight for Sight celebrates its 65th anniversary in 2011.

== 1950s ==
Weisenfeld was well connected with numerous celebrities and politicians to draw attention to her organization and its annual fundraiser the "Lights On" variety show from 1949 into the early 1990s, first led by Milton Berle, and later included Bob Hope, Barbra Streisand, Sammy Davis Junior, Stevie Wonder, Liza Minnelli, Earl Wilson (columnist), Harry Belafonte, Ed Sullivan, Fannie Hurst, Pearl Bailey, Mel Allen, Peter Falk, Yul Brynner, Paul Anka, Eartha Kitt, Jackie Mason, Tommy Smothers, Joe Frazier, Jerry Stiller, Carol Channing, Tony Randall, Peggy Lee, and many others.

Along with blind Attorney General William E. Powers, Weisenfeld presented an original Norman Rockwell painting to President Harry Truman on September 19, 1950, as an honor for his signing of legislation aiding the blind.

Also in 1950, working with wealthy New York entrepreneur Mary Lasker, Weisenfeld encouraged the addition of the word "blindness" to the founding title of The National Institute of Neurological Disorders and Blindness (NINDB), now the National Institute of Neurological Disorders and Stroke.

According to the New York World-Telegram & Sun in a 1954 interview with Weisenfeld, $150 million was spent in the U.S. annually by private and public funds to support the blind, but just $1.35 million on eye research.

Albert G. Mosler, a Philadelphia businessman, contacted Fight for Sight after discovering that he was losing his sight to retinitis pigmentosa and read about the organization in a newspaper. He soon met and married Weisenfeld in 1956, but they didn't have children. Mosler died 11 years later.

== 1960s ==
Bob Hope, who became honorary chairman of her organization, helped attract many notable celebrities for the annual "Lights On" fundraiser and donated $100,000 in 1960 to establish the Bob Hope Fight for Sight Fund.

Focusing partly on children, up to eight clinics carried the name of Weisenfeld's organization from combined donations exceeding $13 million. They were the Fight for Sight Children's Eye Centers in New York (the first in 1960 at Columbia-Presbyterian Medical Center, then another with funding from billionaire Harry B. and Leona Helmsley at Mount Sinai Hospital in the mid-1990s), Miami (Bascom Palmer Eye Institute), two in Pittsburgh (Children's Hospital of Pittsburgh and St. Christopher's Hospital for Children), Philadelphia (Wills Eye Hospital), and Newark, NJ (Eye Institute of New Jersey, UMDNJ-University of Medicine and Dentistry of New Jersey).

== Honors ==
Many honors were bestowed upon Weisenfeld in tribute to her lifelong work. In 1951, Weisenfeld was presented with the Eleanor Roosevelt Award for community service. On the 25th anniversary of Fight for Sight in 1971, President Richard Nixon and New York City Mayor John Lindsay recognized Weisenfeld's work with congratulatory letters. In 1975, the Academy of Ophthalmology awarded Weisenfeld its first award given to a lay person, for her contributions to the field. The industry group ARVO (Association of Research in Vision and Ophthalmology) established the Weisenfeld Award for Excellence in Ophthalmology in 1986, to recognize individuals for scholarly contributions to clinical ophthalmology. On Fight for Sight's 50th anniversary, Weisenfeld received the Lighthouse Pisart Vision Award in 1996 for her leadership and accomplishments. In 2000, Columbia University's Harkness Eye Institute Children's Diagnostic Clinic was renamed the Fight for Sight/Mildred Weisenfeld Children's Diagnostic Clinic.

Fight for Sight was led by Weisenfeld for 50 years, until she fell into ill health in 1996. An avid smoker, Weisenfeld died a year later at age 76 from complications of lung cancer.
