= Herman Eisen =

American immunologist and cancer researcher

Herman Nathaniel Eisen
- Born: October 15, 1918; Brooklyn, New York, U.S.
- Died: November 2, 2014 (aged 96); Cambridge, Massachusetts, U.S.
- Education: New York University
- Awards: American Academy of Arts and Sciences (1965); National Academy of Sciences (1969); Institute of Medicine (1974)
- Scientific career
- Fields: Immunology, cancer biology
- Institutions: New York University; Washington University in St. Louis; Massachusetts Institute of Technology

Herman Nathaniel Eisen (October 15, 1918 – November 2, 2014) was an American immunologist and cancer researcher. He served on the faculty at New York University School of Medicine in the early 1950s, became the Chief of Dermatology at the Washington University School of Medicine in 1955, and was a founding member of the MIT Center for Cancer Research (now called the Koch Institute for Integrative Cancer Research). Eisen retired and assumed professor emeritus status in 1989, but continued to be active as a researcher; he was working on a manuscript the day he died in 2014.

== Early life and education ==
Eisen was born in Brooklyn, New York, in 1918, one of four children of Jewish immigrants from Eastern Europe. His undergraduate studies at New York University began in 1934 but were interrupted by a case of tuberculosis, which required him to withdraw from school for a year; he later recalled this as a key event in his life inspiring him to focus on intellectual activities. After graduation in 1939, he began as a medical student at NYU and received his Doctor of Medicine degree in 1943. He worked briefly as an assistant in pathology at Columbia University, where he was first exposed to immunology research by Michael Heidelberger. He then returned to NYU again for his residency. Eisen was one of the first recipients of a new form of National Institutes of Health fellowship for physician-scientists, which supported further work at NYU with Fred Karush studying antibodies. Eisen next moved to Sloan-Kettering to work with David Pressman and left after a year to return to NYU as a faculty member.

== Academic career ==
Eisen's first faculty position was at NYU in the then-new Department of Industrial Medicine, where he was funded to work part-time as a researcher and invest the remainder of his time in clinical practice. He found this combination unsustainable and therefore was receptive when approached by Barry Wood to recruit him to Washington University School of Medicine as the Chief of Dermatology there. Eisen moved to Washington University in 1955 and spent five years in the position before moving to the department of microbiology and serving as its chair. Following the National Cancer Act of 1971, Salvador Luria recruited Eisen to become one of the founding members of MIT's new Center for Cancer Research, where Eisen would spend the rest of his career. Eisen officially retired in 1989, assuming professor emeritus status, but remained active in research and in mentoring younger scientists in the MIT community. During this time he worked with a number of MIT colleagues on their ongoing projects, including Jianzhu Chen and Arup Chakraborty.

Eisen was elected a fellow of the American Academy of Arts and Sciences in 1965, a member of the National Academy of Sciences in 1969, and a member of the Institute of Medicine in 1974. He served as the president of the American Association of Immunologists in 1968–69 and received the organization's Lifetime Achievement Award in 1997.

== Research ==
Eisen's research is regarded as foundational in the field of immunology. After his death, he was remembered as "the last of the great immunochemists". He is particularly well known for his studies of affinity maturation of antibodies beginning in the late 1950s while he was at Washington University. Much of this work was conducted with postdoctoral fellow Lisa Steiner, who went on to become the first woman in the MIT Department of Biology. In the 1980s Eisen changed research interests from a focus on antibodies to a focus on T cells and cell-mediated immunity.

== Personal life ==
Eisen's wife Natalie was also a physician and practiced as a pediatrician in New York, served as assistant director of Bellevue Hospital in St. Louis, and then practiced at the Harvard Street Neighborhood Health Center in Boston. The couple had five children. Eisen remained an active research scientist for many years following his official retirement and was working on a manuscript related to antibody affinity the day he died in 2014.
