= National Institute of Neurological Disorders and Stroke =

U.S. health institute

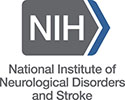
- Organization logo
- Abbreviation: NINDS
- Formation: 1950
- Type: U.S. government agency
- Legal status: Active
- Purpose: "NINDS conducts and supports research on brain and nervous system disorders."
- Headquarters: Bethesda, Maryland
- Region served: United States
- Official language: English
- Acting director: Amy Bany Adams, Ph.D.
- Parent organization: National Institutes of Health
- Affiliations: United States Public Health Service
- Website: ninds.nih.gov

The National Institute of Neurological Disorders and Stroke (NINDS) is a part of the U.S. National Institutes of Health (NIH). It conducts and funds research on brain and nervous system disorders and has a budget of just over US$2.03 billion. The mission of NINDS is "to reduce the burden of neurological disease—a burden borne by every age group, every segment of society, and people all over the world". NINDS has established two major branches for research: an extramural branch that funds studies outside the NIH, and an intramural branch that funds research inside the NIH. Most of NINDS' budget goes to fund extramural research. NINDS' basic science research focuses on studies of the fundamental biology of the brain and nervous system, genetics, neurodegeneration, learning and memory, motor control, brain repair, and synapses. NINDS also funds clinical research related to diseases and disorders of the brain and nervous system, e.g. AIDS, Alzheimer's disease, epilepsy, muscular dystrophy, multiple sclerosis, Parkinson's disease, spinal cord injury, stroke, and traumatic brain injury.

Established in 1950 by the U. S. Congress as the National Institute of Neurological Diseases and Blindness to help handle the casualties of World War II, NINDS grew along with the NIH. During the 1950s and 1960s, NINDS and the NIH had strong Congressional support and received significant appropriations. However, this funding declined in 1968.

== History ==
=== Impetus for creation ===
The NINDS was created in 1950 to study and treat the neurological and psychiatric casualties of World War II. Many service people had returned with serious brain injuries, nerve damage, and psychological trauma. According to one estimate, "neurologically disabled veterans in the postwar years accounted for about 25 percent of the patients in general hospitals and 10 percent of those in psychiatric hospitals". In addition, 1.7 million American men had been rejected for military service due to a neuropsychiatric condition or learning disorder.

NINDS was also created as part of an effort to "revive the almost extinct neurological field". At the time, psychiatry and its focus on "emotional tensions due to interpersonal, social, and cultural maladjustments" held sway in US medicine, while neurology, with its focus on the inner workings of the brain, had fallen out of favor. During WWII, all of the administrative positions of the American Board of Psychiatry and Neurology held by the US armed services were filled by psychiatrists. After the war, a survey by the Veteran's Administration of the members of the American Board of Psychiatry and Neurology found that 48 were neurologists and 456 were psychiatrists.

In 1948, Abe B. Baker, chair of neurology and psychiatry at the University of Minnesota, formed the American Academy of Neurology (AAN) to give young neurologists a national organization to join. However, sustained research in neurology was not possible without a national institute. In the late 1940s and early 1950s, vocal American Neurological Association (ANA) members testified before Congress, arguing that there needed to be such an institute. They articulated the arguments which had already been made on a smaller scale by citizens' groups for diseases such as multiple sclerosis, cerebral palsy, muscular dystrophy, epilepsy, and blindness.

Members of the research grants committee of the National Institute of Mental Health (NIMH), which had been founded in 1949, contend that they also helped provide an impetus for the new institute, as when reviewing grant applications they saw a significant number of neurological projects and proposed a separate institute for them.

=== Creation ===
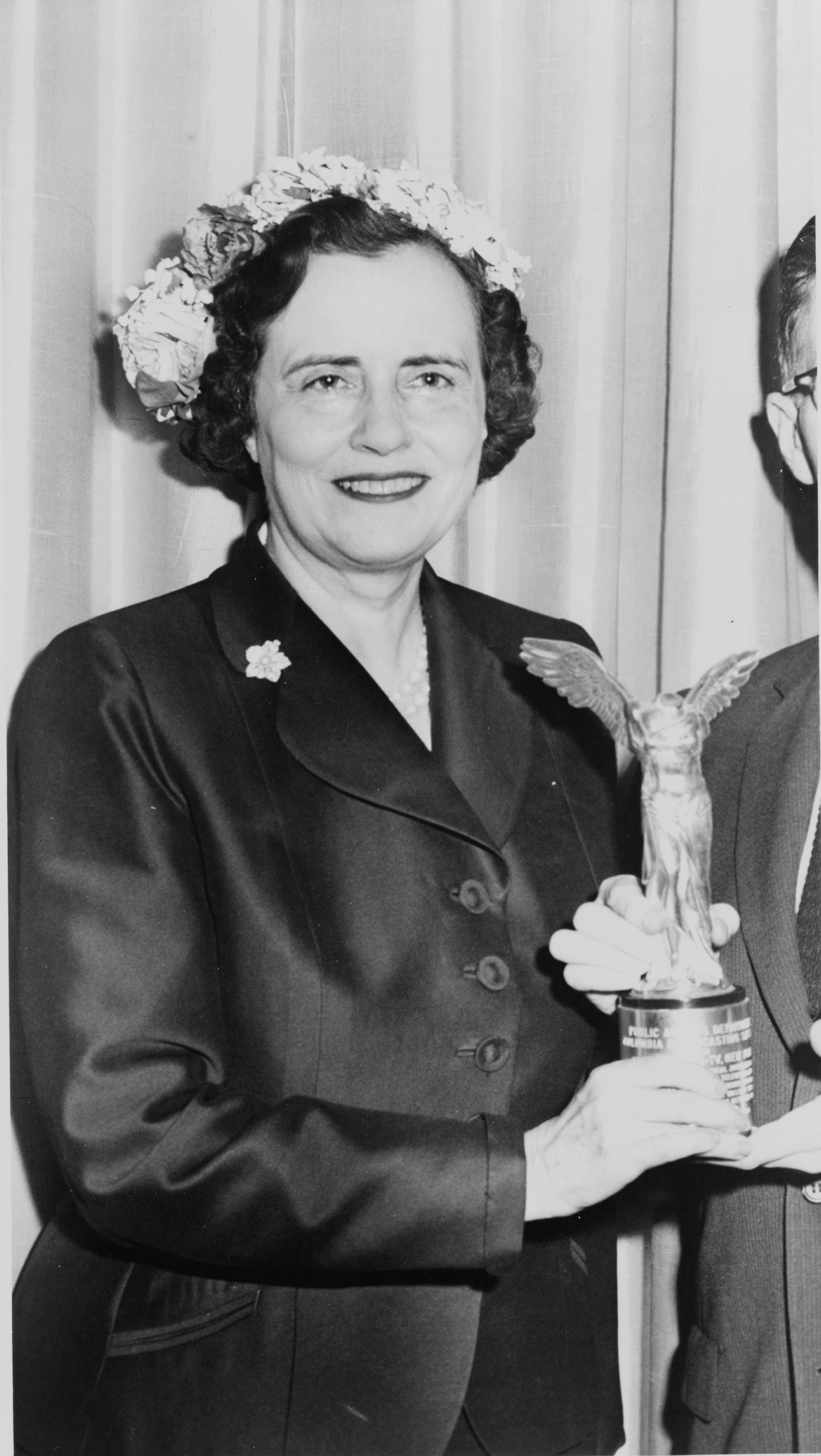
Mary Lasker helped Sen. Claude Pepper present the case to the government for a national institute for cancer, for heart disease, and for neurological disorders. She collected data and found experts.

The National Institute of Neurological Disorders and Blindness (NINDB), the original name for the NINDS, was officially established on November 22, 1950, three months after President Harry Truman signed the Omnibus Medical Research Act (Public Law 81-692) on August 15, 1950. The legislation had been passed with the efforts of Senator Claude Pepper, who was responsible for helping the majority of the NIH institutes get their start, wealthy New York entrepreneur Mary Lasker, and Fight for Sight founder Mildred Weisenfeld, who had retinitis pigmentosa.

NINDB was not conceived of entirely coherently at the beginning. For example, blindness was added because some concerned citizens raised the issue with Lasker who, in turn asked Congressman Andrew Biemiller to do so in Congress. He simply added it to the bill, being sympathetic with the cause since his mother was blind.

NINDB was "responsible for conducting and supporting research and training in the 200 neurological and sensory disorders that affected 20 million individuals in the United States and were 'the first cause of permanent crippling and the third cause of death.'" Because the etiology of the most common neurological diseases was poorly understood, NINDB undertook both clinical and basic research on the disorders themselves and on treatments; intramural research on the structure of the brain and the nervous system itself; and, finally, extramural research on the entire field of neurology and blindness.

In the beginning, the NINDB had an Advisory Council made of six medical professional and lay people, all appointed by the U. S. Surgeon General. They formulated the path taken by the institute and granted its funds. The NINDB's first annual budget was US$1.23 million. This came from the existing NIH budget, as Congress had not appropriated any new funds for the institute when it was created. Although the NINDB's budget was increased to $1.99 million in 1952, there was still no money for new research programs. Moreover, the institute had neither a clinic nor a lab. As Ingrid Farreras writes in her history, "The research conducted by the institute was still supported by the NIMH [National Institute of Mental Health] and the institute's survival was unclear."

The NINDB's first director, Pearce Bailey, was appointed on October 3, 1951, and came with experience from the Neuropsychiatry Division at Philadelphia Naval Hospital. He appointed a representative from the AAN to meet with citizens' groups and they met together to generate a unified set of demands. As a result, the National Committee for Research in Neurological Disorders (NCRND) was formed. The NCRND presented a coherent research proposal to Congress and in 1953 the NINDB received a separate line item budget of $4.5 million. The institute was now able to fund its research. However, until 1961, the NINDB and NIMH shared research facilities and scientists, often collaborating on projects.

=== 1951–1968: Strong political alliances and adding stroke ===
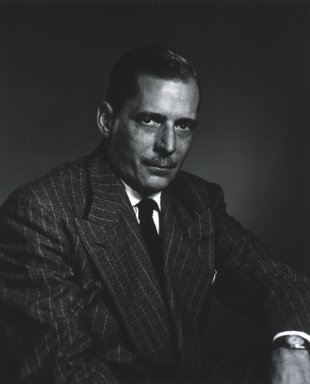
Pearce Bailey, the first director of NINDB, was the son of Pearce Bailey, one of the founders of the New York Neurological Institute.

Bailey established the extramural grants and field investigations into retrolental fibroplasia, geographic distribution of multiple sclerosis, and projects related to mental retardation and cerebral palsy. In 1955, then U.S. Senator John F. Kennedy announced, to the organization United Cerebral Palsy, that the institute was "planning to launch an all-out attack against the dread spectre of cerebral palsy". By 1959, a study to look at how gestation affected cerebral palsy had been started.

During the 1950s, Mary Lasker, Senator Lister Hill and Representative John E. Fogarty ensured continued financial support for NINDB. Together, the two Congressmen held hearings to establish the NIH budget and lobbied hard for more funds. They were assisted by Lasker, who had extensive Washington connections and was aided by Mike Gorman, a journalist and promoter of mental health. The new director of the NIH, James Shannon, a politically astute man who also had an ability to pick talented scientists, helped solidify what became "the golden years of science at NIH". With Shannon, Fogarty, Hill, and Lasker working together, the NIH's budget as a whole increased more than tenfold between 1955 and 1965. This directly benefited NINDB, as its budget rose and fell along with general budget.

Throughout the 1960s, under the directorship of Richard L. Masland, the NINDB sponsored the ground-breaking research of Carleton Gajdusek and Joseph Gibbs. Gajdusek eventually won a Nobel Prize for his work on kuru in New Guinea. The NINDB also set up clinical research centers at several universities as well as targeted research programs, such as the head injury program and the epilepsy initiative.

Stroke was added to the institute's mandate in the 1960s and in October 1968 the institute became the "National Institute of Neurological Diseases and Stroke". Lasker was prompted to address the disease when Joseph P. Kennedy, father of then-President John F. Kennedy had one. She convinced him that a stroke commission would be a good idea and they agreed that Michael E. DeBakey would be a good director. After Kennedy was assassinated, she approached President Lyndon Johnson, who established the President's Commission on Heart Disease, Cancer and Stroke in 1964 with DeBakey at its head. The commission produced a report that resulted in a bill being passed in 1965 that established centers for the diseases across the country. In his history of the NINDS, Rowland explains that "authorities later doubted that they had much lasting impact on stroke theory or therapy." This example, he notes, "illustrates the tension between advocates of basic research and those who wanted immediate application". Johnson and Lasker wanted to see people benefit right away while the director of the NIH, Shannon, and other scientists were more cautious about using knowledge they did not fully understand and skeptical of the "disease-of-the-month approach". They had a "bedrock belief in the importance of basic science".

The political alliance that between Shannon, Lasker, Fogarty, and Hill began to splinter at the end of the 1960s. In 1967 when he wrote a 20-year history of the NIH, Shannon did not mention Lasker's contributions. By 1968, Fogarty had died and Hill and Johnson had declined to run for reelection. With the election of Richard Nixon, the tone of research funding changed.

In general, according to Rowland, "there was a feeling that vision research was not being adequately at NINDB". In 1967, a bill to create a separate eye institute was drafted, and in August 1968, federal legislation created the National Eye Institute, to build an enlarged program based on the blindness research that had been conducted by NINDB.

=== 1968–1980 ===
Starting in the late 1960s, the budget of the NIH as a whole was reduced, which affected NINDS. Training programs were cut. President Richard Nixon's administration directed the institutes to work more aggressively on applied research and projects that would directly affect patients. Natalie Spingarn argues in her book about the politics of health research that the Nixon administration resisted scientists who did were not politically sympathetic to the president. Shannon has described the years between 1967 and 1970 as a time of "progressive constraints": the budgetary process was "chaotic", with "Presidential vetoes, overrides by Congress, proposed recission of funds allocated, acceptance or rejection of these recissions by Congress, impoundment of appropriations, and their later release by court action". In general, increases in the NIH budget during the 1970s and 1980s often did not exceed inflation. Edward F. MacNichol, who was director of NINDS between 1968 and 1973 described his tenure as the end of a "long period of NIH prosperity". Rowland writes that "these years of financial insecurity may have been the most difficult time in the history of NINDS". However, he notes the achievements they made as well. For example, King Engel and his team discovered that prednisone could effectively treat myasthenia gravis and acetazolamide was shown to prevent periodic paralysis.

In March 1975 the institute was again renamed, becoming the National Institute of Neurological and Communicative Disorders and Stroke (NINCDS).

=== 1980s ===
In November 1988, some of NINCDS's research was moved to the newly created National Institute on Deafness and Other Communication Disorders, and NINCDS was renamed the National Institute of Neurological Disorders and Stroke, its current name.

=== 1990s ===
During the 1990s, Senators Arlen Specter and Tom Harkin were responsible for pushing a large increase in the NIH budget as a whole. They doubled it in five years and subsequent years saw annual increases of 15 percent.

=== 2000s ===
The NINDS budget passed $1 billion for the first time in fiscal 2000; the bulk of the budget is dedicated to extramural research and investigator-initiated grants (intramural research accounts for about 10 percent of the total).

=== 2020s ===
In April 2025, under the second presidency of Donald Trump, the NINDS Biorepository, along with at least 33 other online archives run by the NIH, placed a disclaimer on their site that read, "This repository is under review for potential modification in compliance with Administration directives" as a result of Executive Order 14168.

In December 2025, the NIH decided not to renew the contract of Walter Koroshetz, director of NINDS since 2015, despite a recommendation by an NIH review panel and an endorsement by NIH director Jay Bhattacharya. As a result, 40 neuroscience organizations, led by the American Academy of Neurology, sent a letter to members of Congress expressing "significant concern" and urging Congress to exercise closer oversight over leadership changes.

== Mission ==
The mission of the NINDS, as stated on their website, is "to reduce the burden of neurological disease—a burden borne by every age group, every segment of society, and people all over the world". The NINDS notes that there are over 600 such disorders, with some of the common being stroke, epilepsy, Parkinson's disease, and autism. In an effort to achieve their goal, the NINDS "supports and conducts research, both basic and clinical, on the normal and diseased nervous system, fosters the training of investigators in the basic and clinical neurosciences, and seeks better understanding, diagnosis, treatment, and prevention of neurological disorders."

== Research ==
=== General ===
"Some important areas of NINDS basic research include: biology of the cells of the nervous system, brain and nervous system development, genetics of the brain, cognition and behavior, neurodegeneration, brain plasticity and repair, neural signaling, learning and memory, motor control and integration, sensory function, and neural channels, synapses, and circuits."

"Some key areas of NINDS clinical research include: neurological consequences of AIDS, Alzheimer disease, brain tumors, developmental disorders, epilepsy, motor neuron diseases, muscular dystrophies, multiple sclerosis, neurogenetic disorders, pain, Parkinson disease and other neurodegenerative disorders, sleep disorders, spinal cord injury, stroke, and traumatic brain injury."

"Most NINDS-funded research is conducted by extramural scientists in public and private institutions, such as universities, medical schools, and hospitals. NINDS intramural scientists, working in the Institute's laboratories, branches, and clinics, also conduct research in most of the major areas of neuroscience and on many of the most important and challenging neurological disorders. The Institute's interests, however, are not limited to NINDS programs. The Institute collaborates with other NIH components, as well as with other federal agencies, and with voluntary, professional and commercial organizations."

=== Specific ===
==== Javits Neuroscience Investigator Award ====
The Javits Neuroscience Investigator Award (R37) was established in October 1983 to honor the late U. S. Senator Jacob K. Javits, "a strong advocate for support of research in a wide variety of disorders of the brain and nervous system" who had amyotrophic lateral sclerosis (ALS).

Douglas G. Stuart was an early awardee among the over 600 of these up-to-seven-year awards granted from 1984 to date

==== Landis Award for Outstanding Mentorship ====
The Landis Award for Outstanding Mentorship is named after former NINDS Director Dr. Story Landis.

== Structure ==
=== Director ===
Amy Bany Adams is serving as the acting director of NINDS.

=== Division of Extramural Research ===
The Division of Extramural Research funds programs outside of the NIH which "support research, research training, and career development". The Division itself is broken down into "program clusters" that are "organized around critical, cross-cutting scientific topics that hold great promise for advancing knowledge and reducing the burden of neurological disease". They are: Repair and Plasticity; Systems and Cognitive Neuroscience; Channels, Synapses, and Circuits; Neurogenetics; Neural Environment; and Neurodegeneration. Other working groups include: the Clinical Trials group, the Office of Minority Health and Research, the Technology Development group; and the Office of International Activities, and the Office of Training and Career Development. Within these areas, the Division tracks research and development and determines the necessity and areas for further research, analyzing and reporting on its findings to the NIH and the nation. It pursues research with other NIH institutes. Finally, it consults with and outside scientists, health organizations, and medical associational to help identify research needs and develops necessary programs to meet them.

=== Division of Intramural Research ===
The Division of Intramural Research is "one of the largest neuroscience research centers in the world". Scientists here do research in the "basic, translational, and clinical neurosciences", covering a wide range of topics, including "molecular biophysics, synapses and circuits, neuronal development, integrative neuroscience, brain imaging and neurological disorders".

== List of directors ==
Past directors from 1951 - present

No.	Portrait	Director	Took office	Left office	Refs.
1		Pearce Bailey Jr.	1951	1959	
2		Richard L. Masland	1959	1968	
3		Edward F. MacNichol, Jr.	September 1, 1968	1973	
acting		Donald B. Tower	May 1, 1973	May 31, 1974	
4		Donald B. Tower	May 31, 1974	February 1, 1981	
5		Murray Goldstein	December 23, 1982	December 1993	
acting		Patricia A. Grady	December 1993	August 31, 1994	
6		Zach W. Hall	September 1, 1994	December 31, 1997	
acting		Audrey S. Penn	January 1, 1998	July 31, 1998	
7		Gerald Fischbach	August 1, 1998	January 31, 2001	
acting		Audrey S. Penn	February 1, 2001	August 31, 2003	
8		Story Landis	September 1, 2003	September 30, 2014	
acting		Walter J. Koroshetz	October 1, 2014	July 28, 2015	
9		Walter J. Koroshetz	July 29, 2015	January 24, 2026	
acting		Amy Bany Adams	October 1, 2014	Present	
