= Alfred Nisonoff =

American immunology researcher (1923–2001)

- Born: January 26, 1923; Corona, Queens
- Died: March 12, 2001 (aged 78)
- Education: Rutgers University, Johns Hopkins University
- Spouse: Sarah Weismann
- Scientific career
- Fields: Chemistry, Immunology
- Workplaces: U.S. Rubber Company U.S. Navy National Institutes of Health

Alfred Nisonoff (1923–2001) was a 20th-century American chemist who helped to experimentally determine the molecular structure of the antibody, and, as a result, made major contributions to the field of immunology. Nisonoff's monograph, “The Antibody Molecule,” was the most important and in-depth paper on the antibody during his time.

== Biography ==
Nisonoff's parents immigrated from Hungary and Russia to New York City as teenagers. He was born into a Jewish family in Corona, Queens on January 26, 1923. His parents moved the family to South River, New Jersey, where they operated a butcher shop and a grocery store throughout Alfred's childhood.

== Education ==
As a child, Nisonoff was an extremely well educated person. At the age of 6 he was in the third grade, and went on to graduate from high school at the age of 15. After graduation, he received a state scholarship to attend college and enrolled in Rutgers University, within less than 50 miles of his home. Nisonoff's interest in chemistry began when he was introduced to a home laboratory of a high-school friend. From this experience, Nisonoff made the decision to major in chemistry at Rutgers.

In 1942, at age 19, Nisonoff graduated from Rutgers with a chemistry degree, and went to work for the U.S. Rubber company in Detroit, Michigan. He was assigned to determine a way to adhere nylon cords to rubber airline tires in order to add strength to the tires, previously manufactured using cotton cords. In passing through the factory, he stopped to watch a process in which nylon cords were used in strengthening self-sealing gas tanks made of rubber, and adapted this same process to the problem that faced him in strengthening the airplane tires. This type of analytical and creative thinking would prove to be useful in his future research on the structure of the antibody.

In Detroit, Nisonoff met Sarah Weismann, his future wife. In 1943, Nisonoff joined the U.S. Navy to help in the war effort. He missed the battle of Okinawa by only a month due to engine problems with his ship. 2 He served until the end of the war in 1945, and was finally discharged in July, 1946. He then took the opportunity to pursue graduate research in biochemistry in September 1946, with Frederick W. Barnes at Johns Hopkins University through funds provided by the G.I. Bill. He received his M.A. in 1948 and his Ph.D. in 1951. His research with Barnes was on the enzymatic mechanism of transamination.

== Research work ==
Nisonoff was introduced to the subject of antibodies while studying at Roswell Park Comprehensive Cancer Center (then known as Roswell Park Memorial Institute) in Buffalo, New York, with a man named David Pressman. David Pressman was working in one of Linus Pauling’s groups exploring the antigenic specificity of antibodies against haptenic determinants. This research took advantage of the technique of quantitative hapten inhibition, originally developed by Karl Landsteiner. While conducting these experiments in Pressman’s lab, Nisonoff contributed to an important paper explaining an idea that eventually led to important conclusions about the structure of the antibody molecule. In this early paper he demonstrated that the antibody molecule has two combining sites with the same specificity for an antigenic determinant. This helped to disprove the “instructional theories” of antibody formation.

Nisonoff's most important work started when he began the enzymatic cleavage of rabbit antibodies to better determine the structure that contributed to their specificity in disease. He was continuing the work of Rodney Porter who had performed the enzymatic cleavage of antibodies with the enzyme papain. When Nisonoff used a different enzyme, pepsin, to digest the antibodies, he discovered that the enzymes cleave the proteins at different sites on opposite sides of the disulfide bridge connecting the two heavy chains of rabbit IgG. This led to the conclusion that papain cleaves on the amino-terminal side of the disulfide bond, and pepsin cleaves on the carboxyl-terminal side. Nisonoff's work also contributed to the identification of the F(ab’)2 fragment of the antibody molecule, which is the single bivalent fragment that is produced after pepsin cleavage. Later, it was found that this fragment is responsible for antigen interaction and agglutination and precipitation reactions.

Nisonoff's experiment led to many conclusions about the structure of the antibody. It was determined that the two antigen binding sites of the antibody are located opposite the Fc fragment, the part of the antibody responsible for binding to receptor cells. Through the further work of his colleagues, with the help of Nisonoff's previous work, the full structure of the antibody molecule as well as its amino acid composition were determined.

Nisonoff's work continued to concentrate on efforts to determine how the structure of the antibody reflects its function and specificity as an immunological tool. In 1975, Nisonoff, John Hopper, and Susan Spring published the monograph "The Antibody Molecule". This piece reviewed the comprehensive information available at the time on the structure and function of the B-cell receptor.

Nisonoff focused the remainder of his career in a variety of positions within the immunology community, including work for the Department of Biological Chemistry in Chicago and the National Institutes of Health (NIH). Nisonoff's research work in determining the structure and functions of small proteins called antibodies made major steps towards our modern understanding of the immune system. Without his work we may still be years behind our current understanding of the antibody molecule. Nisonoff died on March 12, 2001.
