= Audrey S. Penn =

American neurologist

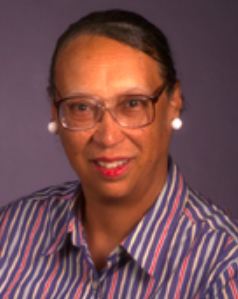
- Born: 1934 (age 91–92); New York City
- Education: Swarthmore College; Columbia University
- Known for: Deputy Director, National Institute of Neurological Disorders and Stroke (NIH); President, American Neurological Association (1994); First African-American woman to serve as (acting) director of an NIH institute
- Scientific career
- Fields: Neurology
- Workplaces: Columbia-Presbyterian Medical Center; University of Pennsylvania; Columbia University; National Institute of Neurological Disorders and Stroke (NIH)

Audrey Shields Penn (born in 1934) is an American neurologist and emeritus professor. Her major area of research was in the biochemistry of muscle weakness in myasthenia gravis. Penn was elected President of the American Neurological Association in 1994. She was deputy director of the National Institute of Neurological Disorders and Stroke (NINDS), and is the first African-American woman to serve as an (acting) director of an Institute of the National Institutes of Health (NIH).

== Early life and education ==
Audrey Penn was born in New York City, New York in 1934. She gained a scholarship to Swarthmore College in Pennsylvania, graduating in 1956 with a major in chemistry. The graduation yearbook notes she played violin, hockey, basketball, and softball. Penn decided to study medicine, because she wanted to have more contact with people in her work.

Penn gained her medical degree from Columbia University in New York in 1960, interning at the Bronx Municipal Hospital Center, and undertaking speciality training in neurology at Columbia University. She chose neurology, she said, "because there was so much wonderful information to learn about the brain and everything connected to it."

== Career ==
First at the University of Pennsylvania, Penn pursued postdoctoral study and research into the biochemistry of muscles in muscle diseases, especially the autoimmune disease, myasthenia gravis, and drugs for autoimmune diseases. In 1970, she became the first African-American member of the Swarthmore College board. In 1972, she was promoted to associate professor of neurology at the University of Pennsylvania.

In 1982, Penn was appointed professor of neurology, in the College of Physicians and Surgeons at Columbia University. She practiced as a neurologist at Columbia-Presbyterian Medical Center, and gained a training fellowship from the National Institute of Neurological Disorders and Stroke (NINDS) at the NIH.

In 1989, Penn was elected second vice president of the American Neurological Association, then first vice president in 1990, and president for 1994.

Penn was a member of the council of the NINDS. In 1995, she was recruited to the position of deputy director of the institute, which oversees a program of in-house research and training, as well as grants for external research. She described her role: "My job goes all the way from making policy regarding finding the causes of neurological disorders, to training new neurologists and scientists, to dealing with patients and the general public," she says. "We try to look down the road and make predictions about what will work in solving the problems of people with neurological disorders."

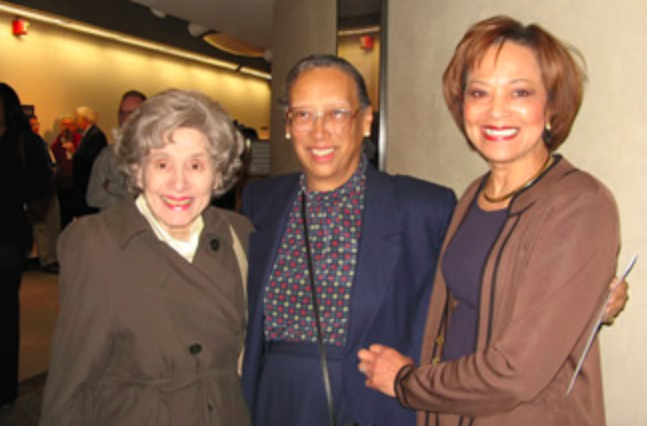
Ruth Kirschstein (left), Audrey Penn (center), and Yvonne Maddox, at NINDS symposium to honor Dr Penn, 2007

Penn also became the first African-American woman to serve as a director of an institute of the NIH, acting in that capacity for NINDS from January to July in 1998, and then from February 2001 to August 2003.

After 10 years, in 2007, Penn retired from her position as deputy director, and moved to the institute's Office of Minority Health and Research, with the role of senior advisor to the institute's director. A symposium on myasthenia gravis was held in her honor at NINDS.

In several of the positions she held, Penn was the first African-American and/or the first woman. She was a member of several professional organizations, and served as chair of the review panel for medical student fellowships at the Howard Hughes Medical Institute (HHMI).

Penn's lasting impact on the field of neurology prompted The American Neurological Association (ANA) to name an award after her: The Audrey S. Penn Lectureship Award. A member of the ANA who advances research or education efforts that advocate for health equity is considered a good candidate for this level of recognition.

== Photos ==
- Yearbook photo, 1956 (Swarthmore, page 83).
- Yearbook photos, 1960 (Columbia, medical school, pages 23 and 81).
- Laboratory photo.
