= Arthur M. Silverstein =

American immunologist and science historian

Arthur M. Silverstein is an American immunologist and science historian who has written extensively on the history of immunology. He is Professor Emeritus of Ophthalmic Immunology at the Johns Hopkins School of Medicine, where he spent 25 years on the faculty in the Department of Ophthalmology and was also affiliated with its Institute of the History of Medicine.

Silverstein took a break during his Ph.D. studies at Ohio State University and worked as a technician in the laboratory of David Pressman, where he first became interested in the subject of immunology. He returned to his studies and received a Ph.D. in physical chemistry from Rensselaer Polytechnic Institute in 1954. After finishing, Silverstein entered military service and was assigned to the Armed Forces Institute of Pathology, where he found a mentor in then-Scientific Director Ernest Goodpasture and studied the development of the immune system. Silverstein ultimately spent around 10 years at the institute before joining the faculty at Johns Hopkins. Silverstein served as the president of the Association for Research in Vision and Ophthalmology in 1987-88 and received the organization's Special Recognition Award in 2000 for his administration of the organization's Fight for Sight grants program.

== Publications ==
Silverstein has authored several books and articles on the history of science, including A History of Immunology and Paul Ehrlich's Receptor Immunology.
