= Fight for Sight (UK) =

UK charity

Fight for Sight is a UK charity funding research into the prevention and treatment of blindness and eye disease.

Since 1965 the charity has been funding medical research into a wide range of eye conditions, including macular degeneration, glaucoma, cataract, corneal eye disease, trachoma, diabetic retinopathy as well as a wide range of inherited eye diseases and the causes of childhood blindness.

The charity funds researchers based at universities and hospitals throughout the UK and those undertaking research in the UK and overseas.

Fight for Sight in the UK is unaffiliated with the organization also named Fight for Sight (U.S.) in the United States.

== History ==
Fight for Sight was founded in 1965 by Professor Norman Ashton CBE, Director of Pathology at the UCL Institute of Ophthalmology. In the same year, the Prevention of Blindness Research Fund (which later became the British Eye Research Foundation) was established with funds raised by the Royal Eye Hospital League of Friends.

Fight for Sight as it exists today evolved through a merger of Fight for Sight and the British Eye Research Foundation in 2005. This merger created the largest national charity dedicated to funding eye research in the UK.

== Organisation ==
The charity's headquarters are in London, England.

== Governance ==
Fight for Sight is governed by a board of Trustees who meet at least four times a year to agree the strategy and areas of activity for the charity. There are 12 Trustees on the board.
