= Yvonne Maddox =

American academic

Yvonne T. Maddox
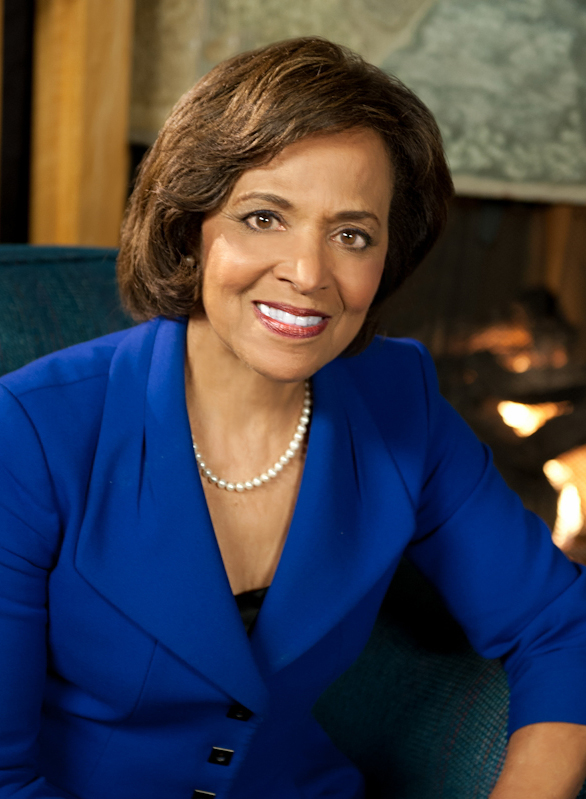
- Education: Georgetown University; American University; Virginia Union University
- Scientific career
- Workplaces: National Institute on Minority Health and Health Disparities; Eunice Kennedy Shriver National Institute of Child Health and Human Development; National Institutes of Health

Yvonne T. Maddox is an American academic who is president and CEO of the T.A. Thornton Foundation. She previously served as vice president for research at the Uniformed Services University. Prior to joining USUHS, she was the acting director of the National Institute on Minority Health and Health Disparities at the National Institutes of Health (NIH). Her career at the NIH also includes leadership roles as acting deputy director of the agency and deputy director of the Eunice Kennedy Shriver National Institute of Child Health and Human Development.

== Education ==
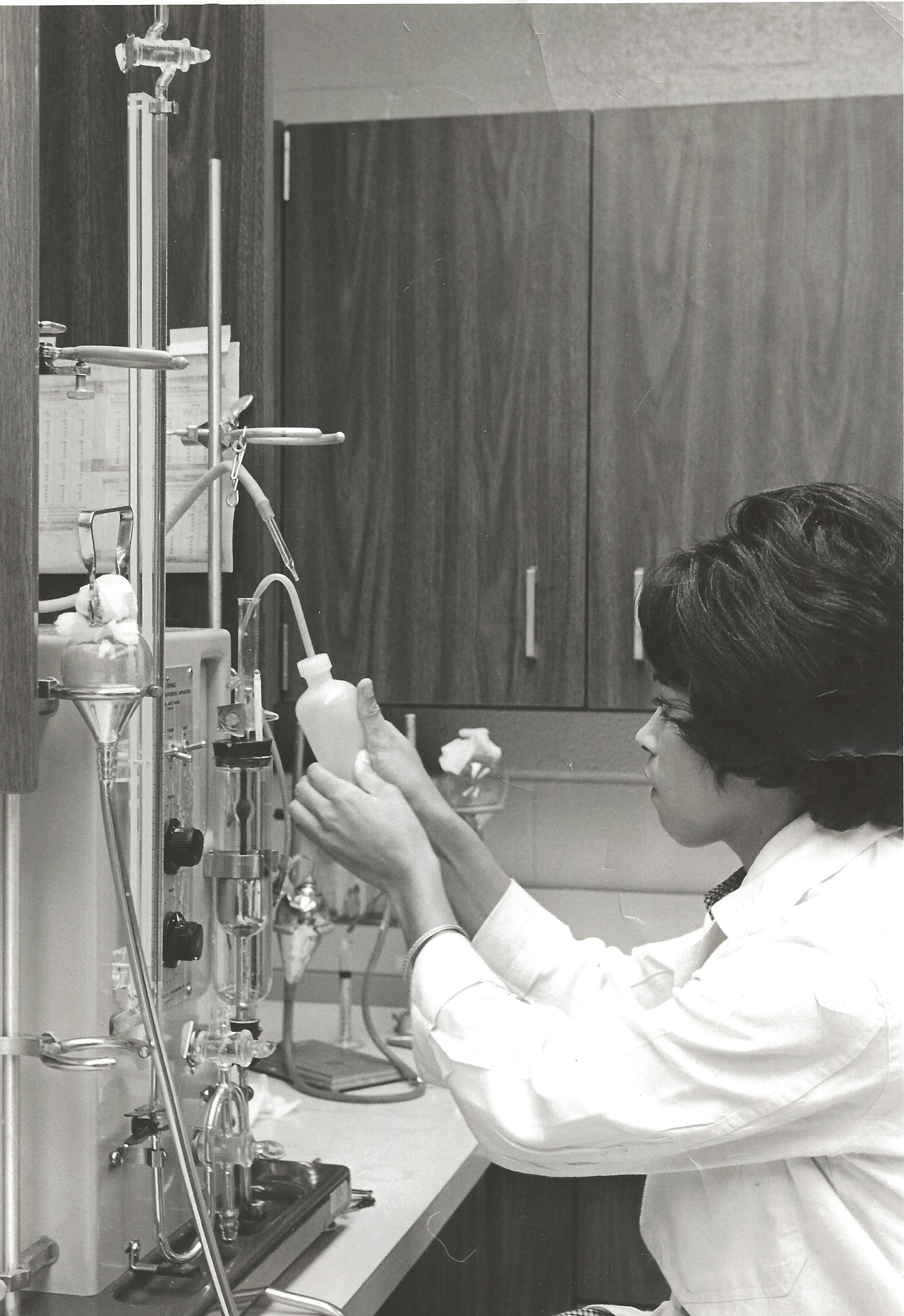
Yvonne T. Maddox conducts research early in her career.

Maddox received her Bachelor of Science degree in biology from Virginia Union University in 1965.

During her senior year, Maddox was accepted into medical school; her father's illness caused her to give up medical school aspirations and take a position as a technician at the Medical College of Virginia in order to provide for her parents and two brothers. Later, after marrying and becoming a mother, Maddox enrolled in graduate school, and in 1981 she received her Ph.D. in physiology from Georgetown University.

Maddox was a National Research Service Award Postdoctoral Fellow and an assistant professor of physiology in the Department of Physiology and Biophysics at Georgetown. She also studied as a visiting scientist at the French Atomic Energy Commission in Saclay, France, and graduated from the Senior Managers in Government Program of the John F. Kennedy School of Government, Harvard University.

== Career ==
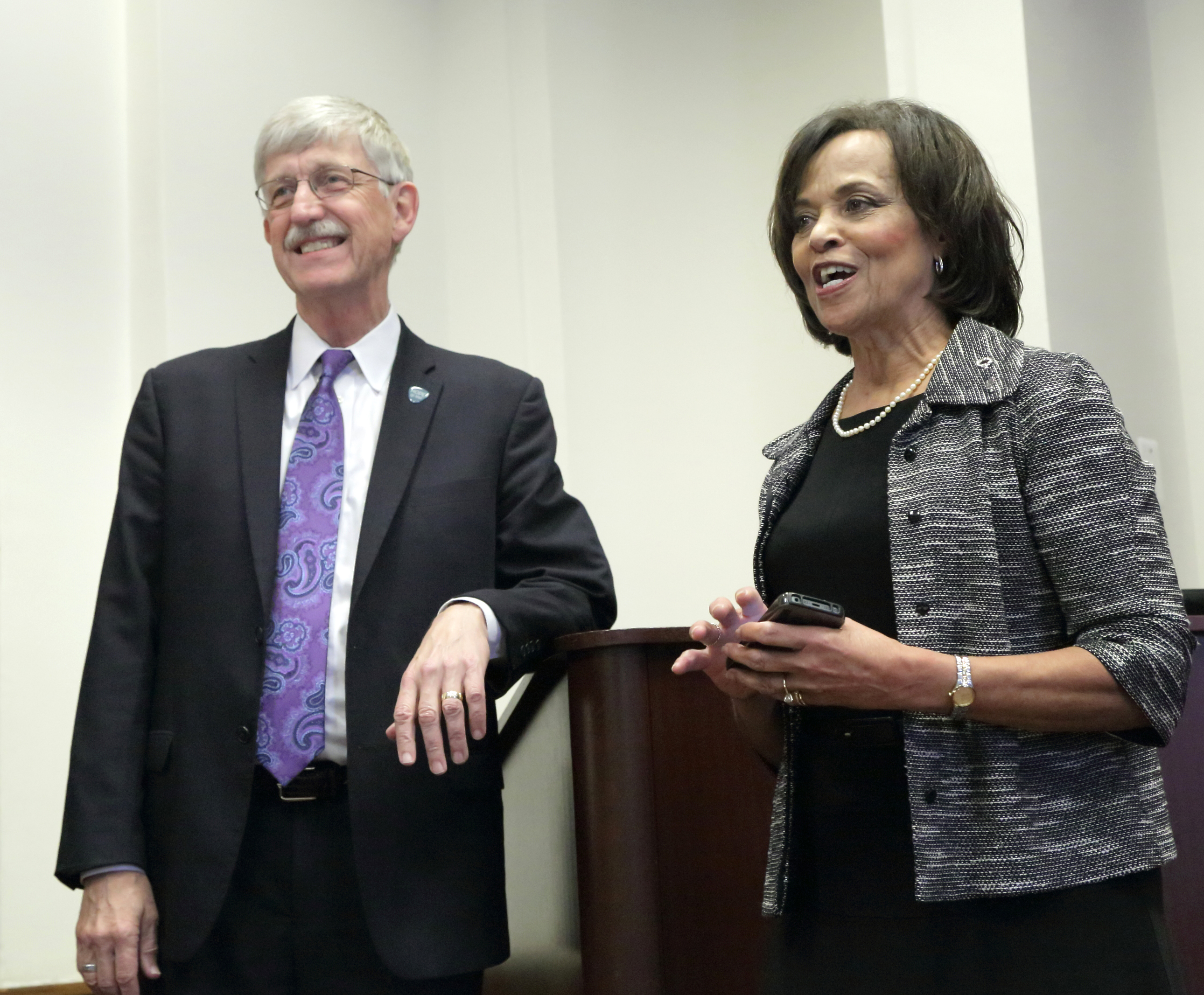
NIH director Francis Collins and NIMHD acting director Yvonne T. Maddox at NIMHD's first scientific operational planning meeting.

Maddox's career has focused on healthcare equity for minorities, women, and children, in both the United States and abroad. She first started working in 1965 as a blood bank technician in the Department of Medicine at the Medical College of Virginia. From 1968 to 1985, she worked as a researcher, instructor, and visiting scientist in various institutions including the Department of Inhalation Toxicology, the Department of Ophthalmology at the Washington Hospital Center, the Department of Biology at American University, the Department of Physiology and Biophysics at Georgetown University Medical Center, the French Atomic Energy Commission, and the Department of Physiology and Biophysics at Georgetown.

In 1985, Maddox began work as a health scientist administrator at the National Institute of General Medical Sciences, where she became deputy director of the Biophysics and Physiological Sciences Program and chief of the Pharmacology and Physiological Sciences Section, and acting director of the Minority Access to Research Careers Program from 1993 to 1994.

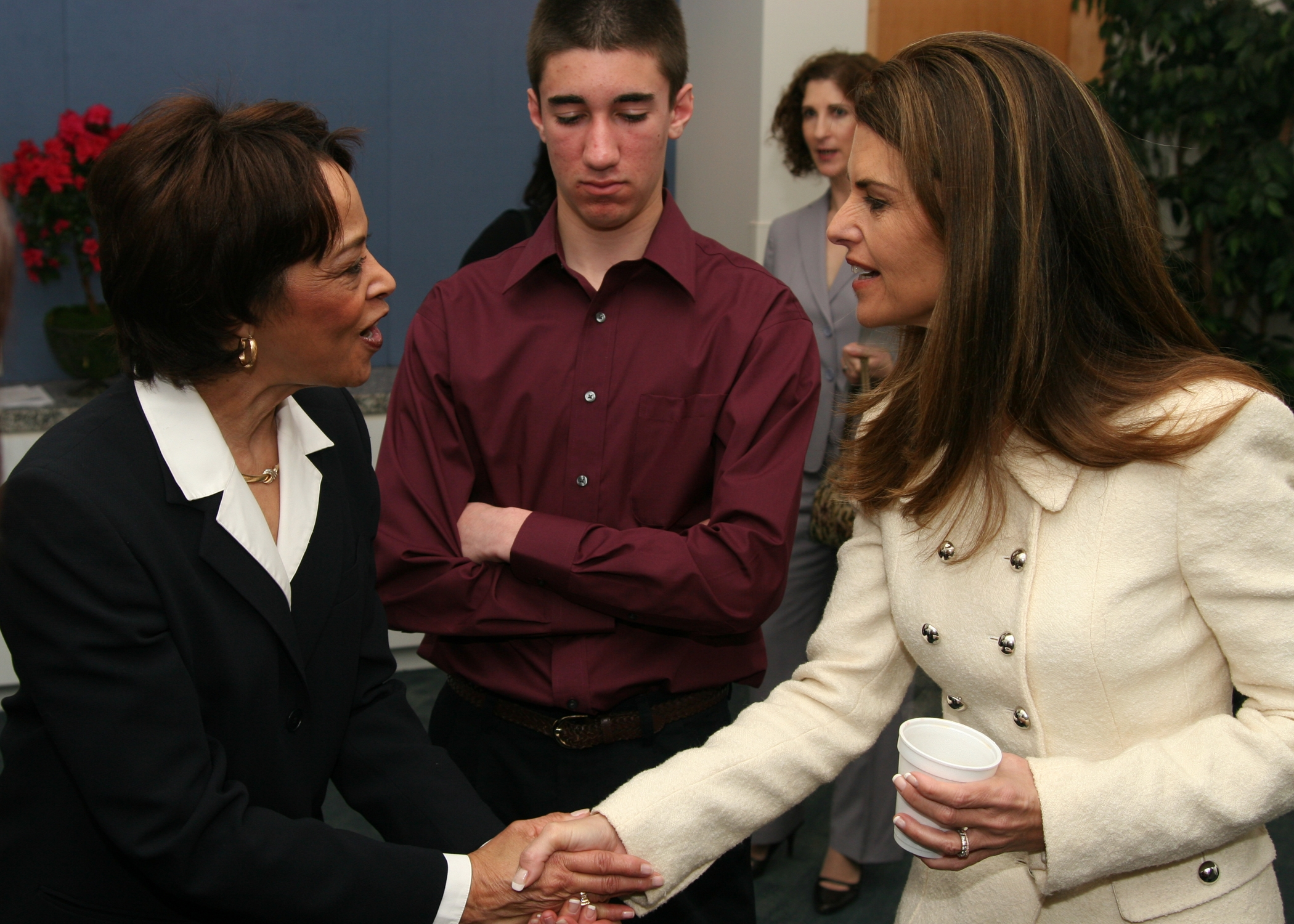
Maddox meets Maria Shriver

From 1995 to 2014, Maddox was the deputy director of the Eunice Kennedy Shriver National Institute of Child Health and Human Development (NICHD). As deputy director, she led many federal and international efforts to improve maternal and child health, including the NICHD Safe to Sleep (formerly the Back to Sleep campaign), the NIH Down Syndrome Consortium, and the Global Network for Women's and Children's Health Research.

While deputy director of NICHD, she was also acting director of the National Center for Medical Rehabilitation Research and the institute's acting associate director for Prevention and International Activities. Maddox was the NIH acting deputy director from January 2000 to June 2002. In 2014, Maddox became the acting director of the National Institute on Minority Health and Health Disparities.

In June 2015, Dr. Maddox became the Vice President for Research at the Uniformed Services University of the Health Sciences.

== Awards and honors ==
- United States Presidential Distinguished Executive Rank Award
- United States Presidential Meritorious Executive Rank Award
- Public Health Service Special Recognition Award
- United States Department of Health & Human Services Secretary's Award
- United States Department of Health & Human Services Career Achievement Award
- National Institutes of Health Director's Award
- American Academy of Physical Medicine and Rehabilitation Distinguished Public Service Award
- HeLa Award from the Morehouse School of Medicine
- 2014 National Caucus on Arthritis and Musculoskeletal Health Disparities’ Vanguard Award for Scientific Leadership in Health Disparities

Maddox was inducted into the Historically Black Colleges and Universities Hall of Fame in recognition for her contributions in the field of medicine. She has also received several honorary degrees, served on public service and academic boards, and delivered national and international keynote scientific lectures.
