= Story Landis =

American neurobiologist

Story C. Landis
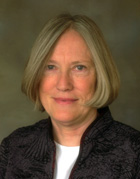
- Education: Wellesley College, Harvard University
- Scientific career
- Workplaces: Harvard Medical School; Case Western Reserve University School of Medicine; National Institutes of Health

Story C. Landis is an American neurobiologist and former director of the National Institute of Neurological Disorders and Stroke at the National Institutes of Health. She was director of the institute between September 1, 2003 and October 2014. Dr. Landis worked at NINDS since 1995, and was named Chair of the NIH Stem Cell Task Force in 2007.

== Life ==
She received her undergraduate degree in biology from Wellesley College in 1967 and her master's degree and Ph.D. from Harvard University. Her doctoral work at Harvard focused on cerebellar development in mice. She was a postdoctoral fellow at Harvard, where she studied transmitter plasticity in sympathetic neurons.

Dr. Landis served as a professor in the Department of Neurobiology at Harvard Medical School until 1985, when she joined the faculty of Case Western Reserve University School of Medicine.

She is an elected fellow of the American Academy of Arts and Sciences, the American Association for the Advancement of Science, and the American Neurological Association.
