= David Pressman (scientist) =

American immunologist

David Pressman was an American immunologist. He graduated from the California Institute of Technology in 1937 and received his PhD from the same institution in 1940. He remained at Caltech as a research fellow until 1947. During that time, he worked with Linus Pauling and Dan H. Campbell and the three published highly influential work on antibodies and antigens. Pressman then joined the faculty at the Sloan-Kettering Institute. He later moved to Roswell Park Comprehensive Cancer Center.

Among the influential members of his research group were Herman Eisen, Arthur Silverstein, and Alfred Nisonoff.
