= Eliseo J. Pérez-Stable =

Cuban-American physician-scientist

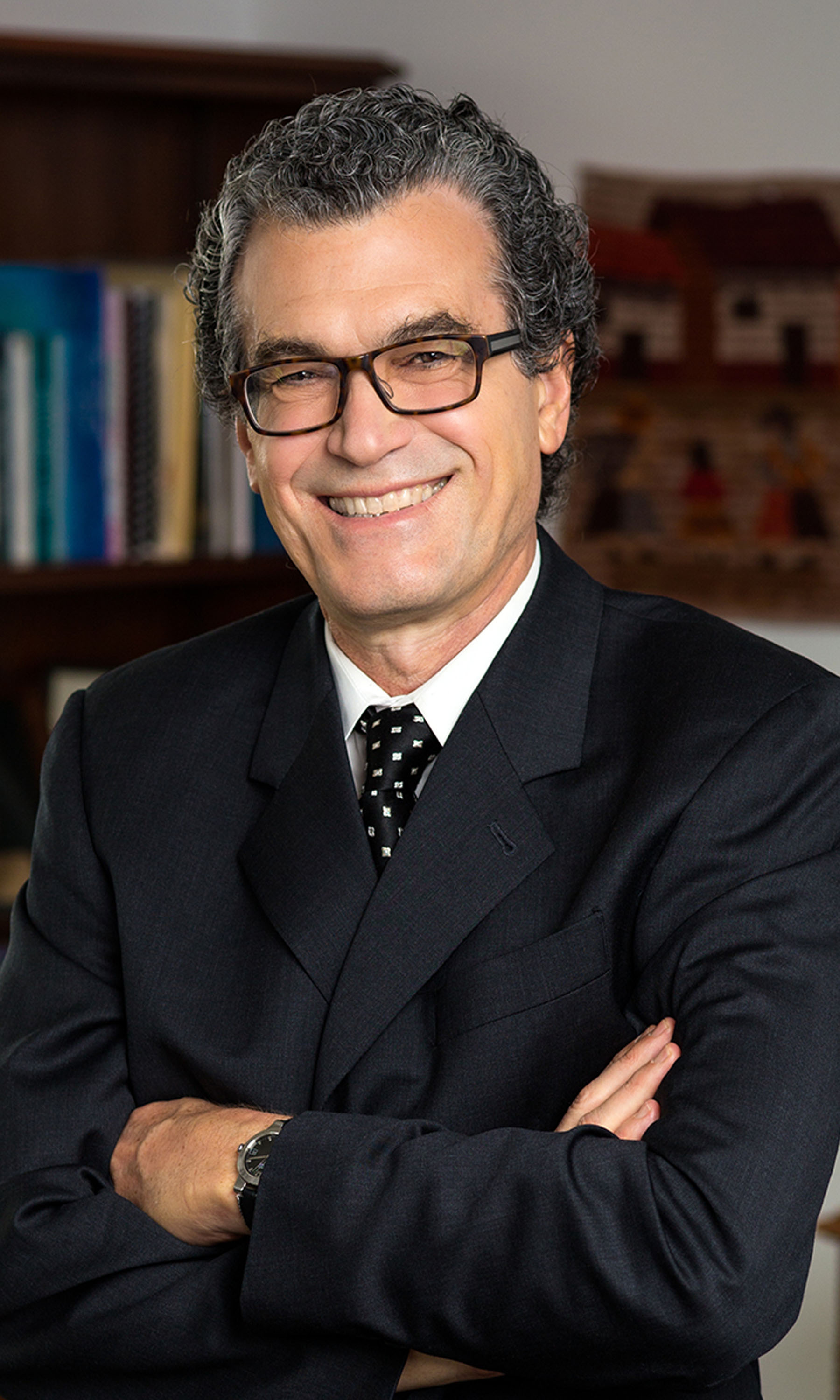

Director of the National Institute on Minority Health and Health Disparities
- Incumbent
- Assumed office September 2015
- Preceded by: John Ruffin

Personal details
- Born: Cuba
- Education: University of Miami (BA, MD)
- Scientific career
- Fields: Health equity
- Workplaces: UCSF School of Medicine

Eliseo J. Pérez-Stable is a Cuban-American physician-scientist. He is the director of the National Institute on Minority Health and Health Disparities.

== Early life and education ==
Pérez-Stable was born in Cuba. In the early 1960s, his parents, fearful of the communist rise in their country, sent him to the United States to live with his grandparents. He grew up in Miami, Florida. When his parents emigrated, he moved to Pittsburgh. He earned his B.A. in chemistry from the University of Miami and his M.D. from the University of Miami School of Medicine. He completed his primary care internal medicine residency and research fellowship at University of California, San Francisco.

== Career ==
Pérez-Stable began his research at UCSF in the 1980s as a professor of medicine, chief of the Division of General Internal Medicine, and director of the Center for Aging in Diverse Communities (CADC). Through the CADC, he continued his commitment to developing a diverse workforce in clinical and population science research by mentoring and collaborating with many minority fellows and junior faculty from a variety of disciplines. Pérez-Stable was also Director of the UCSF Medical Effectiveness Research Center for Diverse Populations, which addresses issues for African Americans, Asians, and Latinos in the areas of cancer, cardiovascular disease, aging, and reproductive health. As a co-principal investigator of the Redes En Acción National Latino Cancer Control Research and Education Network, Pérez-Stable led the development of a research agenda on tobacco control for minority populations in the United States. In addition, he was an NCI-funded Staff Investigator and Assistant Director for Health Care Disparities at the UCSF Comprehensive Cancer Center as well as a member of the NCI and Legacy Foundation's Tobacco Disparities Research Network (TReND).

Pérez-Stable began as the director of the National Institute on Minority Health and Health Disparities (NIMHD) in September 2015. He oversees the institute's $314 million budget to advance the science of minority health and health disparities. On October 6, 2016, Pérez-Stable announced the formal designation of sexual and gender minorities (SGMs) as a health disparity population for NIH research.

On March 31 during the 2025 United States federal mass layoffs, Pérez-Stable was placed on administrative leave. His departure from NIH on October 1, 2025, ended both his NIMHD directorship and his tenured senior investigator position.

=== Research ===
Pérez-Stable's expertise spans a broad range of health disparities disciplines. His research interests have centered on improving the health of racial and ethnic minorities and underserved populations, advancing patient-centered care, improving cross-cultural communication skills among health care professionals, and promoting diversity in the biomedical research workforce. Pérez-Stable has spent more than 30 years leading research on smoking cessation and tobacco control policy in Latino populations in the United States and Latin America. His collaborations with researchers and public health advocates in Argentina have helped to put tobacco use on the country's public health agenda, raising awareness of tobacco use as a critical public health problem, building capacity for tobacco control policy, and creating opportunities for prevention and treatment measures through physician education and smoking cessation programs. Pérez-Stable served as a member of the National Institute on Aging's Advisory Council from 2011 to 2014 and as the chair of the council's Minority Task Force on Aging from 2012 to 2014. He has authored numerous scientific papers, reviewed articles for a variety of professional publications, and delivered keynote lectures and presentations at many domestic and international conferences.

== Awards and honors ==
Pérez-Stable received UCSF's Kaiser Award for Excellence in Teaching, the Society of General Internal Medicine's John M. Eisenberg National Award for Career Achievement in Research, and election to the National Academy of Medicine. He was honored with the UCSF Lifetime Achievement in Mentoring Award in July 2015.

In 2021, Pérez-Stable and Gary H. Gibbons received the Service to America Medal for starting two NIH outreach programs that partnered with local organizations to educate hesitant communities about COVID-19 testing and vaccine trials.

== Personal life ==
Pérez-Stable has visited Cuba nearly 10 times. In August 2016, he and his wife, Claudia Husni, moved to a residence in Columbia Heights.
