= Fight for Sight (U.S.) =

American nonprofit organization

- Formation: 1946
- Type: Non-profit
- Purpose: Fight For Sight supports eye and vision research by providing funds to promising scientists early in their careers.
- Headquarters: New York, New York, US
- Website: fightforsight.org

Fight for Sight is a nonprofit organization in the United States which funds medical research in vision and ophthalmology. It was formed in 1946 as the National Council to Combat Blindness (NCCB), the first non-profit organization in the United States to fund vision research; 2011 marked its 65th anniversary.

Based in New York City, Fight for Sight provides funding and acknowledgment to promising scientists early in their eye research careers, before they are eligible for government support from the National Institutes of Health. Grants are made in three main categories: Post-doctoral fellowships to those with a Ph.D., M.D., O.D., Dr.PH, or D.V.M.; Grants-in-Aid to junior professors at research universities, and Summer Student Fellowships to medical students, graduate students, and undergraduate students.

Led by its Scientific Review Committee selection process, the organization provides funding for eye and vision diseases and conditions. Fight for Sight has provided support directly or indirectly to major advances in ophthalmology and vision research, including donor cornea preservation, ophthalmic lasers, glaucoma therapies, genetic research, and the intraocular lens (IOL).

Early on, Fight for Sight helped create national awareness and funds for vision research outside of its own fundraising when organization founder Mildred Weisenfeld coordinated testimony on eye research to Congress in 1949, leading to the creation of the National Institute of Neurological Disease and Blindness, and in December 1968 the establishment of the National Eye Institute (NEI) in the National Institutes of Health (NIH).

Although a modest foundation not exceeding $5 million in annual endowment, Fight for Sight had given out more than $20 million in grants to over 3,000 eye researchers by 2009. Fight for Sight celebrated its 65th anniversary in 2011.

Organizational partnerships with Fight for Sight include The Eye-Bank for Sight Restoration, Streilein Foundation for Ocular Immunology, the North American Neuro-Ophthalmology Society, and WomensEyeHealth.org.

Fight for Sight in the U.S. is unaffiliated with the younger organizations with the same name in the UK or in Ireland.

== Notable alumni ==
Numerous leaders in eye and vision research and academia received a Fight for Sight grant early in their careers, including Harold Scheie, MD (1950), who founded the Scheie Eye Institute at the University of Pennsylvania, Arthur Jampolsky, MD (1952), whose efforts led to the creation of the Smith-Kettlewell Eye Research Institute, A. Edward Maumenee, MD (1958) director of the Wilmer Eye Institute, founder of the Eye Bank Association of America and potent force behind the creation of the NEI at the National Institutes of Health, Carl Kupfer, MD (1961), Director of the NEI for 30 years, László Bitó, PhD (1965), who developed the glaucoma drug Xalatan, Robert Machemer, MD (1966) the "father" of modern retinal surgery, Irene H. Maumenee, MD (1973) internationally renowned pediatric ophthalmologist and expert in hereditary eye diseases, David Abramson, MD (1979), renowned for his expertise in treating childhood eye tumors, Paul Sieving, MD, PhD (1980), current Director of the NEI and Jayakrishna Ambati, MD (2002), winner of the ARVO Cogan Award, given for significant scientific accomplishments to a scientist under 40 years old.

== Leaders ==
The organization's identity has been closely aligned with its founder Mildred Weisenfeld, who lost her vision to retinitis pigmentosa two years before starting the nonprofit. Weisenfeld lead the organization as executive director for 50 years, from 1946 to 1996. Among other notable leaders at Fight for Sight were board president Herbert Tenzer, who had been a member of the United States House of Representatives, and comedian Bob Hope who was an honorary chairman from 1960. Other honorary board members included Milton Berle, Ed Sullivan and Sammy Davis Jr.

Weisenfeld was honored many times for her lifelong work in bringing awareness and funding to eye research. On Fight for Sight's 25th anniversary in 1971, she was recognized by congratulatory letters from President Richard Nixon and Fight for Sight supporter New York City Mayor John Lindsay.

The industry group ARVO (Association of Research in Vision and Ophthalmology) honored Fight for Sight's founder by establishing the Weisenfeld Award for Excellence in Ophthalmology in 1986, to annually recognize individuals for scholarly contributions to clinical ophthalmology.

Long term leaders of the board included Hon. Richard Lane and Kenneth Barasch, M.D.

== History ==
First Lady Eleanor Roosevelt wrote about the NCCB in its first year of existence, drawing attention to the goal of raising $50,000 for eye clinics and treat retinitis pigmentosa (RP). Experimental treatments funded by NCCB began the first year at New York Hospital and the N.Y. Medical College of Flower-Fifth Avenue on a few hundred people with RP.

Founder Mildred Weisenfeld, along with blind Attorney General William E. Powers, presented a Norman Rockwell painting to President Harry Truman on September 19, 1950, to honor his signing of legislation aiding the blind. In the same year, Weisenfeld and wealthy New York entrepreneur Mary Lasker encouraged adding the word "blindness" to the founding title of The National Institute of Neurological Disorders and Blindness (NINDB), now the National Institute of Neurological Disorders and Stroke.

Summer Student Fellowships and Post-Doctoral awards were added by the organization in 1955 to encourage young investigators into ophthalmic research, providing a sort of funding "ladder" leading up to Grants-In-Aid.

The name Fight for Sight was officially adopted by the organization in late 1959, and gradually replaced use of the original name National Council to Combat Blindness.

In 1983–84, Fight for Sight had a one-year moratorium on new awards to assess its giving strategy. For a period from 1983 to 1988, the Fight for Sight Awards Program was then administered in association with ARVO, assisted by Arthur M. Silverstein, PhD, of Johns Hopkins. Then in 1988–2002, Fight for Sight affiliated with National Society to Prevent Blindness (which became Prevent Blindness America after 1992) as a "research division," during which ARVO still assisted with the selection of grant recipients. NSPB/PBA contributed funding. In 2003, Fight for Sight returned to selecting grant recipients though its own independent Scientific Review Committee.

== Leagues ==
In 1949, Fight for Sight started a "women's division" which later turned into a few dozen local women's auxiliary leagues in New York, New Jersey, Pennsylvania, and Florida. During their height in the 1980s, they contributed up to $330,000 annually. New York state included one in Manhattan; several in Brooklyn: Park Circle, Bensonhurst, Flatbush, Sheepshead, Shorefront; in Queens: North Shore, Rockaways, Seaside; and others in the Bronx, Westchester, and Long Island (Nassau), there was one for Northern New Jersey, several in Pennsylvania (Philadelphia: Greater, Main Line, Mount Airy, Cheltenham, and Northeast) and five in Florida (South Palm Beach, Hollywood, Delray Beach, Deerfield Beach, Greater Miami).

== "Lights On" fundraiser, celebrity supporters ==
The annual Fight for Sight fundraiser, the "Lights On" variety show, was the organization's signature event and was a who's-who of top singers, comedians, actors and politicians from 1949 into the mid-1990s.

The event launched with the support of Milton Berle, and later led by Bob Hope, with Earl Wilson (columnist) and Harry Helmsley as co-chairman. Honorary Members included Sammy Davis Junior and New York City Mayors John Lindsay and Abraham Beame, as well as Jacob K. Javits, the United States Senator from New York. Events included Barbra Streisand, Stevie Wonder, Liza Minnelli, Yul Brynner, Earl Wilson, Harry Belafonte, Jackie Mason, Ed Sullivan, Pearl Bailey, Mel Allen, Peter Falk, Paul Anka, Eartha Kitt, Tony Randall, Tommy Smothers, Joe Frazier, Jerry Stiller, Carol Channing, Peggy Lee, Kitty Carlisle, and many others. In the early 1960s, Fannie Hurst served as Honorary Chairman of the Women's Division of "Lights On."

In 1960 Bob Hope led a coast-to-coast telecast for Fight for Sight and donated $100,000 to establish the Bob Hope Fight for Sight Fund.

In 2003, Olympic medalist figure skater Nancy Kerrigan became a Fight for Sight spokeswoman.

== Children's Eye Centers and projects abroad ==
A network of Fight for Sight Children's Eye Centers was established beginning in 1961 and were supported through the late 1990s, with some as late as 2005. The first was in New York (at Columbia-Presbyterian Medical Center, and with funding in the mid-1990s from billionaire Harry B. and Leona Helmsley another at Mount Sinai Hospital), Miami (Bascom Palmer Eye Institute), one in Pittsburgh (Children's Hospital of Pittsburgh), three in Philadelphia (Wills Eye Hospital, Temple University School of Medicine and St. Christopher's Hospital for Children), and Newark, New Jersey (Eye Institute of New Jersey, UMDNJ-University of Medicine and Dentistry of New Jersey). The Fight for Sight Children's Eye Center at Columbia is thought to have been the second eye clinic for children in the United States.

Fight for Sight also supported general eye clinics, such as the Harkness Eye Institute at Columbia University, the Philadelphia Geriatric Clinic, and New York–Presbyterian Hospital.

Overseas in the 1960s, Fight for Sight also supported a Mobile Eye Clinic in Jerusalem, Israel, for treatment and eradication of trachoma, and an eye bank at Mahatma Gandhi Memorial College, a corneal research project in Indore, India, and research in Japan, Korea, Turkey, Hungary, Italy, Switzerland, Sweden, Belgium, The Netherlands, England, Argentina, Mexico, and Uganda.
