= Case Comprehensive Cancer Center =

Cancer research institution in Ohio, US

Coordinates: 41.504°N 81.608°W

Case Comprehensive Cancer Center (CCCC) is an NCI-designated Cancer Center in Cleveland, Ohio, affiliated with Case Western Reserve University. It was founded in 1987.

CCCC employs over 370 faculty members. It is a collaborative organization with the Cleveland Clinic Taussig Cancer Institute and University Hospitals Seidman Cancer Center.

Case is organized into six research programs receiving NIH funding. In total, the center has received over $130 million in research funding.
