= National Institute on Minority Health and Health Disparities =

U.S. health institute

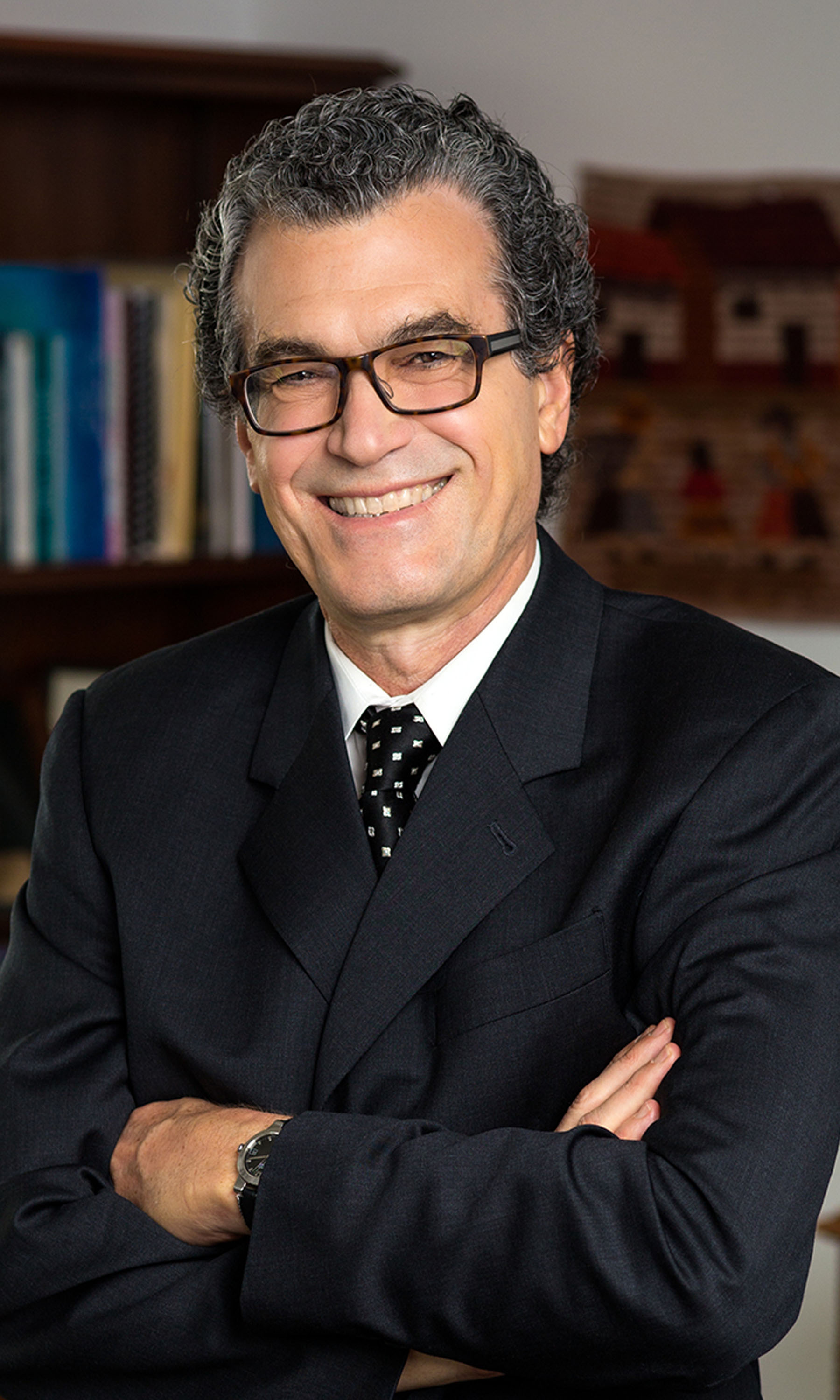
- Eliseo J. Pérez-Stable
- Formation: 2000
- Type: government institute
- Region served: United States
- Director: Eliseo J. Pérez-Stable
- Parent organization: National Institutes of Health
- Website: nimhd.nih.gov
- Formerly called: National Center on Minority Health and Health Disparities

The National Institute on Minority Health and Health Disparities (NIMHD) is an American government health institute. It is part of the National Institutes of Health (NIH). The stated mission of the NIMHD is to "lead scientific research to improve minority health and eliminate health disparities."

== History ==
By the passage of the Minority Health and Health Disparities Research and Education Act, NIMHD was established in 2000 as an NIH center with the initial title of National Center on Minority Health and Health Disparities (NCMHD). It became a full institute, with its present name, on September 13, 2010, under the Affordable Care Act.

== Leadership ==
John Ruffin was the first director of the NIMHD, serving until he retired in 2014. Yvonne T. Maddox became acting director in April 2014. Eliseo Pérez-Stable, MD was appointed director of the National Institute on Minority Health and Health Disparities Research on September 1, 2015.

== Directors ==
Past directors from 1990 - present

No.	Portrait	Director	Took office	Left office	Refs.
1		John Ruffin	August 1990	March 2014	
acting		Yvonne Maddox	April 1, 2014	April 2015	
acting		Lawrence A. Tabak	May 2015	August 2015	
2		Eliseo J. Pérez-Stable	September 2015	April 2025	
acting		Monica Webb Hooper	April 2025	Present	

== Definitions ==
NIMHD addresses disparities in minority health in the United States. It defines minority health as "all aspects of health and disease in one or more racial/ethnic minority populations as defined by the Office of Management and Budget, including Blacks/African Americans, Hispanics/Latinos, Asians, American Indians/Alaska Natives, and Native Hawaiians/other Pacific Islanders." It includes minority classes such as "socioeconomically disadvantaged populations, underserved rural populations, and sexual and gender minorities."

In 2023, NIMHD added people with disabilities to the definition of the population with health disparities, including a new program that funds new research.

== Strategic plan ==
NIMHD is developing the 2021-2025 NIH Minority Health and Health Disparities Strategic Plan, which will outline the immediate goals of the institute. They are defined in three thematic areas: scientific research, research sustaining activities, and outreach, collaboration, and dissemination. The strategic plan is to be released in 2021.

== Research topics ==
Goals in the strategic plan include understanding the causes of minority health disparities, developing interventions to reduce disparities and tools to evaluate the effectiveness of the interventions, increasing minority participation in National Institutes of Health research, and increasing community engagement in the process. Former acting director Maddox describes tailoring research to address many factors, or "health determinants", that contribute to "health burdens" in minority populations, such as "biological risk factors, behavioral risk factors, social/economic factors, health systems, resiliency/protective factors, quality of life experiences, and environmental/physical factors."

Director Pérez-Stable attributes health disparities in African-American communities to "structural racism", which results in segregated neighborhoods, limited access to nutrition, higher levels of environmental pollution, low-quality housing, and inadequate education and employment opportunities, which increase poverty and chronic stress.
