= West Virginia University College of Creative Arts and Media =

Coordinates: 39°38′8.1″N 79°57′18.2″W

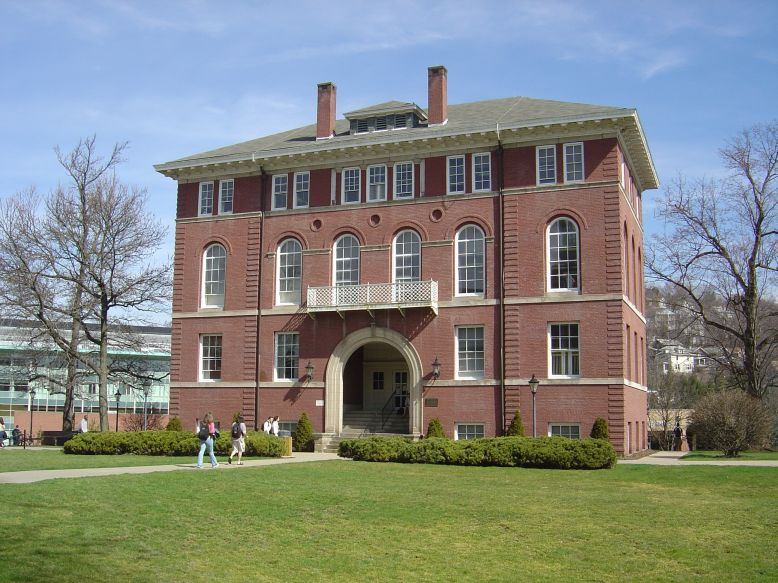
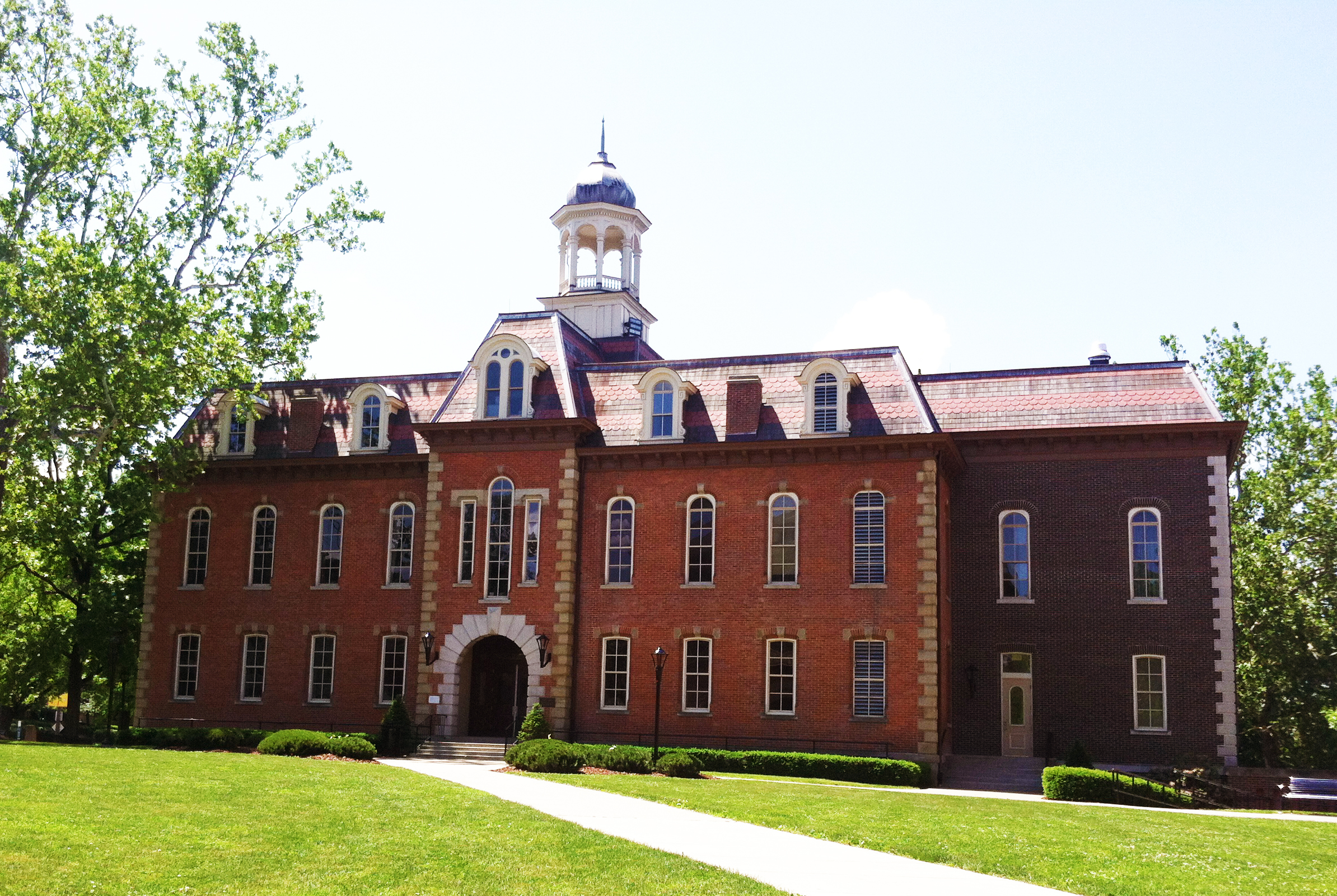
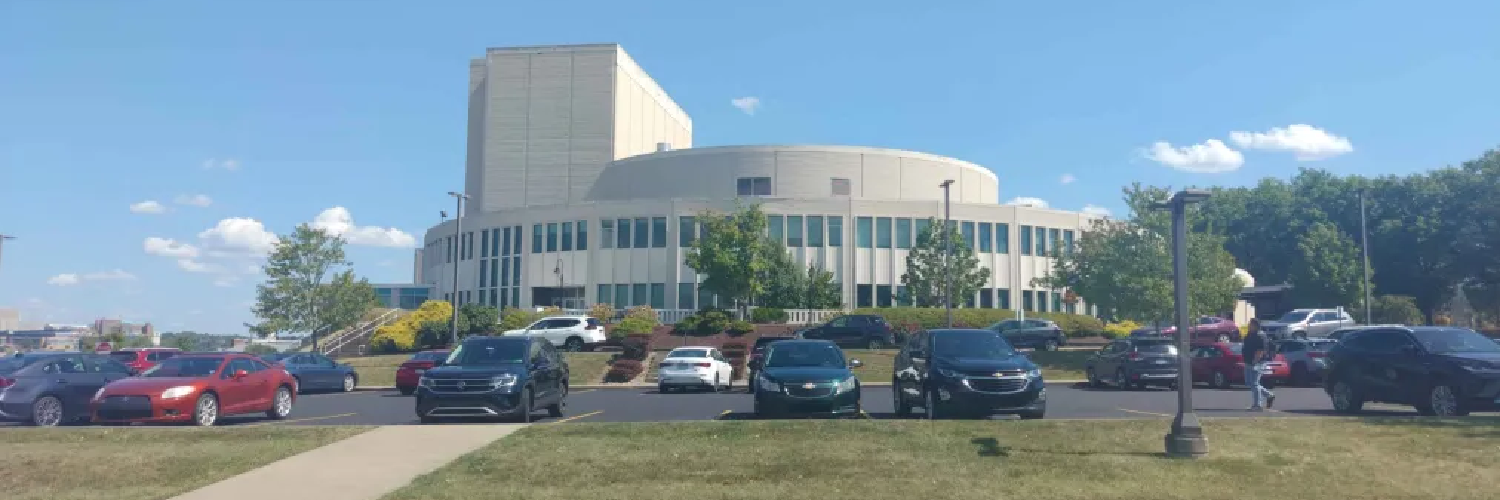
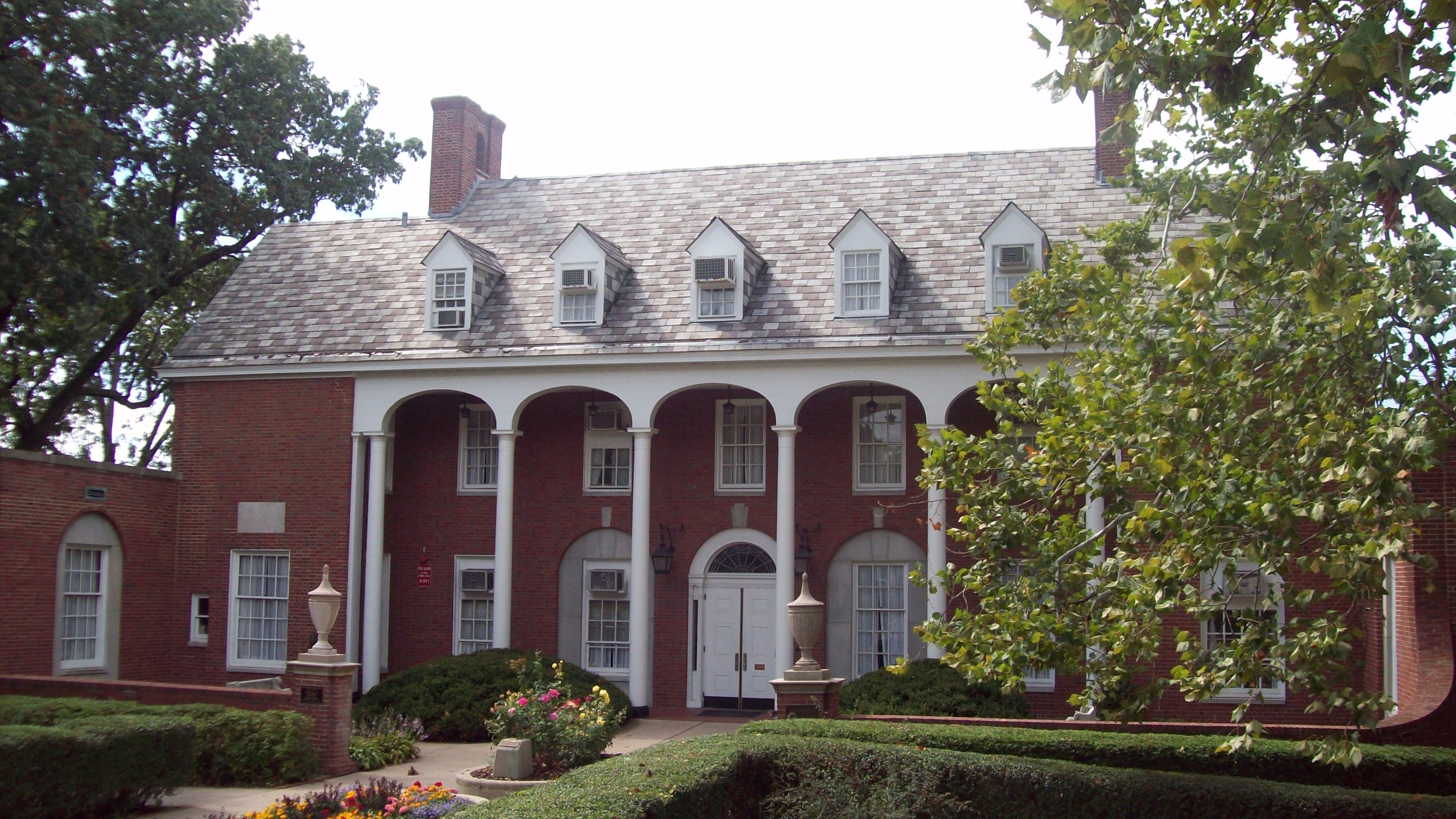
- Chitwood Hall Martin Hall Woodburn Hall Canady Creative Arts Center Elizabeth Moore Hall
- Type: Unit of West Virginia University
- Established: 1939
- Dean: Keith Jackson
- Location: United States
- Campus: Morgantown
- Website: Official website

The West Virginia University College of Media and Creative Arts, also known as the WVU CCAM or WVU College of Media and Creative Arts, is one of the colleges and schools at West Virginia University, located in Morgantown, West Virginia.

== History ==
=== Isaac Reed School of Journalism (1939 - 2014) ===
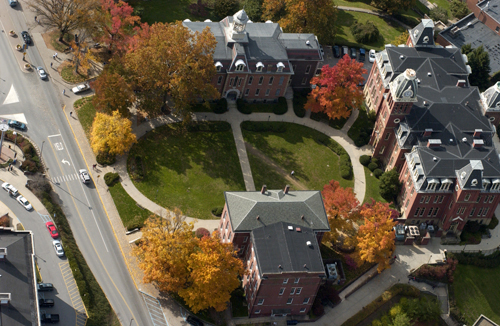
Woodburn Circle in 2004

The WVU Reed College of Media was formerly known as the WVU P.I. Reed School of Journalism until July 1, 2014. It was created by Dr. Perley Isaac Reed. Dr. Reed arrived at West Virginia University in 1920 and was assigned to teach English and Journalism courses at the College of the Arts and Sciences. Soon, Reed made it his personal mission to expand the course load, which also included journalism history, editing, advertisement writing and trade and industrial journalism, in just a few years.

To gain further momentum, Reed used his involvement in the West Virginia State Newspaper Council to improve the press and its profitability. Using their political power they applied pressure and in the year 1927, Journalism became a department and later became a school in 1939.

The school did not have a building to call its home until 1953 when Martin Hall was given to the Journalism school. Prior to that, it had occupied only several rooms nearby in Woodburn Hall.

West Virginia University's Reed College of Media has been located in Martin Hall since 1954. Although the College only began its stay there fifty-four years ago, Martin Hall has been part of Woodburn Circle for decades longer.

=== College of Creative Arts (1969 - 2024) ===
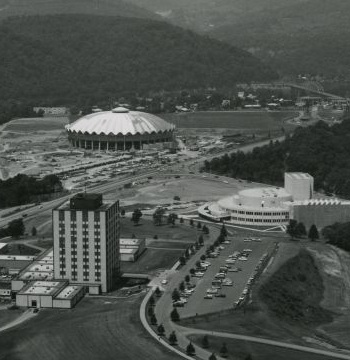
The Engineering Sciences Building, the WVU Coliseum and the Canady Creative Arts Center (left-right) in 1970.

The College of Creative Arts was founded in 1969 to holster theatre and dance, art and design, and music schools.

=== Reed College of Media (2014 - 2024) ===
On February 21, 2014, the Perley Isaac Reed School of Journalism announced that on July 1 its name will be changed to the Reed College of Media.

=== College of Creative Arts and Media (2024 - Present) ===
In 2024, West Virginia University merged the Reed College of Media and the College of Creative Arts.

== Academic programs ==
=== Facilities ===
- Canady Creative Arts Center, creative arts center that is used by the school of theatre and dance, art and design, and music
- Elizabeth Moore Hall, dance hall used by the school of theatre and dance
- Woodburn Circle
  - Chitwood Hall, education building used by the school of Media and Communications
  - Martin Hall, education building used by the school of Media and Communications
  - Woodburn Hall, education building used by the school of Media and Communications

== Notable faculty ==
- Mary McClung, professor of puppetry and costume design
- Jerry McGonigle, former professor of acting

== See also ==
- West Virginia Public Theatre
