= Morgantown Marathon =

Annual marathon race in West Virginia

- Date: September
- Location: Morgantown, WV
- Event type: Road
- Distance: Marathon and half marathon
- Established: 2015
- Website: http://morgantownmarathon.com/

The Morgantown Marathon is a 42.195 km (26.2 mi) race run through the seven wards of Morgantown, West Virginia. Its inaugural run was held in 2015. An official time from the Morgantown Marathon can be used as a qualifying event for the Boston Marathon. In addition to the full marathon race, the Morgantown Marathon also includes an 8K race (‘The Mountain Mama 8K”) and a half-marathon.

The 2020 edition of the race was cancelled due to the coronavirus pandemic, with all registrants given the option of transferring their entry to 2021 or obtaining a full refund.

== Course ==
External image
- Course map of full marathon in 2019

The Morgantown Marathon is notable for its difficult course. Although the marathon course begins and ends at the WVU Coliseum—home of West Virginia University basketball games—runners navigate numerous elevation changes over the intermediate 26.2 miles. The final mile is among the steepest sections of the course, rising from the downtown area adjacent to the Monongahela River to finish line at the WVU Coliseum.

== Tagline ==
The Morgantown Marathon's tagline is "26.2 Almost Heavenly Miles." This motto comes from the song "Take Me Home, Country Roads" by John Denver where the state is referred to as "almost heaven."

== Winners ==
Key: Course record

Ed.	Year	Men's winner	Time	Women's winner	Time	Rf.
1	2015	Greg Rolfes (USA)	2:43:39.97	Kassandra Marin (USA)	3:24:28.04	
2	2016	Bryan Morseman (USA)	2:33:30.03	Clara Santucci (USA)	2:58:11.61	
3	2017	Bryan Morseman (USA)	2:32:36.60	Monicah Wahome (USA)	3:21:47.75	
4	2018	Bryan Morseman (USA)	2:33:27.62	Kate Hails (USA)	3:04:54.23	
5	2019	Bryan Morseman (USA)	2:33:29.78	Kate Hails (USA)	3:10:13.21	
	2020	cancelled due to coronavirus pandemic				
