= West Virginia Public Theatre =

Theatre company in West Virginia, USA

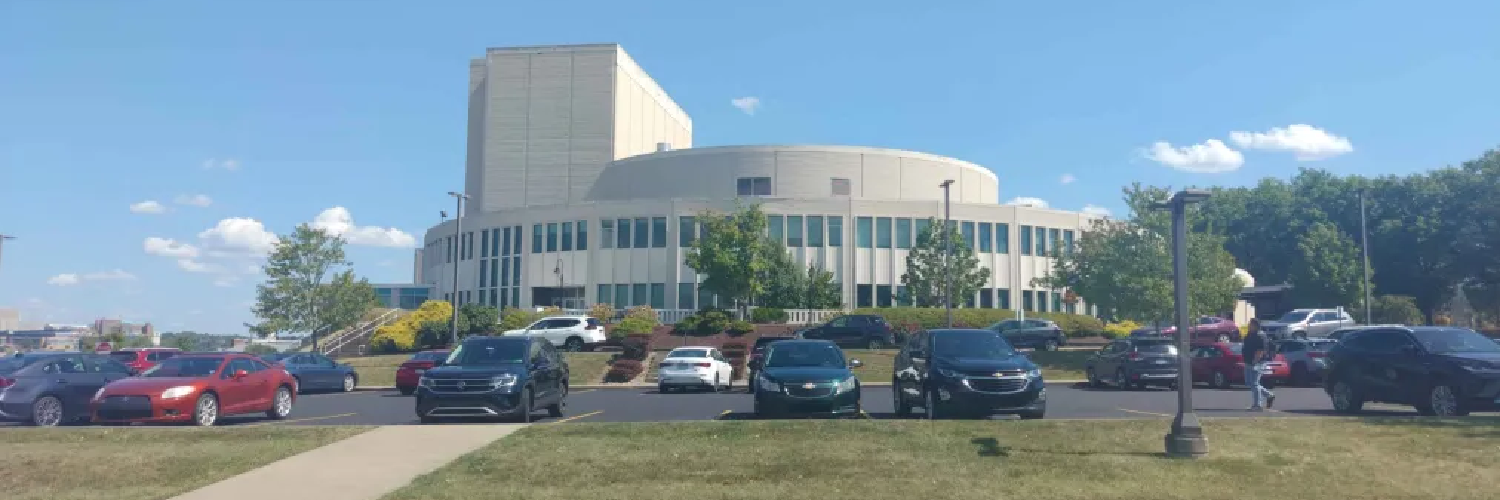
- West Virginia Public Theatre headquarters at the Canady Creative Arts Center (2024)
- Abbreviation: WVPT
- Formation: 1988; 38 years ago
- Type: Nonprofit
- Headquarters: Morgantown, West Virginia, United States
- Region served: West Virginia
- Services: Theatre
- Official language: English
- Website: https://wvpublictheatre.org

West Virginia Public Theatre (WVPT) is a nonprofit professional theatre company based in Morgantown, West Virginia, United States. Founded in 1988, the organization produces union theatrical productions and provides educational and community outreach programming throughout north-central West Virginia.

== History ==
West Virginia Public Theatre was founded in 1988 to expand access to professional theatre in West Virginia. Since its establishment, the company has operated continuously, presenting annual seasons of theatrical productions and developing a reputation as one of the longest-running professional theatre organizations in the state.

Over the decades, WVPT has produced hundreds of performances, encompassing classical theatre, contemporary drama, musical theatre, and family-oriented productions. The organization has frequently collaborated with regional artists and educators and has maintained an ongoing relationship with West Virginia University's College of Creative Arts.

== Productions ==
The West Virginia Public Theatre presents a seasonal lineup of professional productions, typically staged in venues throughout the Morgantown area. Its repertoire has included classic American plays, contemporary works, and musicals. Productions are often cast with a mix of professional performers, guest artists, and emerging theatre practitioners.

== Notable staff ==
- Mary McClung, costume and puppet designer
- Jerry McGonigle, art director
