= Woodburn Circle =

- U.S. National Register of Historic Places
- U.S. Historic district
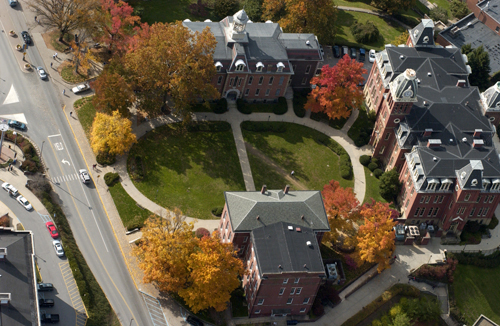
- Woodburn Circle. clockwise: Martin Hall; Woodburn Hall and Chitwood Hall.

- Location within West Virginia Location within the United States
- Location: University Ave., West Virginia University, Morgantown, West Virginia
- Coordinates: 39°38′9″N 79°57′35″W
- Area: 1 acre (0.40 ha)
- Built: 1870, 1876, 1893
- Architects: Jacobs, Elmer F.
- Architectural style: Predominantly Second Empire
- NRHP reference No.: 74002014
- Added to NRHP: December 4, 1974

Woodburn Circle, also known as WVU Quadrangle, is part of the downtown campus of West Virginia University, located in Morgantown, West Virginia, United States. The circle, in reality a quadrangle grouped around an oval path, is a historic and distinctive architectural assembly of three collegiate buildings, which evolved in the late 19th century. In chronological order these are Martin Hall, Woodburn Hall, and Chitwood Hall. The largest of the buildings, Woodburn Hall, has become the best known and is a symbol of the university.

The circle's Martin Hall is West Virginia University's oldest campus building and was constructed in 1870 as University Hall, and renamed Martin Hall in 1889. The circle's centerpiece, what is now Woodburn Hall, was finished in 1876, under the name New Hall. The circle finally became complete with the addition of Chitwood hall in 1893.

Woodburn Circle was listed on the National Register of Historic Places in 1974.

== Woodburn Hall ==
Woodburn Hall

Woodburn Hall, first known as University Hall, is the central and dominating building of Woodburn Circle. It was built between 1874 and 1876, and like its neighbor, the earlier Martin Hall, is in a predominantly red brick Second Empire style building under a mansard roof. It is considered one of the finest examples of Second Empire architecture in the State of West Virginia.

Designed by Wheeling architect C. C. Kemble, the building is of four floors; the first being a pale stone rustic, contrasting with the red brick above, and the third: an attic floor contained within the mansard roof. The principal facade is dominated by an Italianate central belvedere tower surmounted by a square based dome, which since 1910 has contained the Seth Thomas clock, originally in the cupola of Martin Hall. Secondary flanking wings, designed by Morgantown architect Elmer F. Jacobs, extending the facade, and two further towers were built between 1900 and 1911.

The initial cost of building the hall, $41,500, was funded by a state property tax, levied at a rate of five cents per $100 of property In 2010, the building was subject to a $3.9 million restoration project; this included a new roof, the replacement the long lost iron finials to the towers and the implementation of modern safety features, not considered necessary in the nineteenth century.

Since its completion, the building has had many uses. As one of the university's iconic buildings, it has seen the inaugurations of the University presidents and been the setting for the reception of US presidents. Since the turn of the twentieth century it has housed the College of Arts and Sciences.

The hall's name references Woodburn Female Seminary, a school originally located on the West Virginia University campus.

Woodburn Hall houses general education classrooms and administrative offices of the Eberly College of Arts and Sciences. Starting in 2025, Michael T. Benson has re-instituted the lightning of Woodburn Hall to celebrate the Christmas season.

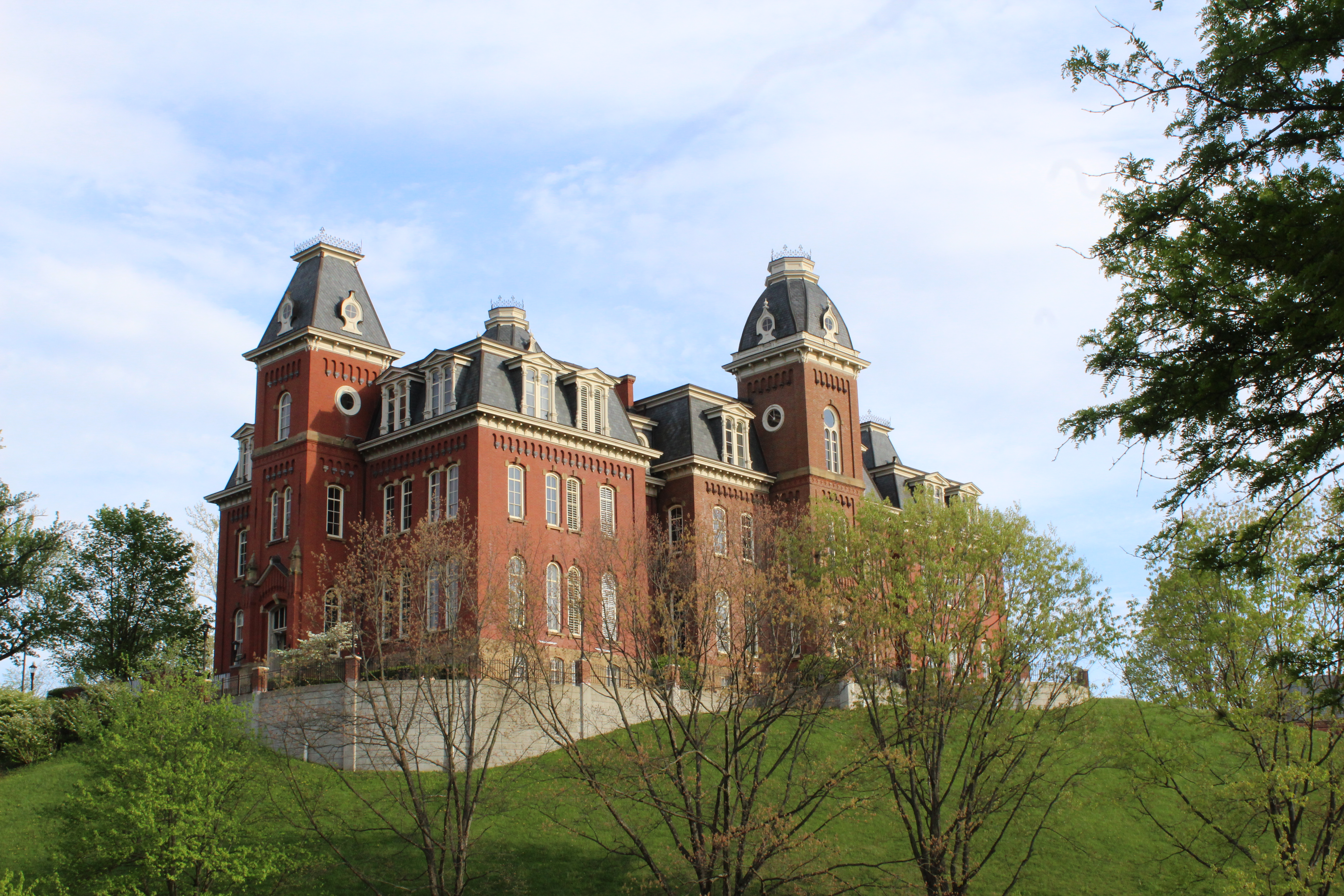
Woodburn Hall from the viewpoint of the Life Science Building green area.

== Martin Hall ==
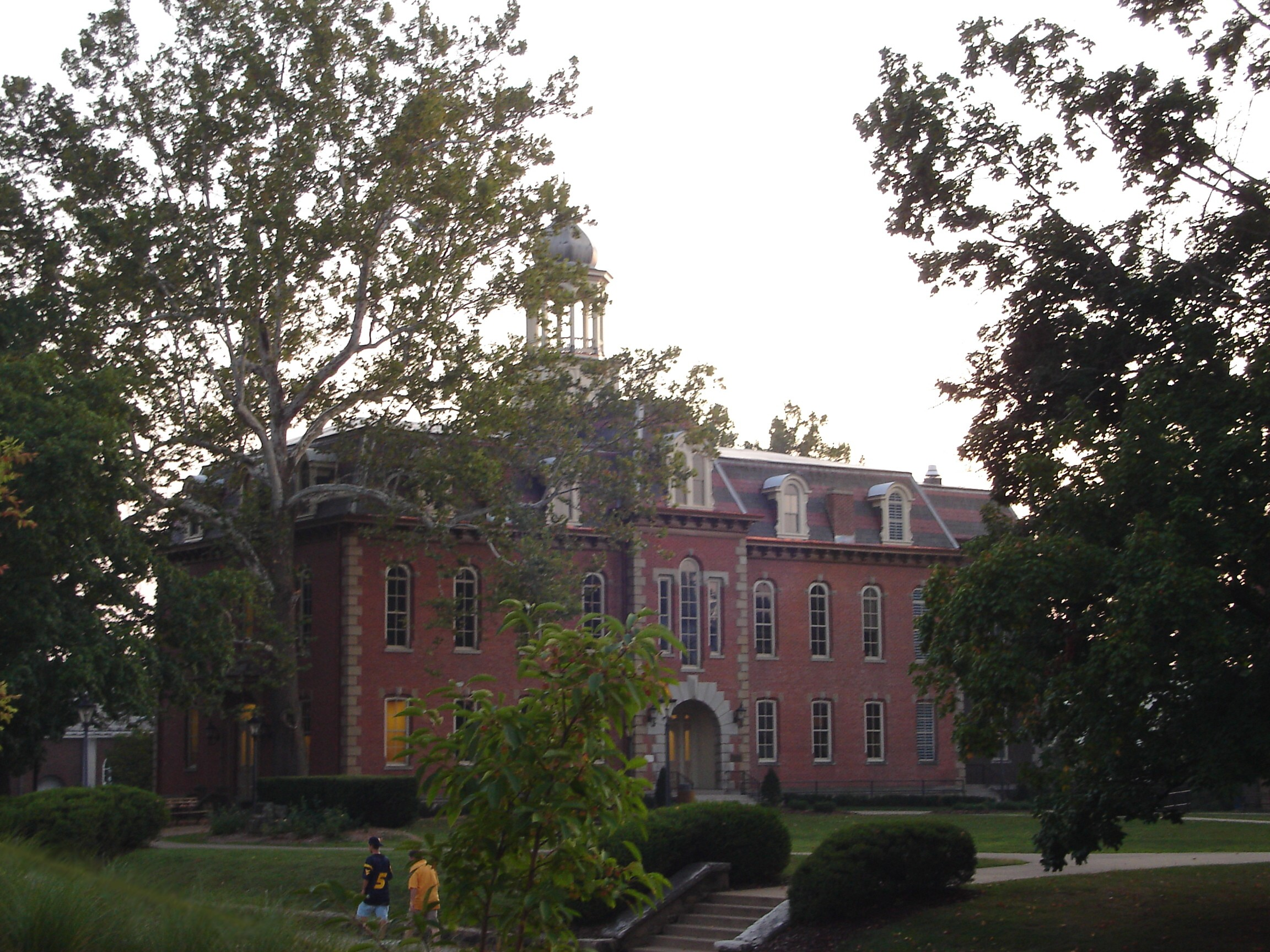
Martin Hall

Martin Hall was built in 1870 at a cost of $22,855, and is the oldest building in Woodburn Circle. It is constructed of brick and has a mansard roof with slate shingles. The architecture is of the Second Empire Eclectic style, with two principal floors, plus an attic floor and a rusticated semi-basement. The facade has nine bays, the central bay being slightly projected with a narrow Venetian window at its center on the first floor.

The roof is surmounted by a wooden octagonal cupola crowned with an onion dome. The cupola was originally adorned with the Seth Thomas clock, which today is housed in the central tower of Woodburn Hall.

As late as 1910, photographs show that Martin Hall originally had a central projecting pillared stone porch resembling a closed porte cochere; this has been removed and replaced by more simple arched entrance, which reflects that of the later Chitwood hall opposite.

Martin Hall commemorates Alexander Martin, the first president of West Virginia University, and is today home to the university's Reed College of Media.

== Chitwood Hall ==
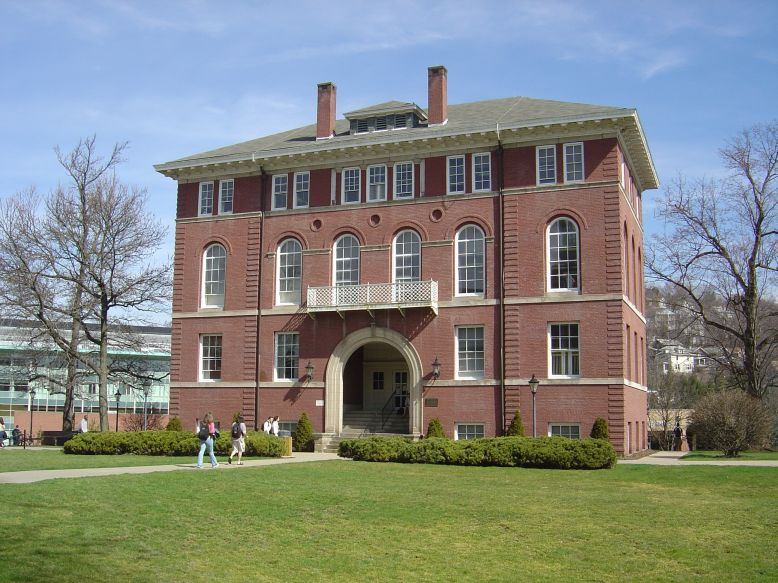
Chitwood Hall

Chitwood Hall, the newest of the three building, was originally known as Science Hall. It was built in 1893 and is a three-story brick building designed in a loose Queen Anne style with a Venetian influence, which makes it architecturally at odds with its two neighbors.

The principal facade is of six bays, the central four bays are recessed; the projection of the two terminating bays is accentuated by brick quoining. The ground and first floors, separated from the floors above them by pale stone banding, are pierced by a massive segmented entrance in the manner of a portal to a Venetian palazzo. Behind this portal, broad stairs rise immediately to the first floor as if those entering may need to escape the rising waters of the Grand Canal.

The second floor, which has tall segmented windows, has the external appearance of a piano nobile; this is accentuated by a projecting iron central balcony over the entrance below. Originally, the segmented windows of this story were shorter with blind brick recesses beneath them; however, they have since been extended into the recesses and now reach to the floor.

The windows of the top floor are far shorter than those of the floors below and the rhythm of the fenestration is faster, being two windows to each of those on the floors below. Originally the central recess on this floor formed an open loggia, this would have continued the Venetian palazzo theme of the balcony above a massive portal below; this loggia has now been closed and glazed to match the flanking windows.

The building has a slate shingled hipped roof with dormer. The hall was renamed in 1972, in honor of Dr. Oliver P. Chitwood.

Chitwood Hall was renovated in 2021 and, as of 2024, houses WVU's Department of History.

== Popular culture ==
- Woodburn Hall is a location in Fallout 76

== Gallery ==
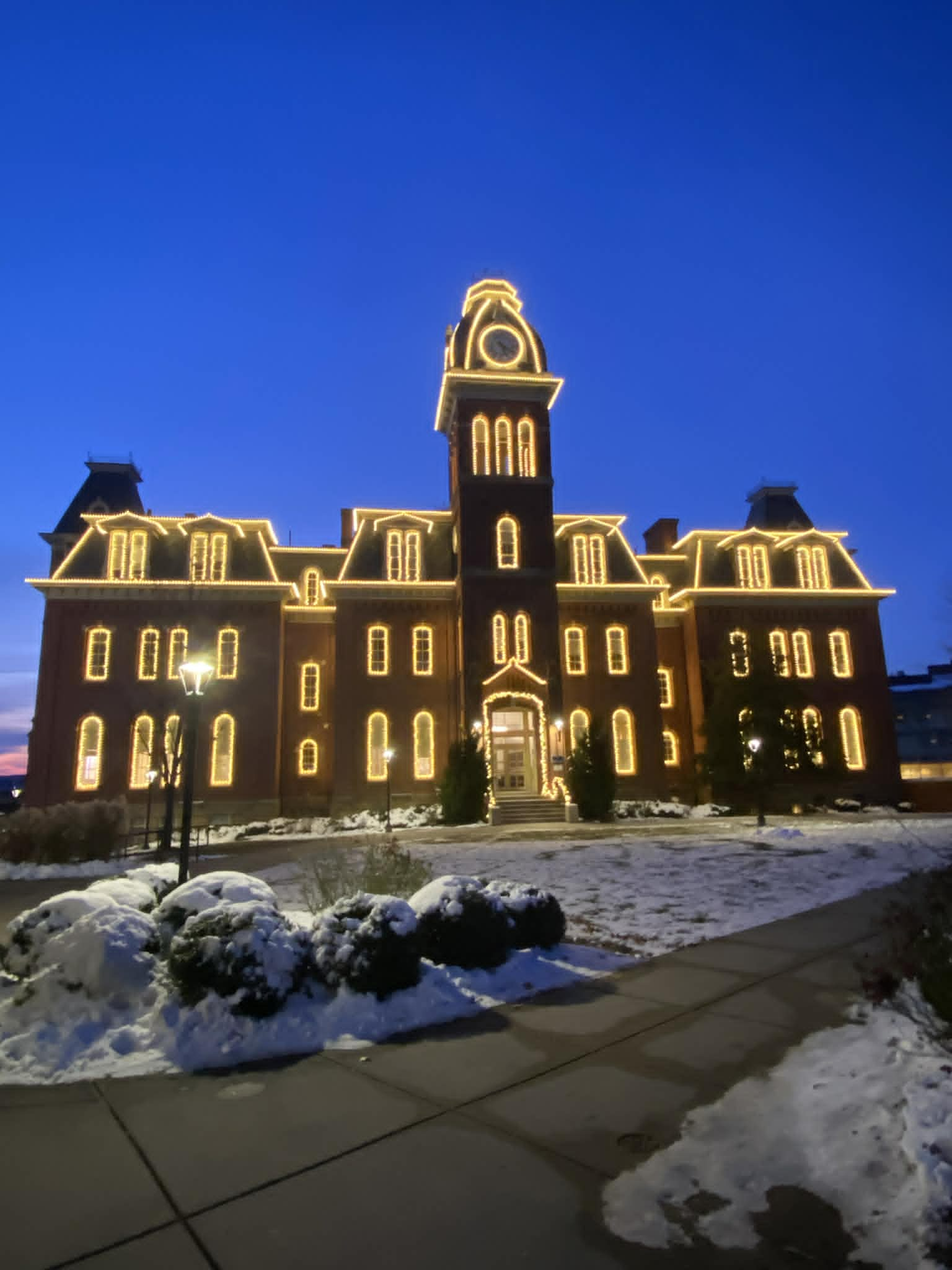
Woodburn Hall adorned with annual Christmas lighting.
