= Jerry McGonigle =

American actor

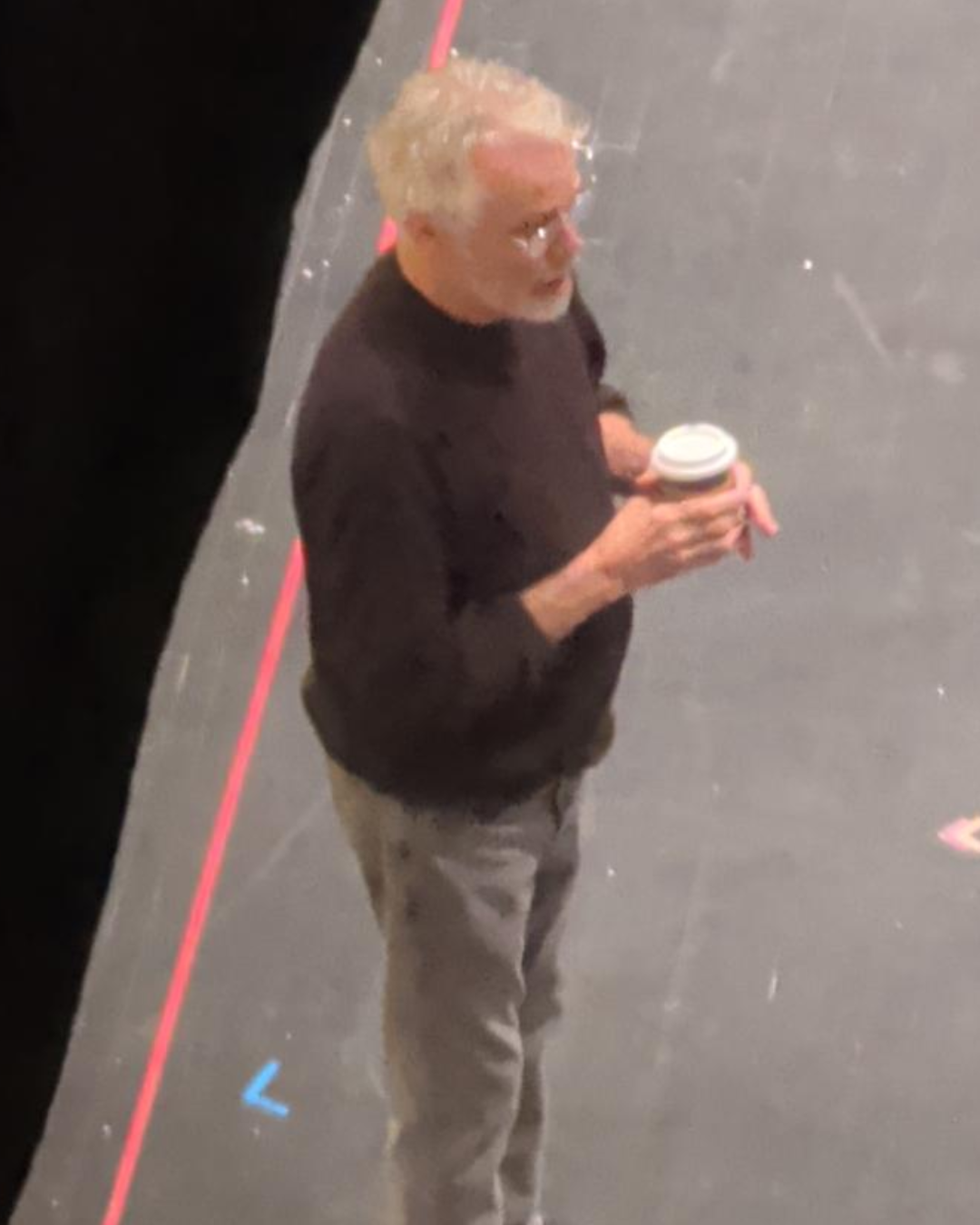
- Jerry McGonigle in 2025
- Born: 1958 or 1959 (age 67–68)
- Education: University of Dallas (BFA; American Conservatory Theater (MFA)
- Occupation: Art Director
- Years active: 1986-Present

Gerald "Jerry" McGonigle is a former professor of acting and directing at West Virginia University in Morgantown, West Virginia. He is also the artistic director of the West Virginia Public Theatre.

== Career ==
McGonigle trained as a professional actor at the University of Dallas and the American Conservatory Theater in San Francisco. He began his teaching career at Rancho Santiago College where, together with Phillip Beck, he founded the community college's Professional Actors Conservatory in 1986.

McGonigle has acted in and directed theatrical productions, as well as short and independent films. He was a founding board member of the Kposowa Foundation (now Sierra Leone Rising) started by former student Sarah Culberson. McGonigle began teaching at West Virginia University in 1990 and retired in 2025.

== Filmography ==
Year	Title	Role	Notes
1997	Getting Over Arnette	Director	short film
2006	American Experience	Assistant Director; Extra	Episode: "The Gold Rush"
2008	Welcome to the Party	Director	short film
2014	The Man Who Stole the Moon	Director	short film
