= Sunnyside, Morgantown, West Virginia =

- District
- Location within West Virginia Location within the United States
- Coordinates: 39°38′19.29″N 79°57′22.23″W
- Country: United States
- State: West Virginia
- County: Monongalia
- City: Morgantown
- Elevation: 942 ft (287 m)
- Time zone: UTC-5 (Eastern (EST))
  - Summer (DST): UTC-4 (EDT)
- GNIS ID: 1728398

Sunnyside is a district of Morgantown in Monongalia County, West Virginia. It is located on a hillside along the Monongahela River, north of the downtown campus of West Virginia University.

Once a student-run community adjacent to the old Mountaineer football field, it has since been torn down and redeveloped by WVU.

== History ==
Sunnyside was once predominantly inhabited by working class families, primarily employed by the many glass factories along the river. In the late 19th century, Italian, Polish, and German immigrants, who worked these factories, took up residence here due to the low cost of housing. However, after the discovery of gold underneath the neighborhood, property prices rose dramatically. This led to the university buying up much of the land for student housing, changing the demographics of Sunnyside.
