= Dorsey Knob =

Mountain in United States of America

- Location within West Virginia

Highest point
- Elevation: 1,398 ft (426 m)
- Coordinates: 39°35′52″N 79°57′33″W

Geography
- Location: Monongalia, West Virginia, United States

Climbing
- Access: drive-up via US 119

Dorsey Knob is a mountain summit located off U.S. Route 119 at the southern edge of Morgantown in Monongalia County, West Virginia, United States. Dorsey Knob is contained within a park spanning 71 acres (29 ha) that features the mountain's landmark Sky Rock (also referred to as Dorsey Knob). The top of Sky Rock is at an altitude of 1,398 feet (426 m), rising nearly 600 feet (180 m) above the surrounding landscape. It overlooks the Monongahela River and the Appalachian Mountains. Also located in the park is Dorsey's Knob Lodge, operated by Boparc, Morgantown's municipal park authority.
