= West Run Expressway =

Proposed Route

Interstate 268
- West Run Expressway

Route information
- Maintained by WVDOH
- NHS: Entire route

Location
- Country: United States
- State: West Virginia

Highway system
- Interstate Highway System; Main; Auxiliary; Suffixed; Business; Future; West Virginia State Highway System; Interstate; US; State

The West Run Expressway is a proposed four-lane expressway that would bypass Morgantown, West Virginia, to the northeast, connecting Interstate 68 (I-68) east of the city at milepost 7 to I-79 north of the city. The western terminus would be somewhere between exit 155 and the West Virginia Welcome Center at milepost 160 along I-79. It would relieve congestion along U.S. Highway 119 (US 119) and West Virginia Route 705 (WV 705), the latter of which might be relieved with the 705 Connector.

The West Run Expressway was referred to as Interstate 268 according to a Dominion Post article in December 2002, however, the accuracy of that may be in doubt. The bypass is being designed not as a controlled-access freeway, but as a limited-access expressway, therefore not up to Interstate Highway standards.

According to the unfunded project index from the West Virginia Department of Transportation, the West Run Expressway was to have preliminary engineering completed in 2007, with right-of-way purchased in 2008.

As of 2012, this project is in limbo as the preferred corridor is now mostly developed with student housing complexes built outside of Morgantown city limits. The WV 705 Connector project is seemingly replacing it for the time being as the Mileground will be reconfigured and widened to a four-lane highway that will alleviate traffic flow. However, the possibility remains that a beltway may be constructed, following Point Marion Road/US 119 to Baker's Ridge and eventually connecting back into the original preferred route near Star City.
