= Canady Creative Arts Center =

Creative arts center in West Virginia, United States

- "The CAC"
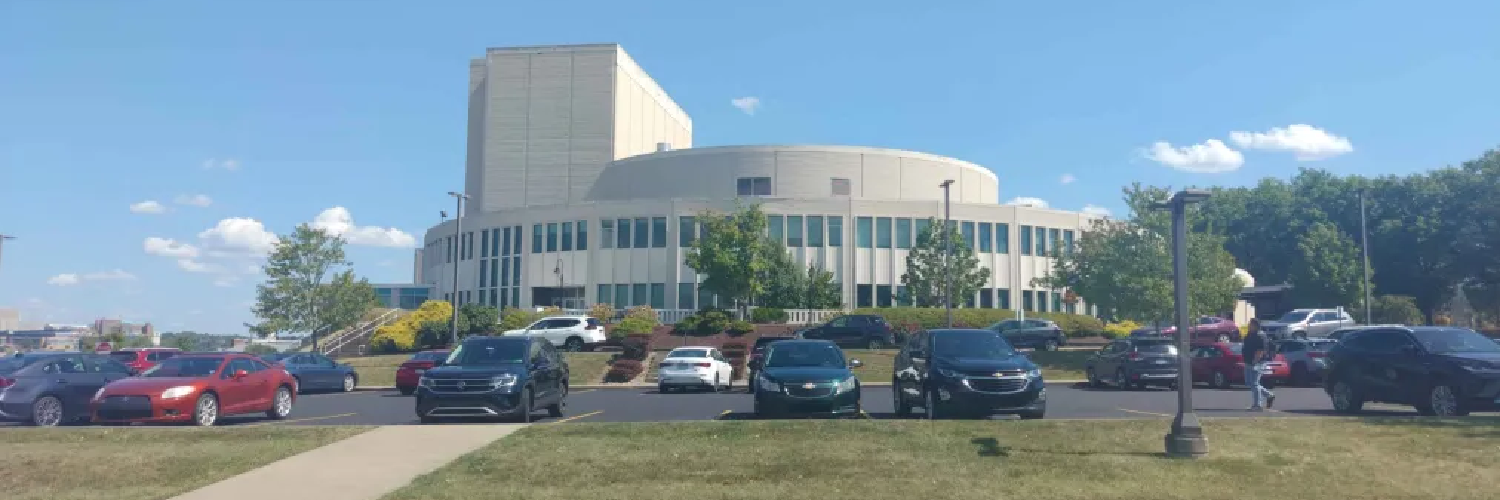
- Canady Creative Arts Center in 2024.
- Former names: West Virginia University Creative Arts Center (1969-2020)

General information
- Type: Creative Arts Center
- Location: 1436 Evansdale Dr, Morgantown, West Virginia 26505, United States
- Named for: Loulie Canady; Valerie Canady; William Canady
- Opened: 1969
- Owner: West Virginia University

Technical details
- Floor count: 5

Website
- Official website

The Canady Creative Arts Center is a creative arts building located in Morgantown, West Virginia, next to the Hope Coliseum.

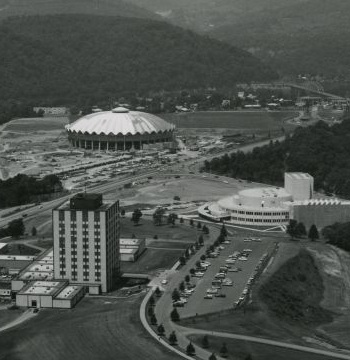
WVU's Evansdale campus around 1970, showing the Engineering Sciences Building, the Hope Coliseum and the Canady Creative Arts Center (left-right)

== History ==
=== West Virginia University Creative Arts Center (1969–2020) ===
The West Virginia University Creative Arts Center opened in 1969 after the expansion of West Virginia University's Evansdale campus. Upon opening, the WVU schools of Theatre and Dance, Arts and Design, and Music were moved into the Creative Arts Center from their previous respective buildings.

Multiple tenants have moved into the Canady Creative Arts Center including the West Virginia University Arts and Entertainment, and the West Virginia Public Theatre. Both groups use the Canady Creative Arts Center's resources to host events to the public.

=== Canady Creative Arts Center (2020–present) ===
In 2020 West Virginia University renamed the West Virginia University Creative Arts Center to the Canady Creative Arts Center, after Loulie, Valerie and William Canady.

In 2024, the West Virginia College of Creative Arts and College of Media merged creating the College of Arts and Media, which expanded the use of the Canady Creative Arts Center to the former Reed College of Media.

== Features ==
=== Venues ===
==== Antoinette E. Falbo Theatre ====
The Antoinette E. Falbo Theatre, named after Antoinette E. Falbo, is a black box theatre that holds a house size of up to 150.

==== Bloch Learning and Performance Hall ====
The Bloch Learning and Performance Hall, named after Stephanie Bloch, is a recital hall that holds a house size of 155.

==== Gladys G. Davis Theatre ====
The Gladys G. Davis Theatre, named after Gladys G. Davis, is a thrust theatre that holds a house size of 212.

==== Lyell B. Clay Concert Theatre ====
The Lyell B. Clay Concert Theatre, named after Lyell B. Clay former philanthropist and executive of Clay Communications Inc., is the largest venue within the Canady Creative Arts Center. It includes a 1,440-seat house, with a 60 feet, in width, proscenium stage.

==== Vivian Davis Michael Laboratory Theatre ====
The Vivian Davis Michael Laboratory Theatre, named after Vivian Davis Michael, is a proscenium style theatre that seats up to 75 people.

=== Other features ===
- Möller pipe organ

== See also ==
- West Virginia Public Theatre
