= Mary McClung =

American theatrical puppet and costume designer

- Born: Belington, West Virginia
- Citizenship: United States
- Occupation: Professor
- Spouse: Alan McEwen

Academic background
- Education: Alfred University (BFA); West Virginia University (MFA)

Academic work
- Discipline: Costume design Puppetry; Theatre
- Institutions: West Virginia University; Whitman College; University of Dallas

Mary McClung is a professor of theatrical costume design and puppetry at West Virginia University.

== Early life ==
McClung is a native of Belington, West Virginia, and graduated from Philip Barbour High School. She initially pursued ceramics, earning a Bachelor of Fine Arts degree from Alfred University. After graduating, McClung operated a small pottery studio in Belington. A friend encouraged her to visit West Virginia University to meet Professor Joann Siegrist, a puppetry designer. McClung was offered a teaching assistantship and enrolled at WVU to study costume design and puppetry in the College of Creative Arts during the 1990s. She earned her Master of Fine Arts in costume design from WVU in 1994.

== Career ==
=== Teaching ===
After graduating from WVU in 1994, McClung joined Animax Designs in Nashville, Tennessee, where she worked on projects for Disney, Sesame Workshop, and Universal Studios.

McClung subsequently accepted a teaching position at the University of Dallas. Her costume designs for The Beggar's Opera in 2002 won a Dallas Critics' award. During this period, while working at the Colorado Shakespeare Festival, she met her future husband, Alan McEwen, a lighting and sound designer. She later moved to Washington to teach at Whitman College in Walla Walla, where McEwen served as lead lighting designer and technical director. In 2006, McClung returned to West Virginia University to head the costume design program. Her husband Alan also joined the Division of Theatre and Dance faculty, teaching lighting and sound design.

In 2010, she received a Design Expo award from the United States Institute for Theatre Technology, for her costumes designed for The Elementals, a WVU dance concert piece. The five costumes represented wind, water, earth, fire, and the moon, and were inspired by a Gamelan piece she heard at a WVU World Music concert. All costumes for The Elementals were created from donated wedding dresses, with additional elements made from recycled materials, including milk jugs.

When her mentor Joann Siegrist retired in 2015, McClung inherited leadership of the WVU Puppet Mobile, which has brought live theatrical performances to communities across West Virginia for over 30 years. As part of the School of Theatre and Dance, the Puppet Mobile tours elementary schools throughout the state, performing shows. McClung views these tours as both educational outreach and professional training for students in WVU's Puppetry program, one of only two such programs in the United States.

=== Authorship ===
McClung wrote two books published by Routledge, Mask Making Techniques and Foam Patterning and Construction Techniques.

== Popular culture ==
- McClung appeared in the 2024 documentary The Last Puppet Show.
