= Hope Coliseum =

Arena in Morgantown, West Virginia

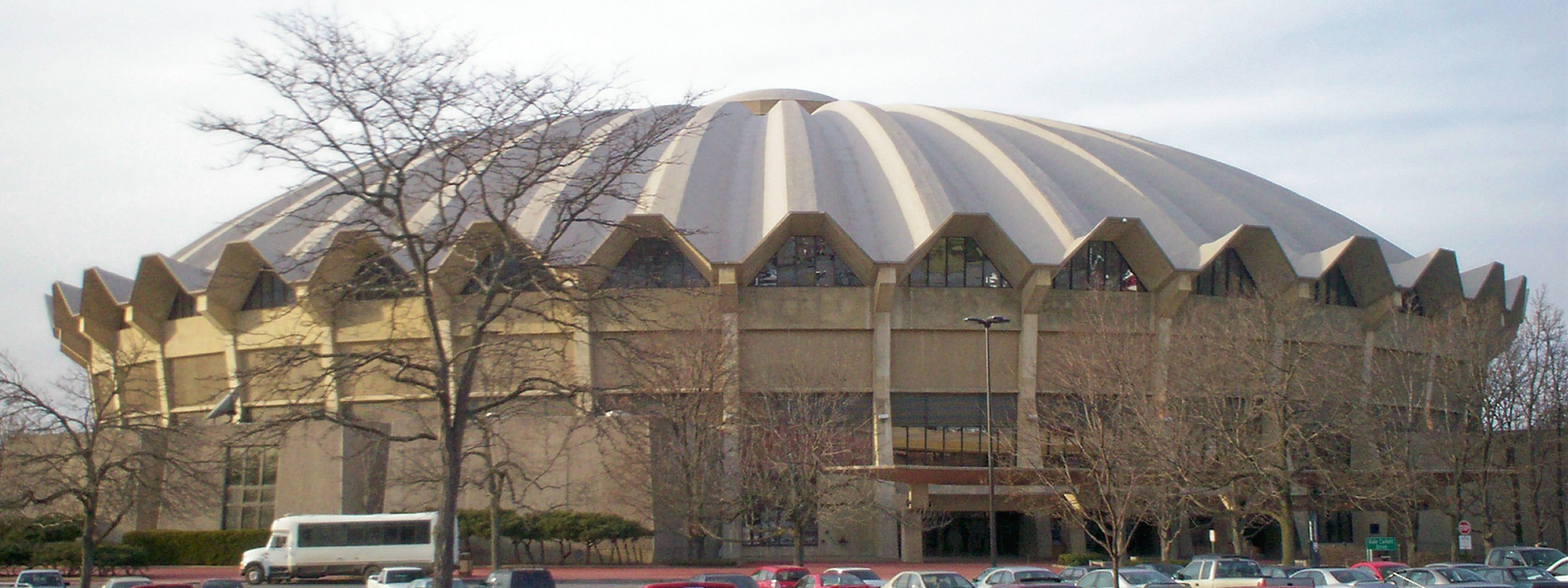
- The Hope Coliseum in 2006.
- Interactive map of Hope Coliseum
- Former names: WVU Coliseum (1970–2025)
- Location: Monongahela Boulevard; Morgantown, WV 26505
- Coordinates: 39°38′57″N 79°58′52″W
- Owner: West Virginia University
- Operator: West Virginia University
- Capacity: 14,000
- Surface: Hardwood

Construction
- Groundbreaking: December 21, 1968
- Opened: December 1, 1970
- Cost: $10.4 million ($86.2 million in 2025 dollars)
- Structural engineer: Osborn Engineering https://www.osborn-eng.com/
- General contractor: McDevitt & Street Co.

Tenants
- West Virginia Mountaineers (NCAA); Men's basketball (1970–present); Women's basketball (1973–present); Women's volleyball (1973–present); Women's gymnastics (1973–present); Wrestling (1970–present)

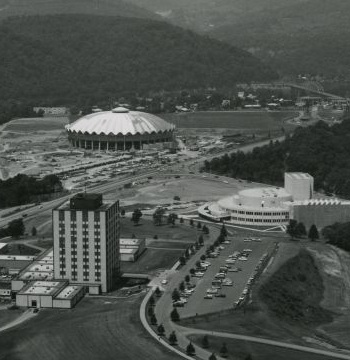
WVU's Evansdale campus around 1970, showing the Engineering Sciences Building, the Hope Coliseum and the Canady Creative Arts Center (left-right).

Hope Coliseum is a 14,000-seat multi-purpose arena located on the Evansdale campus of West Virginia University in Morgantown, West Virginia. The circular arena features a poured concrete roof. It was built with state funds and replaced the WVU Fieldhouse, which seated 6,000.

== History ==
Hope Coliseum, which opened in 1970, has more than 10.5 million cubic feet (300,000 m^{3}) of space. It is home to West Virginia University Mountaineers sports teams, including the men's and women's basketball teams, men's wrestling, and women's volleyball and gymnastics. There is also a 3,000-square-foot (280 m^{2}) weight room located in the lower level of the Coliseum. The arena has nearly 100 offices, 13 lecture and seminar rooms, a dance studio, safety lab, racquetball and squash courts, and the Jerry West Mountaineer Room, which holds nearly 150 people for meetings. The arena also has more than 1,000 individual locker units in various dressing rooms available for students and staff.

Hope Coliseum has been used for music concerts but the concrete roof has poor sound distribution properties, so other venues in town are more appropriate for this purpose. The arena was actually designed with poor acoustics; the designers cupped the ceiling so that crowd noise generated at basketball games would be directed back to the floor. The seating at the venue was also designed for optimized viewing during sporting events, making the setup for concerts to be not as optimal as other large arenas.

Despite this, WVU Arts & Entertainment has presented over 100 concerts throughout the history of the Coliseum.

The first event held at the Coliseum was a Grand Funk Railroad concert on September 19, 1970 ,with the first game then taking place on December 1, 1970. The Coliseum was one of the sites for games of the 1974 NCAA Men's Division I Basketball Tournament. Other National Collegiate Athletic Association (NCAA) men's Division I college basketball events it has hosted include the ECAC South Region tournament organized by the Eastern College Athletic Conference (ECAC) in 1975 and 1976 and the Atlantic 10 Conference men's basketball tournament in 1984 and 1988.

During the 1998-99 season, the Jerry West Lounge, named for WVU and NBA Hall-of-Famer Jerry West, was formally dedicated. A display showcasing the highlights of the Mountaineer great flanks the entrance to the lounge. In November 2005, the University announced that a life size bronze statue of West would adorn the Blue Gate entrance of the Coliseum, and the statue has since been installed there. West's number is retired and a sign hangs over the seating section formerly designated Section 44 (now Section 236, after renovation) with "Jerry West 44" written on it. Hot Rod Hundley's number 33 also is retired and hangs from the walls. On February 29, 2020, the number 44 was retired again in honor of Rod Thorn, who had worn the number immediately after West; Thorn's sign hangs over Section 226.

In 1999-2000, the school was forced to play a year of games split between Wheeling and Charleston, and the gymnasium at nearby Fairmont State University while asbestos was removed from the Coliseum.

In 2004, the Coliseum underwent an upgrade which included renovations to the men's and women's locker rooms, construction of a player's lounge and team video theater, expansion of the equipment and athletic training rooms, refurbishment of the Coliseum roof, and construction of a club seating area in the main arena complete with a private space for concessions, hospitality area, and rest rooms under the lower level seats.

In 2008, the Coliseum received a new video scoreboard, a new public address system, a new lighting system, two LED ribbon boards, and a new floor design. WVU Athletic Director Ed Pastilong also announced the construction of a new $20–$22 million practice facility to be built adjacent to the Coliseum, which was completed in 2012.

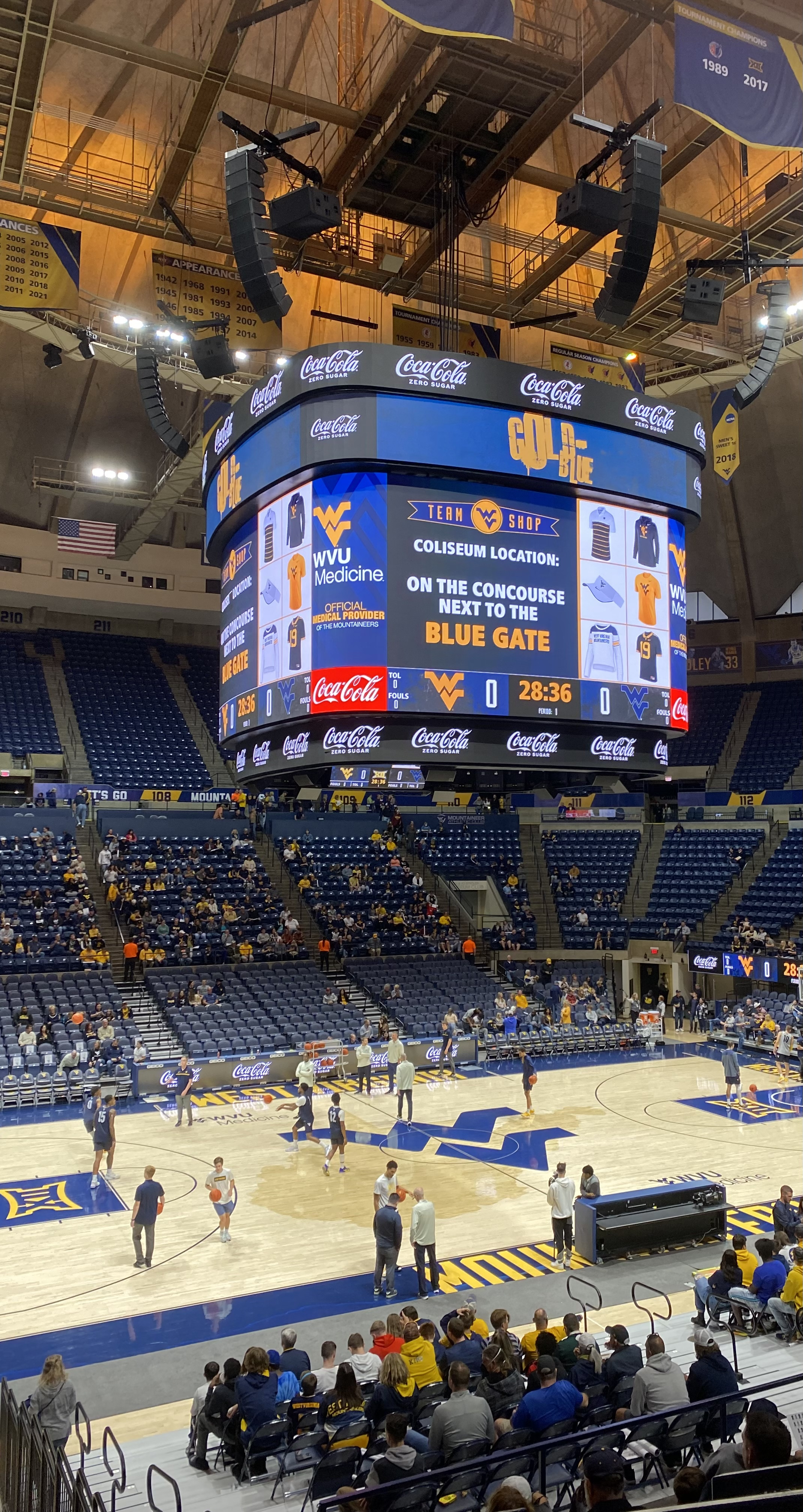
WVU Coliseum interior 2022

In 2016, the concourse area of the Coliseum underwent major renovation to enhance the fan experience, widening the concourse for better traffic flow, adding new concession areas (including self-serve options), and more than doubling the building's restroom capacity.

In 2019, the playing surface was refinished and repainted. The look is the sixth court design in the Coliseum since opening in 1970. The previous court design was installed in 2009, but was repainted in 2012 when West Virginia University changed conferences from the Big East to the Big 12 in 2012. The new court returns to the theme of West Virginia's historic courts with a primarily blue color scheme, and the design coincides with WVU's school-wide Nike rebranding efforts.

New seats were installed in the Coliseum in 2020, replacing the original (1970) seating. The arena also received a new video scoreboard, with a larger display area and higher resolution than the previous scoreboard.

New lighting was installed in December, 2024.

In September, 2025, the naming rights were sold to locally operated Hope Gas, renaming the arena Hope Coliseum.

== Top crowds ==
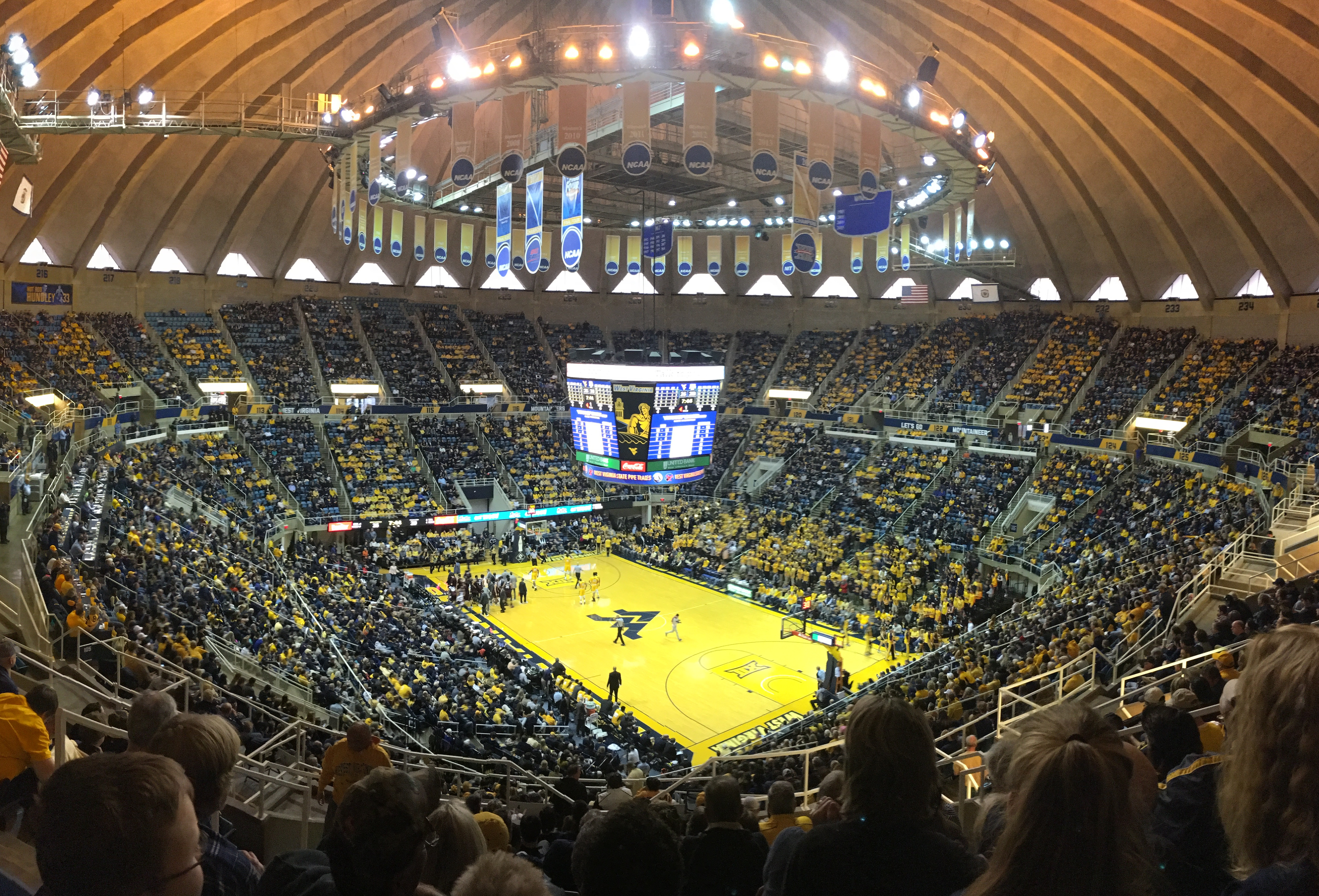
Interior, 2017 during game vs Texas A&M

Highest attendance at Hope Coliseum
Rank	Attendance	Date	Game Result
1	16,704	Feb. 24, 1982	#6 West Virginia 82, Pittsburgh 77
2	15,835	Jan. 27, 2018	#7 West Virginia 76, Kentucky 83
3	15,638	Feb. 27, 1983	West Virginia 87, #1 UNLV 78
4	15,593	Feb. 8, 2010	#5 West Virginia 75, #4 Villanova 82
5	15,419	Feb. 3, 2010	#6 West Virginia 77, #21 Pittsburgh 51
6	15,409	Dec. 4, 1982	West Virginia 95, Marshall 82
7	15,299	Jan. 31, 1981	West Virginia 76, Pittsburgh 63
8	15,289	Feb. 20, 2016	#10 West Virginia 61, #3 Oklahoma 50
9	15,271	Jan. 16, 2010	#9 West Virginia 71, #5 Syracuse 72
10	15,193	Dec. 2, 1995	West Virginia 83, #6 Georgetown 86 (OT)
11	15,167	Feb. 11, 1998	#16 West Virginia 80, #6 UConn 62
12	15,118	Feb. 17 1979	West Virginia 54, #3 Notre Dame 70
13	15,106	Jan. 6, 2018	#6 West Virginia 89, #7 Oklahoma 76
14	15,033	Jan. 23, 2010	#11 West Virginia 71, #21 Ohio State 65
15	15,032	Mar. 5, 2011	West Virginia 72, #11 Louisville 70

== Home Court Advantage ==
WVU men's and women's basketball teams have combined to win over 70% of their home contests throughout the history of Hope Coliseum

== Year by year results ==
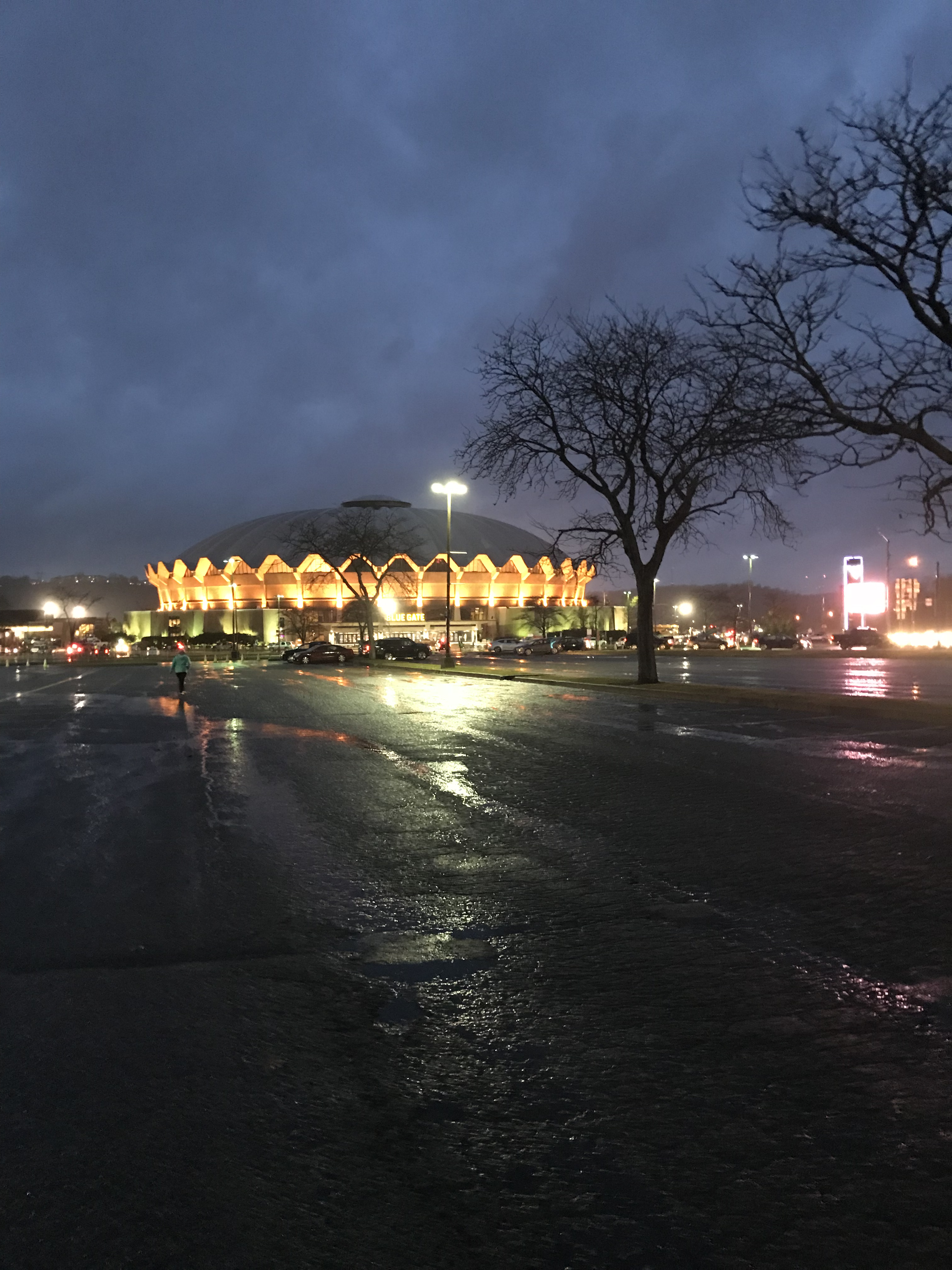
Hope Coliseum

- West Virginia Men's Basketball season results in the Coliseum

Year	Record	Win Percentage
1970-71	9-4	.692
1971-72	11-4	.733
1972-73	8-6	.571
1973-74	8-4	.667
1974-75	8-6	.571
1975-76	12-4	.750
1976-77	11-1	.917
1977-78	8-4	.667
1978-79	14-4	.778
1979-80	8-7	.554
1980-81	19-1	.950
1981-82	15-0	1.000
1982-83	13-1	.929
1983-84	15-2	.882
1984-85	13-3	.813
1985-86	14-2	.875
1986-87	10-6	.625
1988-89	12-2	.857
1989-90	12-1	.923
1990-91	13-2	.867
1991-92	10-3	.769
1992-93	14-1	.933
1993-94	13-3	.813
1994-95	9-4	.692
1995-96	9-5	.643
1996-97	12-4	.750
1997-98	13-1	.929
1998-99	6-7	.462
1999-00	Closed for Asbestos Removal	
2000-01	12-4	.750
2001-02	5-8	.385
2002-03	9-5	.643
2003-04	10-4	.714
2004-05	11-3	.786
2005-06	13-2	.867
2006-07	17-1	.944
2007-08	14-2	.875
2008-09	11-2	.846
2009-10	12-2	.857
2010-11	12-2	.857
2011-12	11-5	.688
2012-13	8-6	.571
2013-14	11-5	.688
2014-15	12-3	.800
2015-16	13-2	.867
2016-17	16-2	.889
2017-18	14-3	.823
2018-19	10-6	.625
2019-20	14-2	.875
2020-21	8-5	.615
2021-22	12-5	.706
2022-23	13-4	.765
2023-24	9-9	.500
2024-25	13-4	.765

OVERALL: 606–188 (.763)

== See also ==
- List of NCAA Division I basketball arenas
