= Morgantown, West Virginia =

City in West Virginia, US

- City
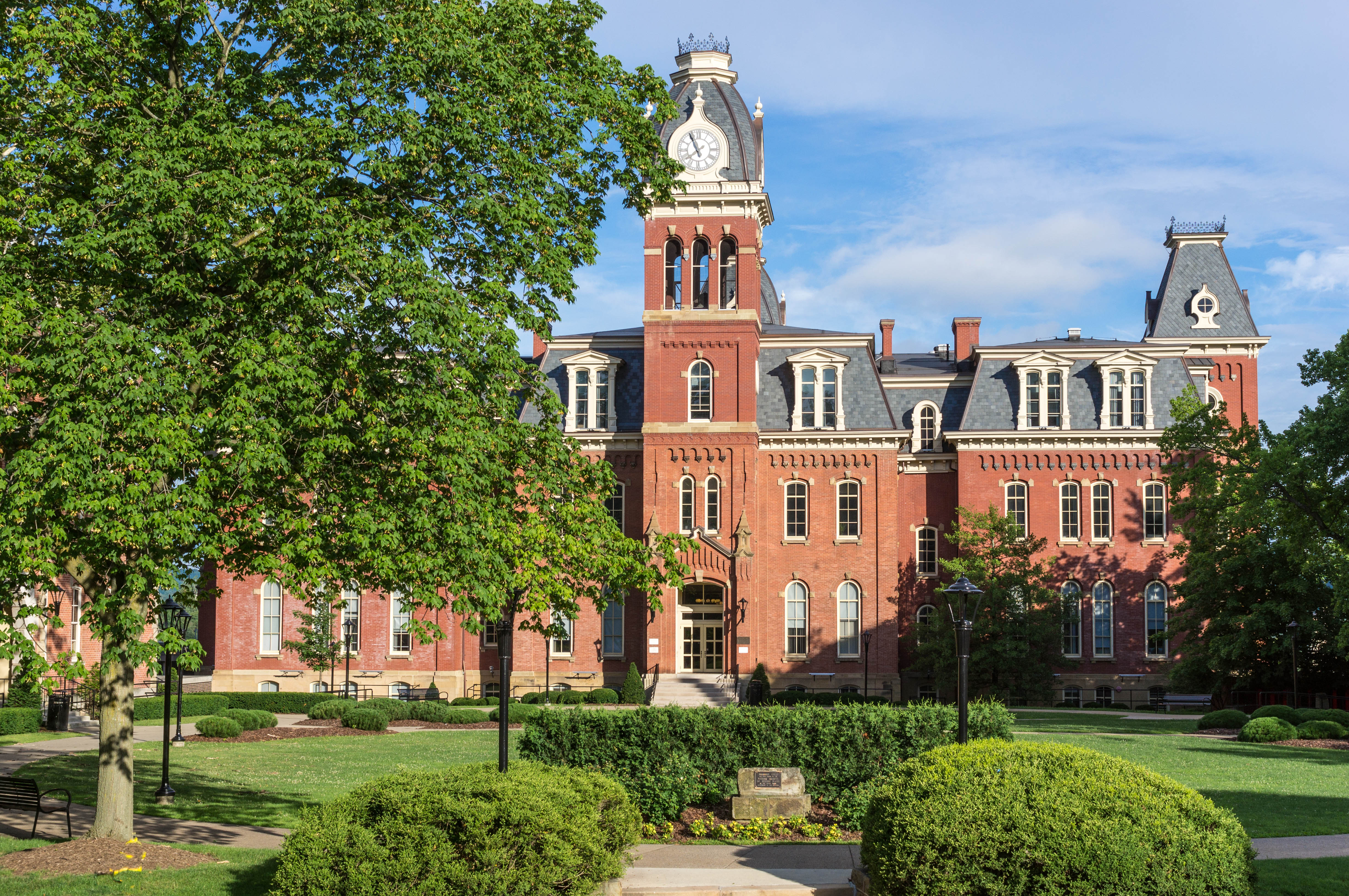
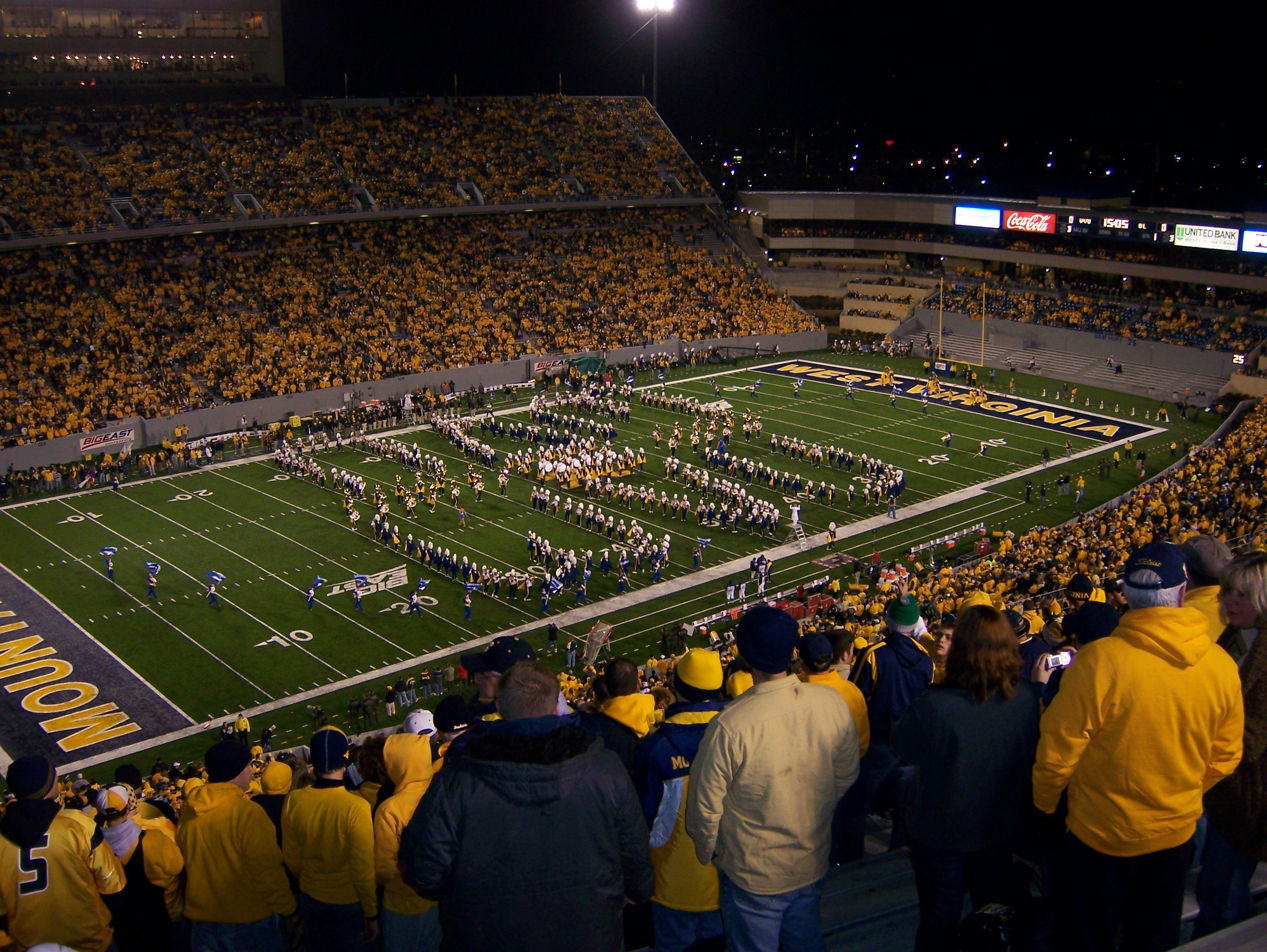
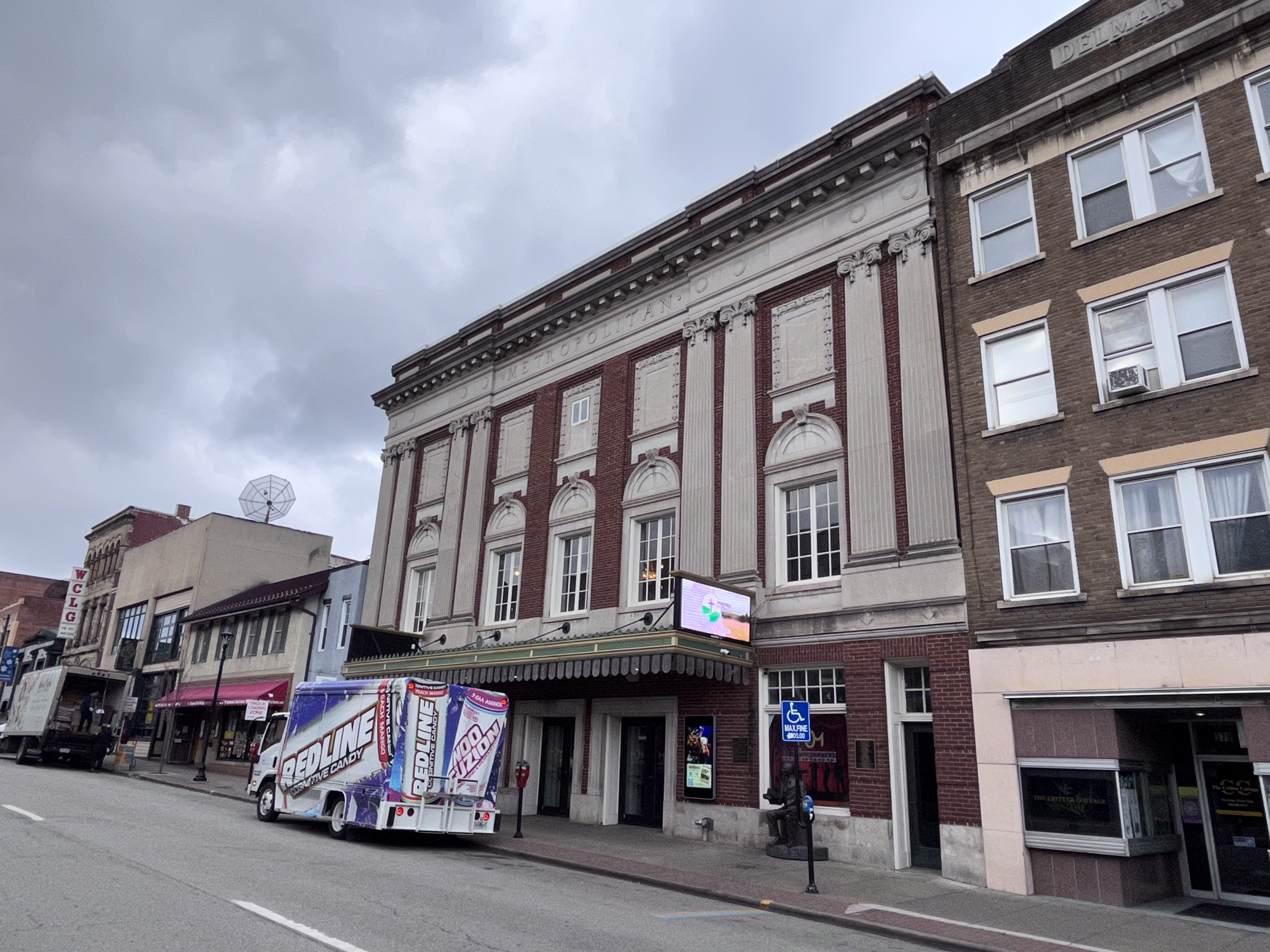
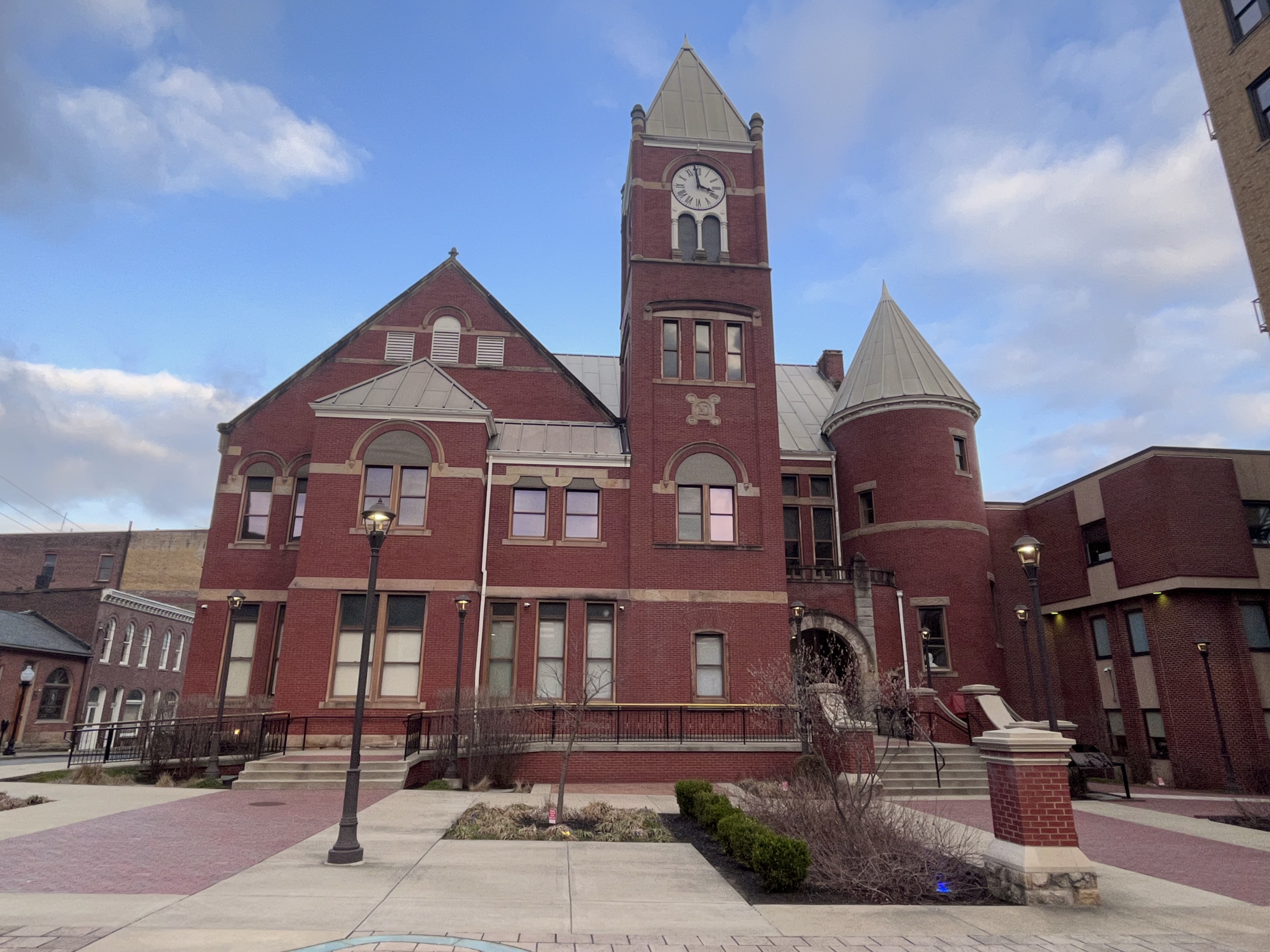
- Downtown Morgantown West Virginia University Milan Puskar Stadium Metropolitan Theatre Monongalia County Courthouse

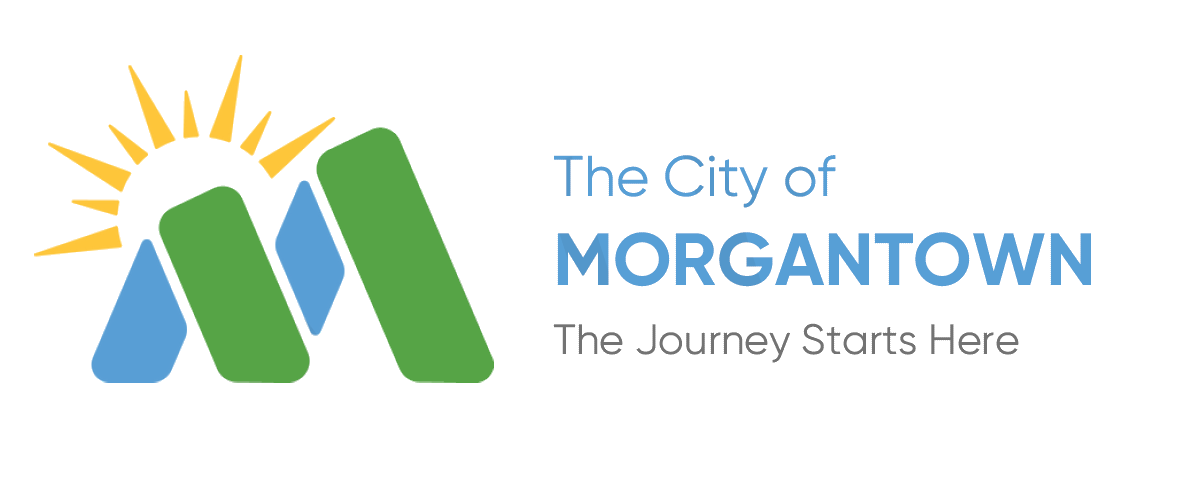
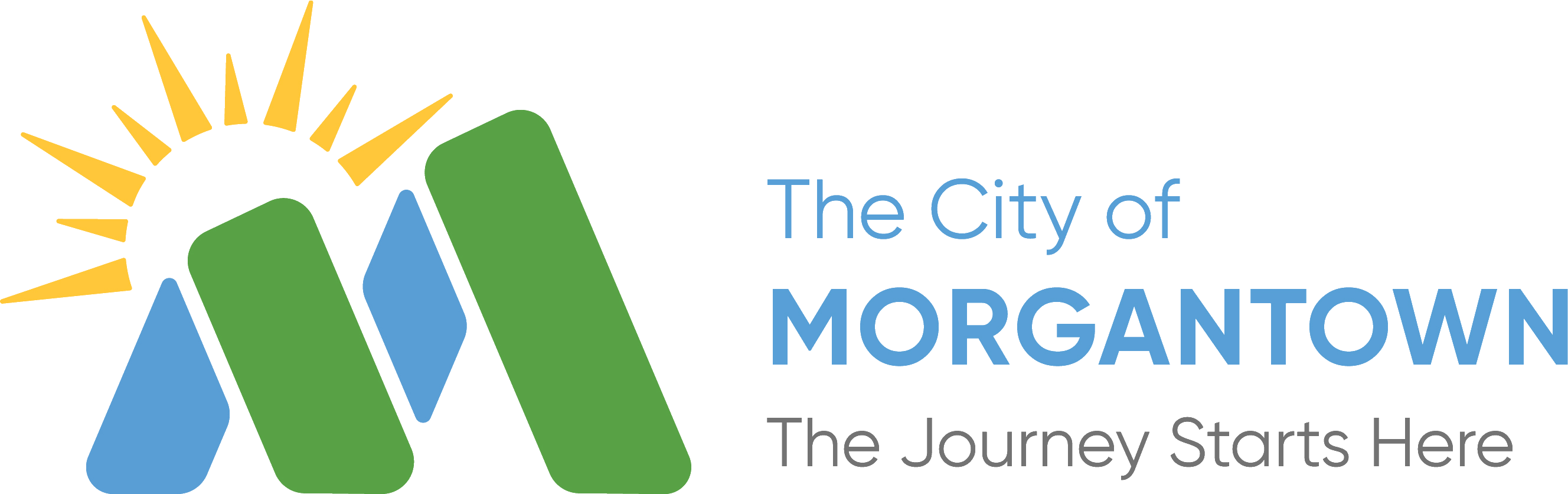
- Flag Seal Coat of arms Wordmark
- Motto(s): (Latin) Regina Monongahelae—Vestigia Nulla Retrorsum; (English) "There is nothing left for the Queen of the Monongahela to return to"
- Interactive map of Morgantown, West Virginia
- Location within West Virginia Location within the United States
- Coordinates: 39°38′1″N 79°57′2″W
- Country: United States
- State: West Virginia
- County: Monongalia
- Settled: 1772
- Chartered: 1785
- Incorporated: 1838
- Founder: Zackquill Morgan
- Named for: Zackquill Morgan

Government
  - Type: Council–manager
  - City Manager: Jamie Miller
  - Mayor: Danielle Trumble

Area
  - City: 10.64 sq mi (27.55 km^{2})
  - Land: 10.19 sq mi (26.40 km^{2})
  - Water: 0.45 sq mi (1.16 km^{2}) 4.24%
- Elevation: 1,161 ft (354 m)

Population (2020)
  - City: 30,347
  - Density: 2,997.3/sq mi (1,157.25/km^{2})
  - Urban: 77,620 (US: 366th)
  - Metro: 140,038 (US: 300th)
- Time zone: UTC−5 (EST)
  - Summer (DST): UTC−4 (EDT)
- ZIP codes: 26501, 26505, 26508
- Area code: 304, 681
- FIPS code: 54-55756
- GNIS feature ID: 1555161
- Website: www.morgantownwv.gov

Morgantown is a city and the county seat of Monongalia County, West Virginia, United States. It lies along the Monongahela River near the state border with Pennsylvania. With a population of 30,347 at the 2020 census, Morgantown is the third-most populous city in West Virginia. The city is a principal center of north-central West Virginia and anchors the broader Morgantown metropolitan area, which has an estimated population of 140,000. Morgantown is home to West Virginia University, the state's flagship public research university.

Founded in 1785 by Zackquill Morgan, for whom it is named, Morgantown developed during the 19th century as a regional trading and transportation hub before emerging as a college town in the 20th century. West Virginia University and its Robert C. Byrd Health Sciences Center have played a central role in shaping the city's economy and demographics. Morgantown is also known for attractions such as the Core Arboretum and for the Morgantown Personal Rapid Transit system, one of the few automated people mover systems in the United States.

== History ==
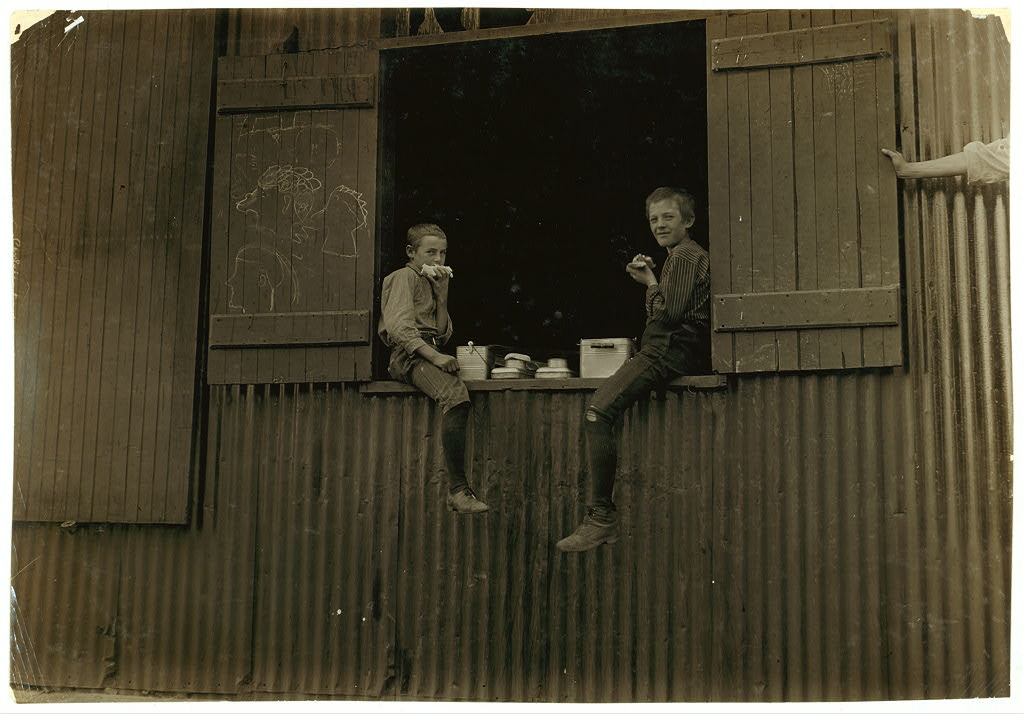
Lunchtime for two boys employed at the Economy Glass Works in Morgantown, 1908. Photo by Lewis Hine.

Morgantown's history is closely tied to the Anglo-French struggle for this territory. Until the Treaty of Paris in 1763, what is now known as Morgantown was greatly contested by white settlers and Native Americans, and by British and French soldiers. The treaty decided the issue in favor of the British, but Indian fighting continued almost to the beginning of the American Revolutionary War in 1775.

Zackquill Morgan and David Morgan, sons of Morgan Morgan, entered the area of Virginia that would become Morgantown around 1767, although others, such as Thomas Decker, were recorded as attempting to settle in the area a decade earlier. Zackquill and David lived here for a few years and eventually built Fort Morgan in present-day Downtown Morgantown in 1772. Several forts were built in the area during this time: Fort Pierpont near the Cheat River, in 1769; Fort Coburn, near Dorsey's Knob, in 1770. Fort Morgan, at the present site of Morgantown, in 1772; Fort Dinwiddie, north several miles at Stewartstown, in 1772; Fort Martin, several miles north on the Monongahela River, in 1773; Fort Burris in the present-day Suncrest area of Morgantown, in 1774; and Fort Kern in the present-day Greenmont area of Morgantown, in 1774, in addition to other, smaller forts.

Zackquill Morgan settled the area about 1772 by establishing a homestead near present-day Fayette Street and University Avenue. Morgan fought in both the French and Indian War and the American Revolutionary War, rising to the rank of colonel. By 1783, following his wartime duties, Colonel Morgan commissioned Major William Haymond to survey his land and divide it into streets and lots. Colonel Morgan then received a legal certificate for 400 acres (160 hectares) in the area of his settlement near the mouth of Decker's Creek. Fifty acres (20 hectares) were appropriated for Morgan's Town by the Virginia General Assembly in October 1785. Notable early structures still standing in Morgantown, include the Old Stone House, built in 1795 by Jacob Nuce on Long Alley (the modern-day Chestnut Street) and the John Rogers family home on Foundry Street, built in 1840 and occupied as of 2011 by the Dering Funeral Home.

On February 3, 1838, the Virginia General Assembly enacted a municipal charter incorporating the city, now with a population of about 700, as Morgantown, Virginia. The town became part of the newly created state of West Virginia on June 20, 1863, through the Reorganized Government of Virginia.

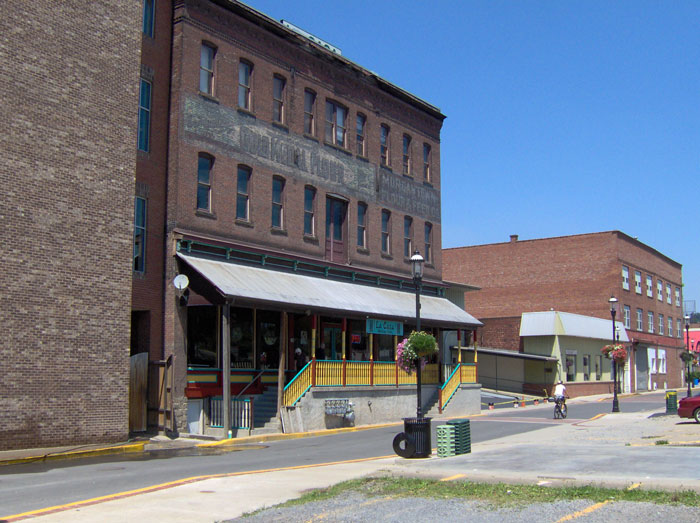
Historic warehouse in Wharf District, converted to restaurant during late-1990s/early-2000s riverfront refurbishing

While informal schools existed from Morgantown's earliest days, formal education began in July 1803 with a one-story, coeducational Virginia common school supported by tuition. In 1814, the Virginia General Assembly incorporated Monongalia Academy, the county's first public school and a male-only institution roughly equivalent to a modern high school, funded by mandatory surveyors' fees. The Academy moved to a new two-story building in 1830 and expanded its curriculum; under Presbyterian minister James Robertson Moore, it reached its peak between 1852 and 1864, enrolling students from 14 states. Parallel developments included the establishment of the Morgantown Female Academy in 1831 (later renamed the Methodist Academy) and the Presbyterian-affiliated Woodburn Female Seminary, both of which closed during the Civil War era, with their assets eventually donated toward the founding of West Virginia University.

After statehood in 1863, West Virginia created a public-school system that nominally provided education for African-American children but in practice enforced a segregated, unequal structure, with white students attending regular terms and Black students limited to short terms at St. Paul's African Methodist Episcopal Church. In the late 19th and early 20th centuries, Morgantown was also home to educational reformer Alexander Wade, whose work on graded rural schooling influenced public education nationwide.

During the 1970s, the U.S. Department of Transportation built an experimental driverless personal rapid transit system in the city, citing the area's variable seasonal climate and geographic elevations as factors in testing the technology's viability. The Morgantown Personal Rapid Transit (PRT) has been in use since 1975. University students use the system for travel between the campuses.

In the 21st century, Morgantown is economically driven mainly by West Virginia University and by the Robert C. Byrd Health Sciences Center. It is a sprawling small city, with townhouses, shopping centers and office buildings that have replaced acres of woods.

== Geography ==
Morgantown is 75 miles (121 km) south of Pittsburgh, Pennsylvania, 208 mi (335 km) west-northwest of Washington, D.C., 81 mi (130 km) east of Marietta, Ohio, and 156 mi (251 km) northeast of Charleston. Morgantown is just south of the Mason–Dixon line.

According to the United States Census Bureau, the city has a total area of 10.62 square miles (27.51 km^{2}), of which 10.17 square miles (26.34 km^{2}) is land and 0.45 square miles (1.17 km^{2}) is water.

=== Neighborhoods ===
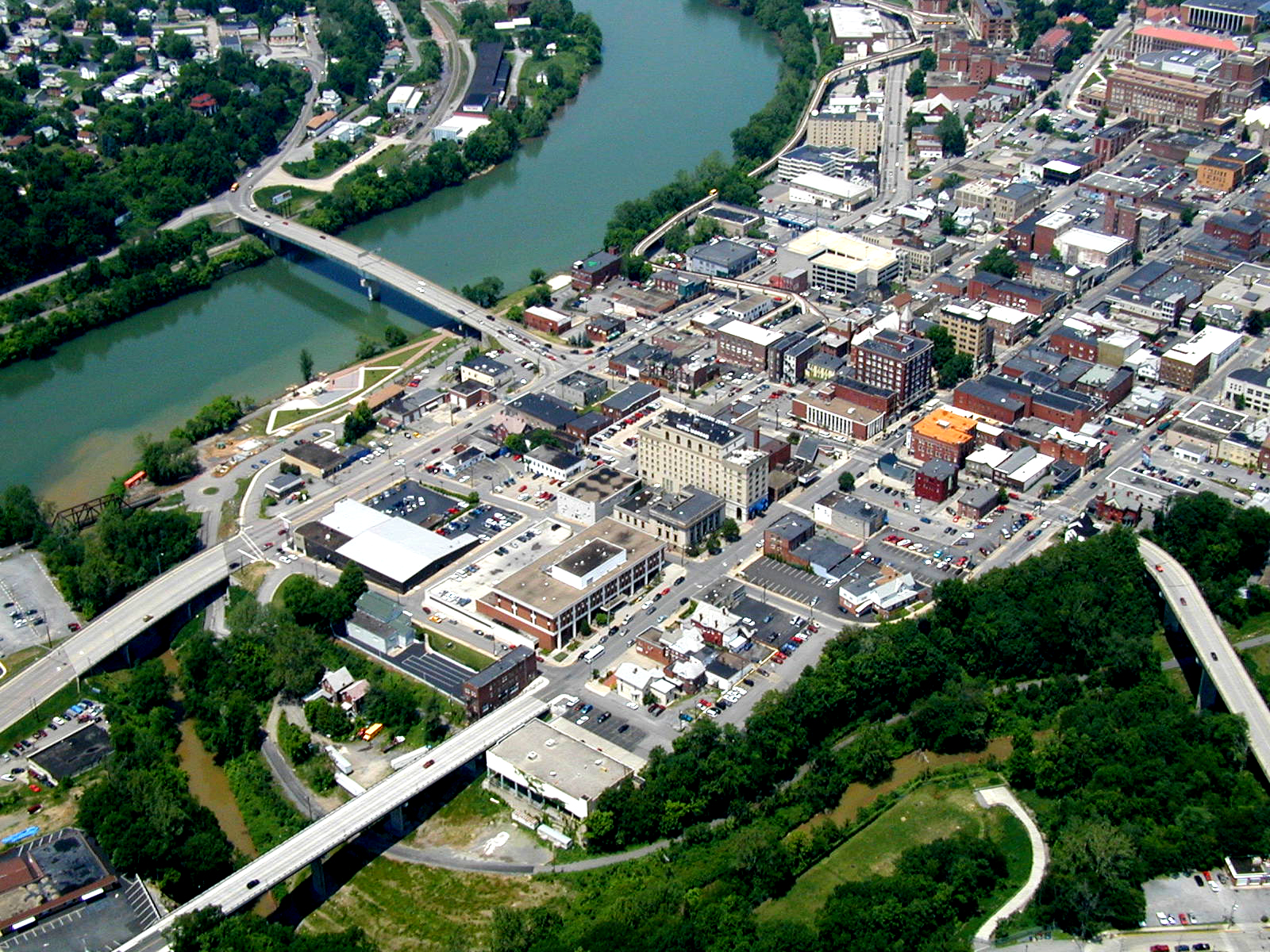
Aerial view of downtown Morgantown

Morgantown is made up of several neighborhoods, some of which had been independent towns that were annexed by the city as it continued to grow. Neighborhoods include First Ward, Woodburn, South Park, Jerome Park, South Hills, Second Ward, Greenmont, Suncrest, Evansdale, Wiles Hill, Sunnyside, Sabraton, the Mileground, and North Hills. While some of these, such as the Mileground, Easton, and Sabraton, are in part or entirely outside the city limits, they are still considered part of Morgantown. The City of Morgantown contained just over 30,000 permanent residents in 2020. The city is host to about 30,000 students at West Virginia University.

Sunnyside, just north of downtown Morgantown, is an older neighborhood adjacent to West Virginia University's downtown campus. The neighborhood is bounded by University Avenue to the east and Campus Drive to the south. Close to the downtown campus of West Virginia University and for decades known as a neighborhood of student housing, is also the scene of many off-campus parties and post-game celebrations including, until 1995, the unsanctioned annual back-to-school block party that would annually draw upward of 10,000 revelers to celebrate the start of fall classes. The university and city put an end to the tradition that year after two students were shot the previous year. The City of Morgantown and West Virginia University jointly established the Sunnyside Up Project: Campus Neighborhoods Revitalization Corporation, dedicated to the redevelopment of this area. The first step was to create a comprehensive revitalization plan, which was published in fall 2004. The university's Summit Hall Dormitory and the Honors Hall Dormitory are in the southern part of the neighborhood.

Woodburn used to be farmland on the hills to the east of downtown Morgantown. The area saw a rapid growth in population at the beginning of the 20th century as home to tinsmiths from Wales who came to work in the tinplate mill that later became the Sterling Faucet Company plant in Sabraton. A trolley line ran the length of Richwood Avenue and originally connected downtown with Sabraton. The Welsh community was active in the Methodist Church at the intersection of High Street and Willey Street, and held picnics in Whitemoore Park, the main green space in Woodburn. Many of these immigrants retained the Welsh language, and as late as the 1930s it was common to hear Welsh spoken on the streets of Woodburn and the community was known for carrying on a traditional eisteddfod every year.

Located in southeastern Morgantown, Sabraton is a former coal town and was previously known as Sturgiss City and Sabraton Station. The community was named after Sabra Vance Sturgiss, the wife of a local judge. Part of Sabraton was home to a tin plate mill, which later become a manufacturing plant for Sterling Faucet. In its early days, Sabraton was connected to downtown Morgantown by a trolley line that ran the length of Richwood Avenue. Its amenities include Marilla Park.

=== Terrain ===
Morgantown lies in the Appalachian Region. The city is hilly with several sections rising over 1,200 feet (370 m) in elevation. The highest point is 1,398 feet (426 m) on Sky Rock in Dorsey Knob Park. The lowest point is on the banks of the Monongahela River at 800 feet (240 m). The area surrounding Morgantown is mountainous. Coopers Rock State Forest, 12 miles (19 km) east of Morgantown, has elevations between 2,000 feet (610 m) and 2,400 feet (730 m) above sea level.

=== Climate ===
Morgantown lies on the border between a humid subtropical climate (Köppen Cfa) and a humid continental climate (Köppen Dfa/Dfb), with four distinct seasons. Winters are cool to cold with a January daily mean temperature of 32.0 °F (0.0 °C), an average annual snowfall of 27.6 inches (70 cm) and 1.3 nights of sub-0 °F (−18 °C) readings. Summers are hot and humid with a July daily mean temperature of 74.1 °F (23.4 °C) and 13.2 days of 90 °F (32 °C)+ highs annually. Precipitation is generous, with winter the driest period and May through July the wettest. Extreme temperatures range from −25 °F (−32 °C) on February 10, 1899, up to 105 °F (41 °C) on August 26, 1893.

Climate data for Morgantown, West Virginia (Morgantown Municipal Airport), 1991–2020 normals, (Note: Mean monthly maxima and minima (i.e. the expected highest and lowest temperature readings at any point during the year or given month) calculated based on data at said location from 1991 to 2020.) extremes 1872–present (Note: Records kept intermittently from May 1872 to December 1892 and more regularly at Morgantown Municipal Airport since November 1945, although the National Weather Service had ceased measuring snowfall at this location in December 1999. See ThreadEx for coverage details.)
Month	Jan	Feb	Mar	Apr	May	Jun	Jul	Aug	Sep	Oct	Nov	Dec	Year
Record high °F (°C)	79 (26)	80 (27)	87 (31)	93 (34)	95 (35)	99 (37)	103 (39)	105 (41)	102 (39)	94 (34)	83 (28)	77 (25)	105 (41)
Mean maximum °F (°C)	65.7 (18.7)	67.0 (19.4)	75.4 (24.1)	83.5 (28.6)	88.0 (31.1)	90.8 (32.7)	92.5 (33.6)	91.4 (33.0)	89.2 (31.8)	82.3 (27.9)	74.7 (23.7)	66.1 (18.9)	93.3 (34.1)
Mean daily maximum °F (°C)	40.1 (4.5)	43.7 (6.5)	52.6 (11.4)	65.2 (18.4)	73.6 (23.1)	80.9 (27.2)	84.4 (29.1)	83.1 (28.4)	77.1 (25.1)	65.9 (18.8)	54.1 (12.3)	44.3 (6.8)	63.8 (17.7)
Daily mean °F (°C)	32.0 (0.0)	34.8 (1.6)	42.6 (5.9)	53.8 (12.1)	62.6 (17.0)	70.3 (21.3)	74.1 (23.4)	72.8 (22.7)	66.5 (19.2)	55.3 (12.9)	44.9 (7.2)	36.4 (2.4)	53.8 (12.1)
Mean daily minimum °F (°C)	24.0 (−4.4)	25.8 (−3.4)	32.6 (0.3)	42.4 (5.8)	51.5 (10.8)	59.7 (15.4)	63.8 (17.7)	62.5 (16.9)	55.9 (13.3)	44.7 (7.1)	35.8 (2.1)	28.6 (−1.9)	43.9 (6.6)
Mean minimum °F (°C)	2.6 (−16.3)	7.0 (−13.9)	13.8 (−10.1)	26.1 (−3.3)	35.5 (1.9)	45.3 (7.4)	52.7 (11.5)	51.9 (11.1)	41.9 (5.5)	29.9 (−1.2)	19.8 (−6.8)	11.6 (−11.3)	0.3 (−17.6)
Record low °F (°C)	−20 (−29)	−25 (−32)	−4 (−20)	6 (−14)	25 (−4)	30 (−1)	40 (4)	38 (3)	30 (−1)	15 (−9)	−1 (−18)	−16 (−27)	−25 (−32)
Average precipitation inches (mm)	3.12 (79)	2.81 (71)	3.65 (93)	3.87 (98)	4.33 (110)	4.07 (103)	4.93 (125)	3.65 (93)	3.41 (87)	3.09 (78)	3.02 (77)	3.20 (81)	43.15 (1,096)
Average snowfall inches (cm)	9.1 (23)	5.5 (14)	7.0 (18)	1.0 (2.5)	0.0 (0.0)	0.0 (0.0)	0.0 (0.0)	0.0 (0.0)	0.0 (0.0)	0.1 (0.25)	1.1 (2.8)	3.8 (9.7)	27.6 (70)
Average precipitation days (≥ 0.01 in)	15.5	13.0	14.4	14.1	14.7	13.1	12.4	10.5	10.3	11.4	11.7	13.9	155.0
Average snowy days (≥ 0.1 in)	6.1	4.3	3.3	0.3	0.0	0.0	0.0	0.0	0.0	0.2	1.1	3.5	18.8
Source: NOAA (snow 1981–2010)

== Demographics ==
Historical population
Census	Pop.	Note	%±
1860	741		—
1870	797		7.6%
1880	745		−6.5%
1890	1,011		35.7%
1900	1,895		87.4%
1910	9,150		382.8%
1920	12,127		32.5%
1930	16,186		33.5%
1940	16,655		2.9%
1950	25,525		53.3%
1960	22,487		−11.9%
1970	29,431		30.9%
1980	27,605		−6.2%
1990	25,879		−6.3%
2000	26,809		3.6%
2010	29,660		10.6%
2020	30,347		2.3%
2024 (est.)	30,490		0.5%
U.S. Decennial Census

Following the 2010 census, Monongalia County and neighboring Preston County were acknowledged as a metropolitan statistical area (MSA) by the United States government.

West Virginia University constitutes 913 acres (369 hectares) of the city and vicinity, and with the fall 2012 enrollment added an additional population of 29,707 students.

According to the Bureau of Labor Statistics, Morgantown had some of the lowest unemployment rates in the United States as of early 2009.

=== 2020 census ===
As of the 2020 census, Morgantown had a population of 30,347. The median age was 23.0 years. 9.8% of residents were under 18, and 9.7% were 65 or older. For every 100 females there were 104.6 males, and for every 100 females age 18 and over there were 104.6 males age 18 and over.

100.0% of residents lived in urban areas, while 0.0% lived in rural areas.

There were 11,867 households in Morgantown, of which 14.7% had children under age 18 living in them. Of all households, 23.7% were married-couple households, 34.6% were households with a male householder and no spouse or partner present, and 34.0% were households with a female householder and no spouse or partner present. About 44.1% of all households were made up of individuals and 9.0% had someone living alone who was 65 years of age or older. The average household and family size was 2.71.

There were 13,877 housing units, of which 14.5% were vacant. The homeowner vacancy rate was 2.6% and the rental vacancy rate was 11.4%.

Racial composition as of the 2020 census
Race	Number	Percent
White	25,170	82.9%
Black or African American	1,403	4.6%
American Indian and Alaska Native	59	0.2%
Asian	1,125	3.7%
Native Hawaiian and Other Pacific Islander	41	0.1%
Some other race	394	1.3%
Two or more races	2,155	7.1%
Hispanic or Latino (of any race)	1,240	4.1%

=== 2010 census ===
As of the 2010 census, 29,660 people, 11,701 households, and 3,827 families resided in the city. The population density was 2,916.4 inhabitants per square mile (1,126.0/km^{2}). There were 12,664 housing units at an average density of 1,245.2 per square mile (480.8/km^{2}). The racial makeup of the city was 89.7% White, 4.1% African American, 0.1% Native American, 3.4% Asian, 0.1% Pacific Islander, 0.6% from other races, and 2.0% from two or more races. Hispanic or Latino of any race were 2.6% of the population.

There were 11,701 households; 12.0% had children under 18 living with them, 23.1% were married couples living together, 6.5% had a female householder with no husband present, 3.1% had a male householder with no wife present, and 67.3% were non-families. 36.6% of all households were made up of individuals, and 7.1% had someone living alone who was 65 years of age or older. The average household size was 2.05 and the average family size was 2.71.

The median age in the city was 22.6 years. 8.2% of residents were under 18; 52.1% were between 18 and 24; 18.4% were from 25 to 44; 13.1% were from 45 to 64; and 8.1% were 65 or older. The gender makeup of the city was 53.5% male and 46.5% female.

=== 2000 census ===
As of the 2000 census, 26,809 people, 10,782 households, and 4,183 families resided in the city. The population density was 2,736.0 people per square mile (1,056.2/km^{2}). There were 11,721 housing units at an average density of 1,196.2 per square mile (461.8/km^{2}). The racial makeup of the city was 89.48% White, 4.15% African American, 0.17% Native American, 4.15% Asian, 0.05% Pacific Islander, 0.51% from other races, and 1.48% from two or more races. Hispanic or Latino of any race were 1.54% of the population.

There were 10,782 households; 15.0% had children under 18 living with them, 29.1% were married couples living together, 7.0% had a female householder with no husband present, and 61.2% were non-families. 37.3% of all households were made up of individuals, and 9.5% had someone living alone who was 65 years of age or older. The average household size was 2.08 and the average family size was 2.76.

Morgantown's age distribution, which is heavily influenced by the presence of West Virginia University, is: 11.1% under the age of 18, 44.7% from 18 to 24, 20.4% from 25 to 44, 13.5% from 45 to 64, and 10.4% who were 65 years of age or older. The median age was 23 years. For every 100 females, there were 104.7 males. For every 100 females age 18 and over, there were 105.0 males.

The median income for a household in the city was $20,649, and the median income for a family was $44,622. Males had a median income of $33,268 versus $24,944 for females. The city's per capita income was $14,459. About 15.0% of families and 38.4% of the population were below the poverty line, including 23.3% of those under age 18 and 8.3% of those age 65 or over.

== Arts and culture ==
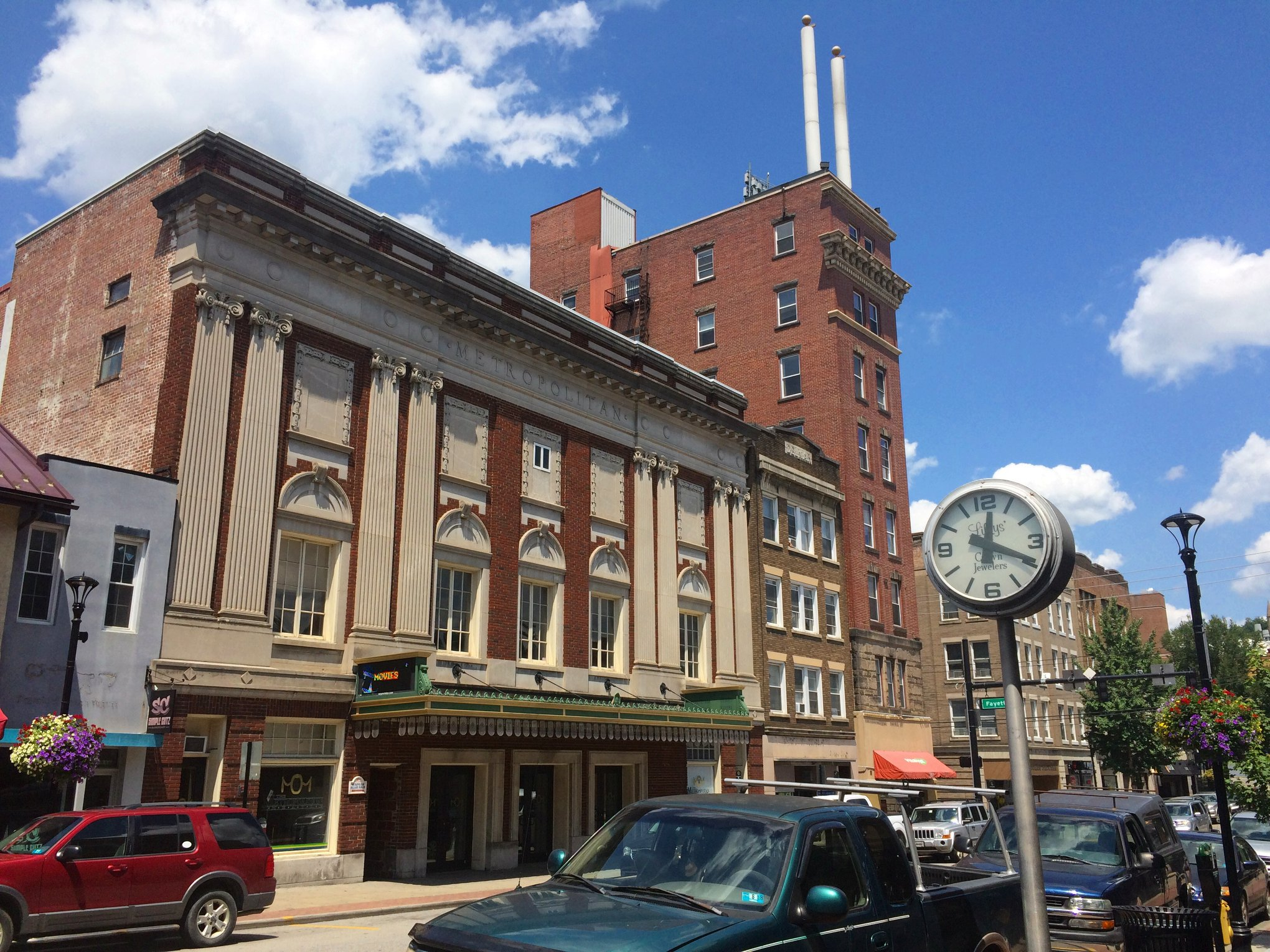
The Metropolitan Theatre in Downtown Morgantown opened in 1924.

Morgantown has a well-established theatrical presence, supported in part by the infrastructure provided by West Virginia University, including the Canady Creative Arts Center and the West Virginia Public Theatre. Additional performance venues in the city include the Metropolitan Theatre and the Monongalia Arts Center. Other museums in the city include the West Virginia University Art Museum and Morgantown History Museum.

== Parks and recreation ==
Core Arboretum is owned by West Virginia University and consists mostly of old-growth forest on a steep hillside and Monongahela River floodplain. It includes densely wooded areas with 3.5 miles (5.6 km) of walking trails, as well as three acres (1.2 hectares) of lawn planted with specimen trees. Dorsey Knob is a mountain at the southern edge of Morgantown that reaches 1,398 feet (426 m) in elevation. Other parks in Morgantown include Hazel Ruby McQuain Riverfront Park and the Caperton and Deckers Creek Rail-Trails.

Athletic centers include Milan Puskar Stadium and Hope Coliseum, the home of the West Virginia Mountaineers football and basketball teams, respectively.

Morgantown is a qualified Tree City USA as recognized by the National Arbor Day Foundation.

== Sports ==
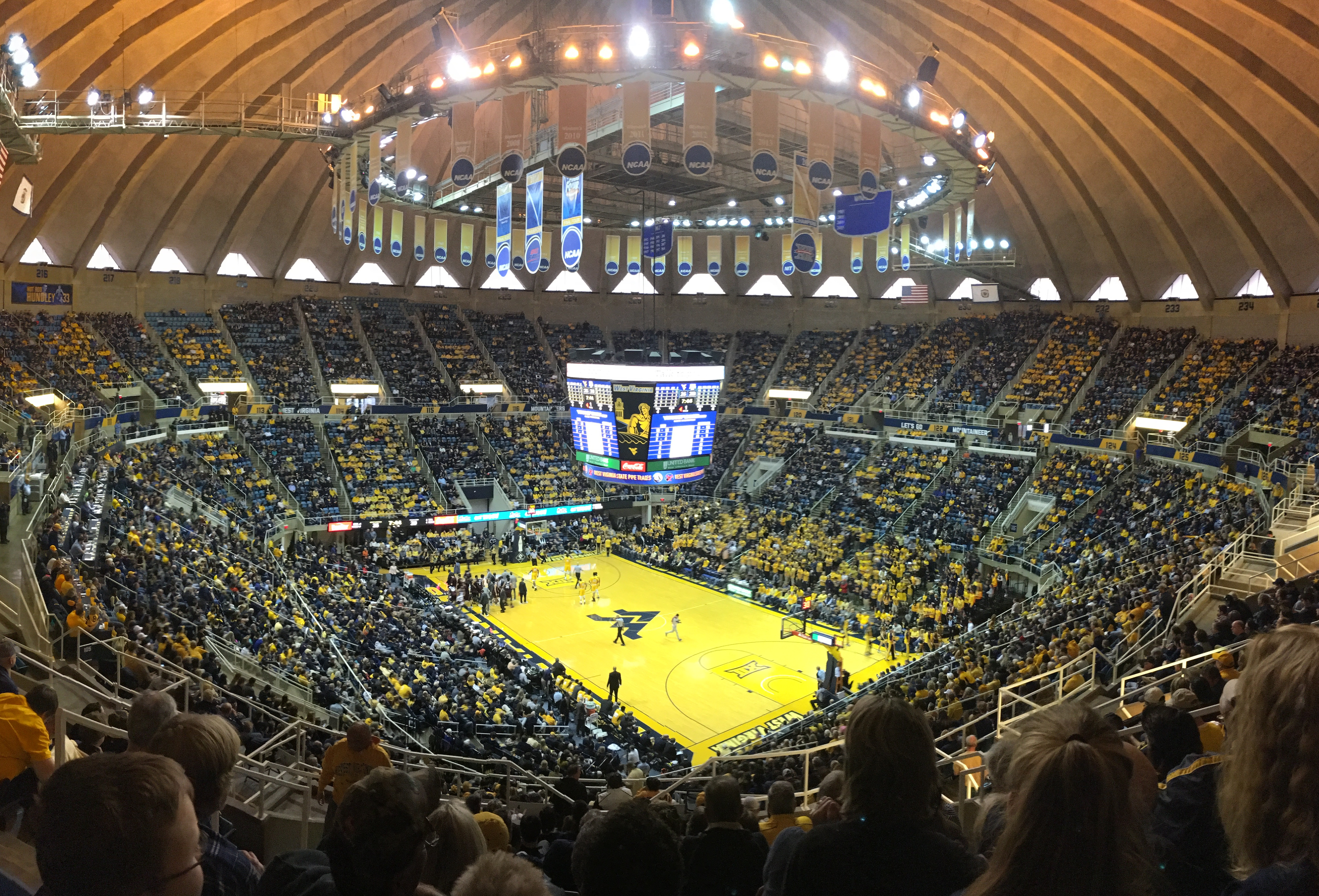
Interior of Hope Coliseum

The West Virginia Black Bears are a collegiate summer baseball team based in Morgantown. The team is part of the MLB Draft League. Games are played at the Kendrick Family Ballpark in nearby Granville.

The inaugural Morgantown Marathon was held in September 2015. The 26.2-mile (42.2 km) course winds through Morgantown's seven wards and is characterized by its elevation changes. Official times from the Morgantown Marathon can be used for Boston Marathon qualification. In addition to the full marathon race, the Morgantown Marathon also includes The Mountain Mama 8k and a half-marathon.

== Education ==
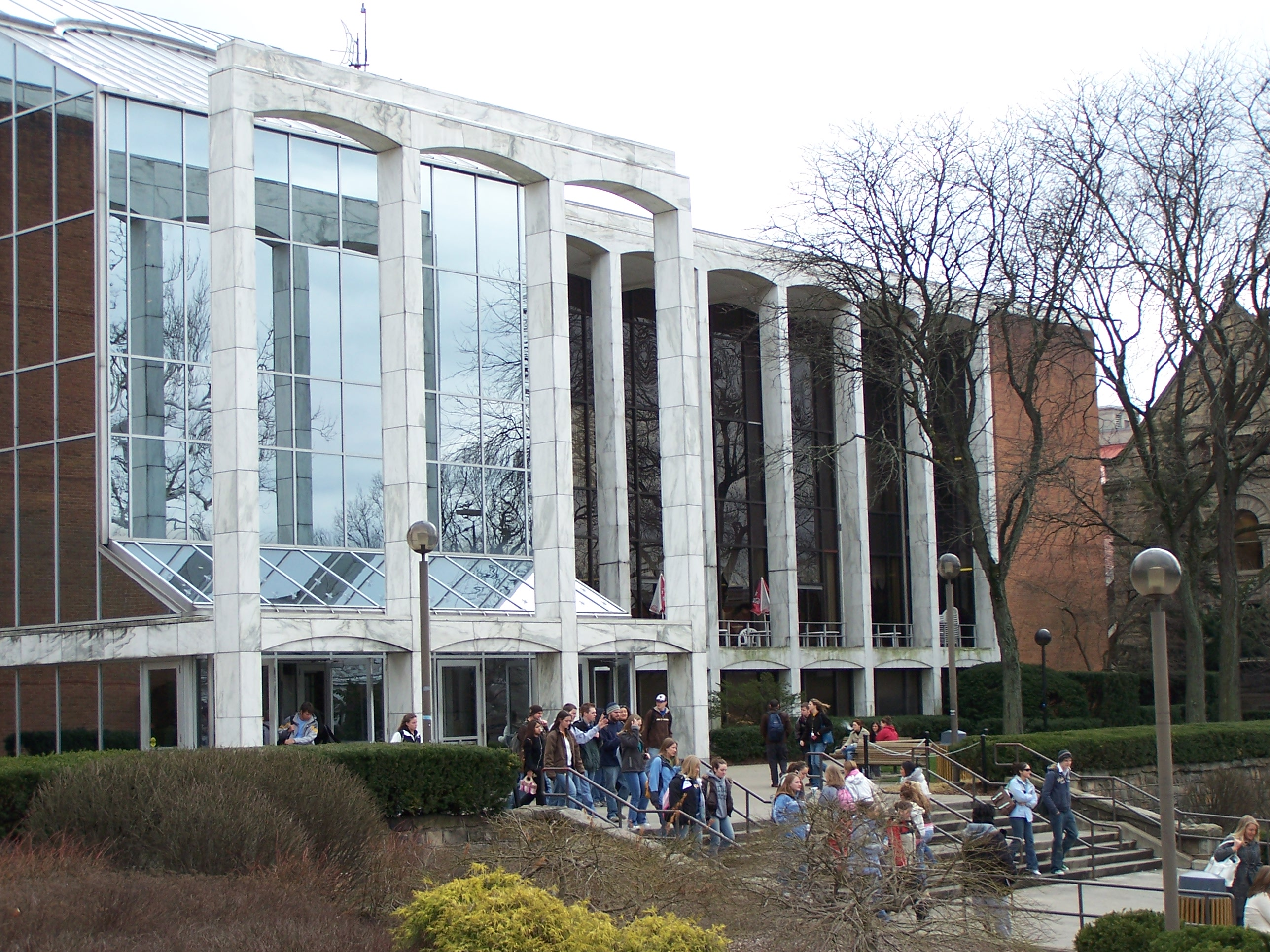
The Mountainlair student union on the West Virginia University campus

West Virginia University is a public land-grant university founded in 1867. As of 2024, it enrolled more than 25,000 students and employed more than 1,200 faculty.

The city is served by Monongalia County Schools. Public elementary schools in Morgantown and its surrounding area include Cheat Lake, North, Brookhaven, Ridgedale, Mountainview, Mylan Park, Skyview, Suncrest Elementary, and Eastwood. There are four middle schools: Mountaineer Middle, South, Westwood, and Suncrest Middle. The city's two high schools are University High School, the mascot of which is the Hawks, and Morgantown High School, whose mascot is the Mohigans. The latter's name is a combination of the words Morgantown (MO) High (HIG) Annual (AN), which was the school's yearbook. The Native American mascot and logo were adopted because of the close relation to the Mohicans.

Private schools include Morgantown Christian Academy, Maranatha Christian Academy, Covenant Christian School, Trinity Christian School, St. Francis Elementary/Middle School, and the alternative, non-religious Morgantown Learning Academy. St. Francis de Sales was founded prior to 1915 as a two-room school on McLane Avenue in the Seneca neighborhood. In October 1915, the pastorate arranged for Ursuline Nuns of the Immaculate Conception from Louisville, Kentucky, and in 1918, under principal Sister M. Isadore, the school moved to a new building on Beechurst Avenue, adjacent to St. Theresa's Church. On June 9, 1990, the grade school moved into the former St. Francis Central High School building, and eventually into newly built facility at 41 Guthrie Lane. St. Francis Central High School existed for several decades on Birch Street in the Evansdale neighborhood until that campus was taken over by the elementary school in 1990. The West Virginia University Foundation purchased its building and land in 2003.

== Media ==
=== Print ===
Morgantown has two newspapers. The Dominion Post is a privately owned newspaper which is published daily. The university-owned, student-run college newspaper, The Daily Athenaeum, is published on weekdays while classes are in session and is provided free of charge on campus and to many businesses around Morgantown.

There are also other local quasi-newspapers such as the Post Extra and the Morgantown Times, which typically feature a few local news stories and an abundance of advertisements. Both are free of charge and mass-mailed throughout the Morgantown area.

=== Television ===
Morgantown is part of the Pittsburgh television market. However, stations in the Clarksburg/Weston/Fairmont market claim Morgantown as part of their primary coverage area. Xfinity and its predecessors have supplemented area cable subscribers with stations from both markets since the 1960s. WNPB, part of West Virginia Public Broadcasting, has studios in Morgantown.

=== Radio ===
Call sign	Frequency	Format	Owner
WPDX	1300 AM	Contemporary Christian	AJG Corporation
WCLG	100.1 FM	Active rock	Bowers Broadcasting Corporation
WAJR	1440 AM	News/Talk	West Virginia Radio Corporation
WVAQ	101.9 FM	Contemporary hit radio	West Virginia Radio Corporation
WWVU-FM	91.7 FM	College radio	West Virginia University Board Of Governors
WGYE	102.7 FM	Conservative talk	LHTC Media of West Virginia, Inc.
WZST	100.9 FM	Adult contemporary	Spectrum Radio Group
WFGM-FM	93.1 FM	Oldies	West Virginia Radio Corporation
WKKW	97.9 FM	Country	West Virginia Radio Corporation
WVPM	90.9 FM	Public radio	West Virginia Educational Broadcasting Authority

== Infrastructure ==
=== Transportation ===
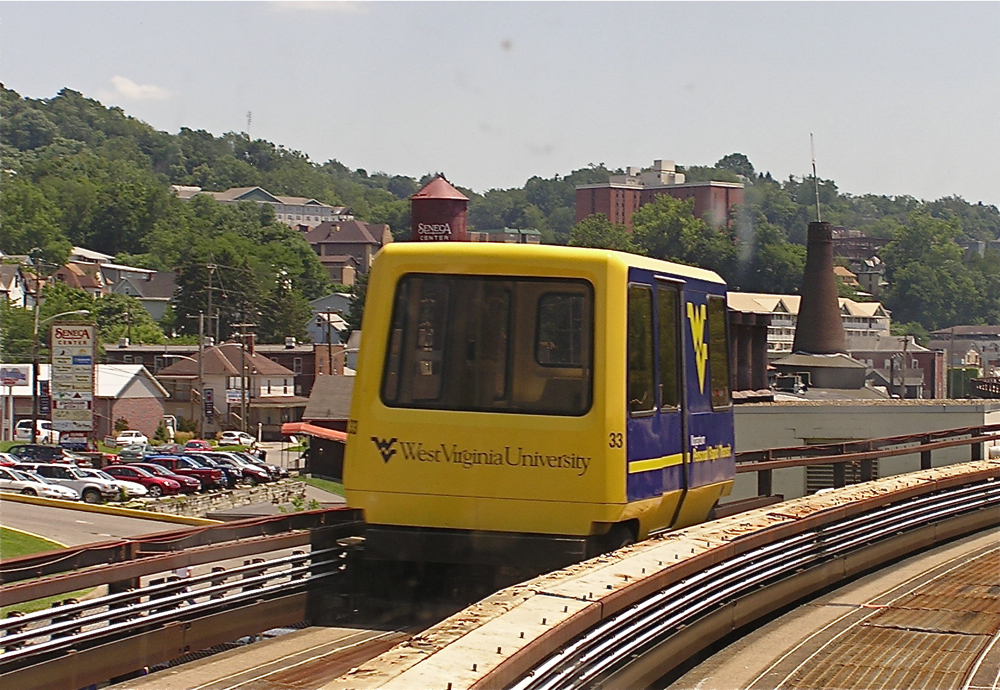
Morgantown Personal Rapid Transit (PRT)

Major roadways in the city include Interstate 79, Interstate 68, U.S. Highway 19, U.S. Highway 119, West Virginia Route 7, and West Virginia Route 705. The West Run Expressway is a proposed route that would bypass the city to the northeast. Most of Morgantown is accessible by the Mountain Line Transit Authority bus system. Most service operates Monday-Saturday from 7 a.m. to 6 p.m. with a very limited service operating on Sunday during the WVU school year. Mountain Line's Grey Line bus operates every day of the year between Clarksburg, West Virginia and Pittsburgh International Airport. Morgantown also has the Morgantown Personal Rapid Transit (PRT) system. The system has five stations (Walnut, Beechurst, Engineering, Towers, and Medical) covering 8.65 miles (13.9 km).

Morgantown Municipal Airport is one of West Virginia's few commercial airports. It is approximately 3 miles (4.8 km) northeast of the downtown along U.S. Route 119. North Central West Virginia Airport is about 35 miles (56 km) away by road, and Pittsburgh International Airport is about 80 miles (130 km) away.

The only active rail line near Morgantown is owned by Norfolk Southern with CSX trackage rights and serves a mine northwest of Rivesville, West Virginia. Coal is the major commodity, with a train serving local chemical industries such as Tanner and Addivant (formerly Chemtura) that require tank cars. These are trucked in and then loaded onto high side gondolas or bulkhead flat cars. Conrail was split by Norfolk Southern and CSX in 1999. CSX pays for half of the cost of maintenance for the line. CSX uses it mostly to bring trains from Grafton to load at Consol's Bailey Mine and for direct access to Pittsburgh.

Morgantown relies heavily on the Monongahela River for shipping coal and other products. The river is fully navigable from its mouth at the Ohio River in Pittsburgh, past Morgantown upstream to Fairmont. The Morgantown Lock and Dam, in the southern part of the city, helps provide a continuous pool heading upstream towards the Hildebrand Lock and Dam. Point Marion Lock and Dam, the next downstream dam, is responsible for most of the river's pool in Morgantown.

=== Utilities ===
Electric service is provided by Mon Power, natural gas services by Dominion Resources (operating as "Hope Gas"), and water and sewage by the Morgantown Utility Board.

Cable television and cable Internet are offered by Comcast Communications. Landline telephone, DSL, and Fiber-optic communication services are offered by Frontier Communications. Fiber internet is also available from Breezeline. West Side Telecommunications telephone and DSL service available in some areas.

Trash pickup in the Morgantown area is provided by Republic Services. The City of Morgantown has adopted a weekly recycling program, as part of the Clean Community Concept, an initiative by the city government.

== Sister cities ==
Morgantown is a sister city of:

- Guanajuato, Mexico

Morgantown established Friendship City relations with Quanshan District, Xuzhou, Jiangsu, China, in 2012.
