= National Register of Historic Places listings in Marshall County, West Virginia =

Location of Marshall County in West Virginia

This is a list of the National Register of Historic Places listings in Marshall County, West Virginia.

This is intended to be a complete list of the properties and districts on the National Register of Historic Places in Marshall County, West Virginia, United States. The locations of National Register properties and districts for which the latitude and longitude coordinates are included below, may be seen in an online map.

There are 13 properties and districts listed on the National Register in the county.

This National Park Service list is complete through NPS recent listings posted December 12, 2025.

Contents: Counties in West Virginia

Barbour - Berkeley - Boone - Braxton - Brooke - Cabell - Calhoun - Clay - Doddridge - Fayette - Gilmer - Grant - Greenbrier - Hampshire - Hancock - Hardy - Harrison - Jackson - Jefferson - Kanawha - Lewis - Lincoln - Logan - Marion - Marshall - Mason - McDowell - Mercer - Mineral - Mingo - Monongalia - Monroe - Morgan - Nicholas - Ohio - Pendleton - Pleasants - Pocahontas - Preston - Putnam - Raleigh - Randolph - Ritchie - Roane - Summers - Taylor - Tucker - Tyler - Upshur - Wayne - Webster - Wetzel - Wirt - Wood - Wyoming

== Current listings ==
	Name on the Register	Image	Date listed	Location	City or town	Description
1	B & O Railroad Viaduct	B & O Railroad Viaduct	June 22, 1976 (#76001370)	Spans the Ohio River at the southern end of Benwood; 40°00′40″N 80°44′13″W	Benwood	Extends into Belmont County, Ohio
2	Cameron City Pool-PWA Project 1196	Cameron City Pool-PWA Project 1196	July 14, 1993 (#93000612)	Park St. 39°49′46″N 80°34′01″W	Cameron	
3	Cameron Downtown	Cameron Downtown	December 4, 1998 (#98001473)	Roughly bounded by Church St., Waynesburg Ave., Main St., and Park St. 39°49′35″N 80°33′57″W	Cameron	
4	Bennett Cockayne House	Bennett Cockayne House	December 12, 2002 (#02001521)	1111 Wheeling Ave. 39°56′33″N 80°45′17″W	Glen Dale	
5	Ferrell-Holt House	Ferrell-Holt House	February 3, 1987 (#86003678)	609 Jefferson Ave. 39°55′08″N 80°44′52″W	Moundsville	
6	Grave Creek Mound	Grave Creek Mound	October 15, 1966 (#66000751)	Off WV 2; 39°55′01″N 80°44′42″W	Moundsville	
7	McMechen Lockmaster Houses on the Ohio River	McMechen Lockmaster Houses on the Ohio River	November 12, 1992 (#92001485)	623-625 Grant St. 39°59′22″N 80°44′03″W	McMechen	
8	Moundsville Commercial Historic District	Moundsville Commercial Historic District	March 17, 1995 (#95000252)	Roughly Jefferson Ave. from 2nd to 7th Sts., 7th from Jefferson to Lafayette Ave., and Lafayette south of 7th 39°55′15″N 80°44′49″W	Moundsville	
9	Prabhupada's Palace of Gold	Prabhupada's Palace of Gold	August 28, 2019 (#100002852)	3759 McCreary’s Ridge Rd. 39°57′43″N 80°36′14″W	Moundsville vicinity	
10	Bushrod Washington Price House	Bushrod Washington Price House	November 22, 1995 (#95001326)	1803 Virginia St. 39°55′22″N 80°43′57″W	Moundsville	
11	Spencer Cemetery	Spencer Cemetery	December 12, 2012 (#12001051)	668 Burley Hill Rd. 39°52′01″N 80°32′15″W	Cameron	
12	West Virginia-Pennsylvania Sinclair Cornerstone	West Virginia-Pennsylvania Sinclair Cornerstone	September 5, 2025 (#100012202)	10 off County Road; 39°43′18″N 80°31′06″W	Georgetown	
13	West Virginia State Penitentiary	West Virginia State Penitentiary	September 19, 1996 (#96000987)	818 Jefferson Ave. 39°54′55″N 80°44′34″W	Moundsville	

== See also ==
- List of National Historic Landmarks in West Virginia
- National Register of Historic Places listings in West Virginia
