= Price House =

Price House may refer to:

- Major Edward Preston Price House, Butler County, Alabama, listed on the Alabama Register of Landmarks and Heritage
- McCullough–Price House, Chandler, Arizona
- W.Y. Price House, Florence, Arizona, listed on the National Register of Historic Places (NRHP)
- Wynn-Price House, Garland, Arkansas
- Acacia Lodge, Montecito, California, also known as the Shourds-Price House
- John Price House, Pismo Beach, California
- Dr. Price House, Live Oak, Florida
- William Price House, Columbus, Georgia, formerly listed on the NRHP
- Dan Price House, Paris, Idaho, listed on the NRHP
- Fred Price House, Paris, Idaho, listed on the NRHP
- Herber Price House, Paris, Idaho, listed on the NRHP
- Joe Price House, Paris, Idaho, listed on the NRHP
- Robert Price House, Paris, Idaho, listed on the NRHP
- Dr. A.D. Price House, Harrodsburg, Kentucky, listed on the NRHP
- Pugh Price House, Lexington, Kentucky, listed on the NRHP
- Williamson Price House, Lexington, Kentucky, listed on the NRHP
- Brown-Price House, Lansing, Michigan, listed on the NRHP
- Price-Crawford House, Lafayette County, Mississippi, a Mississippi Landmark
- Benjamin Price House, Elizabeth, New Jersey
- Price–Brittan House, Elizabeth, New Jersey
- Hillside (Greensboro, North Carolina), also known as the Julian Price House
- Jonathan Price House, Clinton, Ohio
- O.L. Price House, Portland, Oregon, listed on the NRHP
- Piper-Price House, Philadelphia, Pennsylvania
- Joseph Price House, West Whiteland Township, Pennsylvania
- George R. Price House, Columbia, South Carolina
- Raymond Price House, Columbia, South Carolina
- Price's Post Office, Spartanburg County, South Carolina, also known as the Price House
- Dr. Thomas H. Price House, Covington, Tennessee, listed on the NRHP
- McClendon-Price House, Austin, Texas, a Recorded Texas Historic Landmark
- R. H. and Martha Price House, Georgetown, Texas, listed on the NRHP
- Cates-Price House, Palacios, Texas, a Recorded Texas Historic Landmark
- Price-Farwell House, Palacios, Texas, listed on the NRHP
- John and Margaret Price House, Salt Lake City, Utah, listed on the NRHP
- Lorenzo and Emma Price House and Barn, Salt Lake City, Utah, listed on the NRHP
- Governor Samuel Price House, Lewisburg, West Virginia
- D.I.B. Anderson Farm, Morgantown, West Virginia, also known as the Chauncey M. Price House
- Bushrod Washington Price House, Moundsville, West Virginia
- R. T. Price House, Williamson, West Virginia
