= Bennett Cockayne House =

Historic house in West Virginia, United States

- U.S. National Register of Historic Places
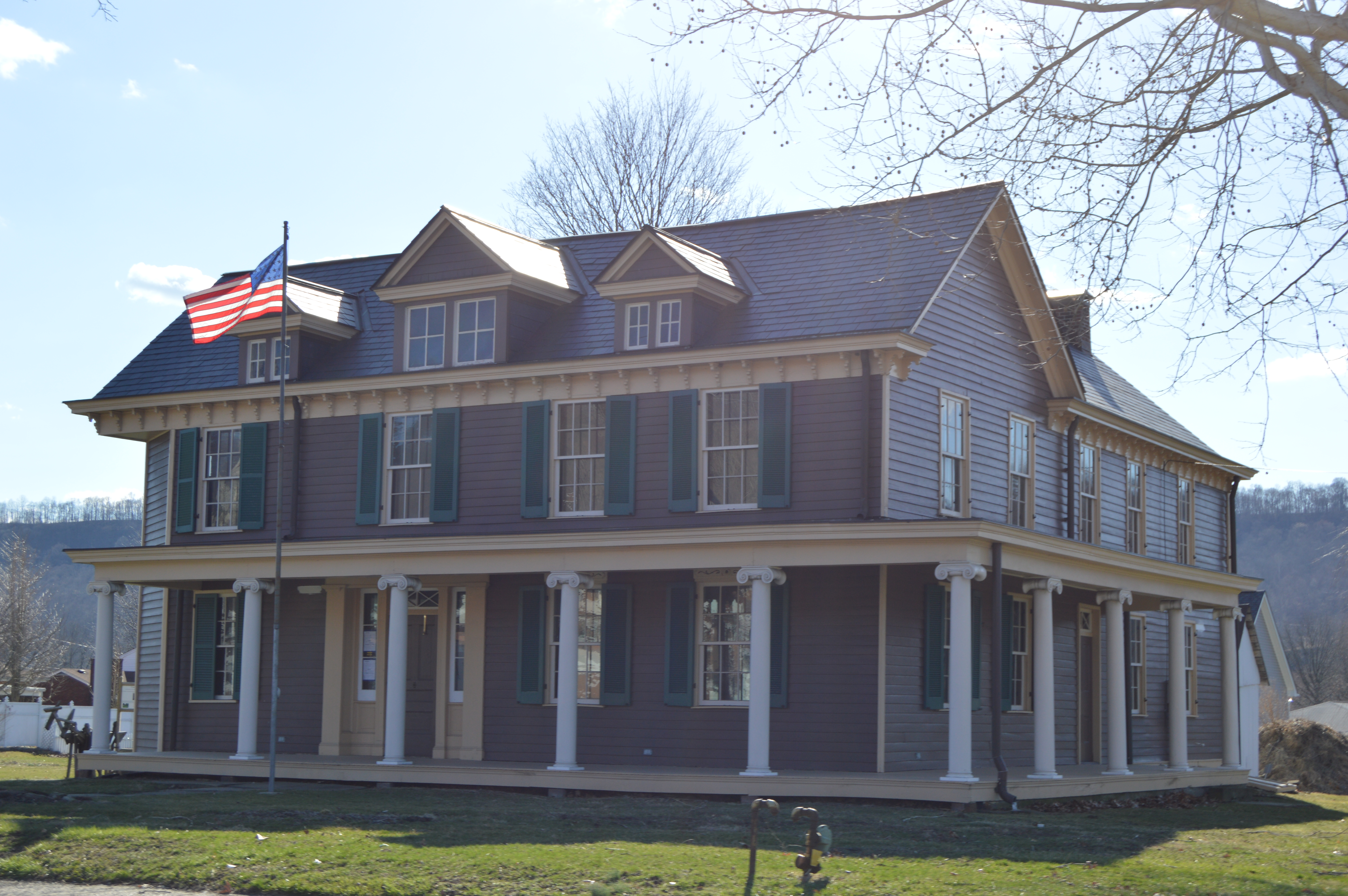
- Front and northern side

- Location within West Virginia Location within the United States
- Location: 1111 Wheeling Ave., Glen Dale, West Virginia
- Coordinates: 39°56′33″N 80°45′17″W
- Area: 0.6 acres (0.24 ha)
- Built: c. 1850
- Architectural style: I-House
- NRHP reference No.: 02001521
- Added to NRHP: December 12, 2002

Bennett Cockayne House is a historic home located at Glen Dale, Marshall County, West Virginia. It was built about 1850, in a vernacular I-house style. It is a two-story, wood-frame building with wooden clapboard siding and a slate roof. Also on the property are a contributing supply shed (c. 1900) and water pump (c. 1900). It was listed on the National Register of Historic Places in 2002.

Built by Moundsville postmaster Bennett Cockayne c. 1850, the Cockayne house served as the first school house in what would later be known as the town of Glen Dale, WV. During the era of Bennett's son, Samuel A. J. Cockayne, whose footprints and initials are imprinted in the stone hearth of the farmhouse, the farm on which the home stood became well known worldwide for its merino wool. Samuel A. J. purchased sheep, cattle, hogs and other livestock from distant farms in order to produce the finest product.

In 1877, the farm was published in what some historians now consider to be “the most extraordinary 'county atlas' produced in the Nineteenth-Century,” when a lithograph of the farm was included in the Illustrated Atlas of the Upper Ohio River Valley from Pittsburgh to Cincinnati. Samuel A. J. and his wife, Hannah Jane Alexander, whom he married in 1863, continued to work the farm for the rest of their lives and by the time their son, Samuel A., inherited the farmhouse and most of the farm in 1917, it had been renamed Glendale Farm.

Samuel A. carried on the farming tradition of the family and earned the designation of “county wool dealer” in 1917. He gathered wool from local farmers and, combined with his own wool, distributed products to eastern markets. In 1924, Samuel A. oversaw the naming of the town of Glen Dale in honor of the farm and, in the 1930s, he became a member of the Washington District board of education and postmaster of the city of Glen Dale.

Samuel A.'s son, Samuel A. J., took over the running of the family farm after serving in the military in World War II. After the war, and following the death of his parents, Samuel A. J. became increasingly reclusive. Although he continued to farm the land, until he sold part of it in order to make way for John Marshall High School in 1965, he chose to spend the majority of his life in only two rooms of the mansion. The house remained in the nineteenth century style, and now features over 1,500 family relics such as photographs and oil paintings of early descendants, a square grand piano complete with original bill of sale issued in 1881, books dating from the 1700s, handwritten letters from the 1800s and handmade furniture from over 200 years ago.

Samuel A. J. donated the house and its contents upon his passing in 2001. The city immediately began a partnership with the Marshall County Historical Society, aiding and expediting the efforts of the community to document, preserve and restore the Cockayne properties. The first major accomplishment of the Cockayne Historical Preservation Committee, which works within the Marshall County Historical Society, was the induction of the Cockayne Property into the National Register of Historic Places in 2002.

== See also ==
- Cockayne Farm Preservation Project
