= William Brownell =

William Brownell may refer to:

- William P. Brownell (1839–1915), American soldier and Medal of Honor recipient
- William Crary Brownell (1851–1928), American literary and art critic
- William A. Whittlesey Brownell (died 1932), American architect, designer of Acacia Lodge
- William A. Brownell (1895–1977), American educational psychologist
- William E. Brownell, American scientist who conducts research at Baylor College of Medicine
- William Brownell (politician) (1862–1916), Australian member of the Tasmanian House of Assembly
