= Bernice Eddy =

American epidemiologist (1903–1989)

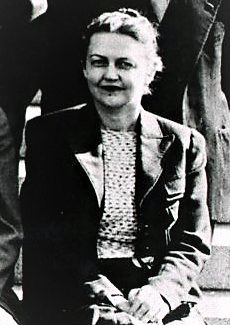
- Bernice Eddy as a staff member of the Laboratory of Biologics Control, 1938
- Born: Bernice E. Eddy; September 30, 1903; Glen Dale, West Virginia
- Died: May 29, 1989 (aged 85)
- Education: Marietta College; University of Cincinnati
- Known for: first describing the polyomavirus, work on the polio vaccine
- Spouse: Dr. Jerald Wooley
- Scientific career
- Fields: Medical research, virology and epidemiology
- Workplaces: United States Public Health Service, National Institutes of Health, American Public Health Association

Bernice Eddy (September 30, 1903 – May 24, 1989) was an American virologist and epidemiologist. She and Sarah Elizabeth Stewart are known for their discoveries related to polyomavirus, particularly SV40 polyomavirus.

== Personal life and education ==
=== Early life ===
Eddy was born in 1903 into a family of physicians in Glen Dale, West Virginia. Eddy and her family: Nathan E. Eddy and Clara C. Eddy (née Griffith), lived in Auburn, West Virginia. She was the oldest of four children. Eddy and her mother moved to Marietta, Ohio a few years after her father's death. Eddy graduated at Marietta College in 1924. She went on to study at University of Cincinnati, earning a Master's degree in 1925 and a bacteriology Ph.D. in 1927.

=== Family life ===
Eddy married Dr. Jerald G. Wooley in 1938, at the age of 35 and the couple worked at National Institutes of Health as bacteriologists. Eddy and Wooley had two daughters, Bernice and Sarah. Jerald Guy Wooley died at the age of 64, leaving Eddy with their two daughters. Eddy was 52 years old when her husband passed, it was noted that her mother helped her raise them.

== National Institutes of Health career ==
In 1930 Eddy joined the United States Public Health Service. In 1935 Eddy transferred to the National Institutes of Health in Bethesda, Maryland, where she joined the Biologics Control Division, the department responsible for checking the quality of vaccines distributed by the Federal government of the United States. Most notably, Eddy was responsible for testing different Polio vaccines from 5 different companies while working in the Biologics Control Division.

=== Flu vaccine testing ===
During World War II, Eddy was made responsible for checking the quality of influenza vaccines used by the United States Army. As part of the Biologics Control Division, Eddy and her team created the first reliable potency test for flu vaccines so that the quality and effectiveness would be consistent throughout manufacturing. Eddy tested Army flu vaccines for 16 years until she was promoted to chief of flu virus vaccine testing in 1944.

=== Polio vaccine research ===
In parallel to her job as chief of flu virus vaccine testing, Eddy began research on polio vaccines at the National Institutes of Health in 1952. 1952 was when the polio virus reached its peak in the US with over 59,000 confirmed cases. In 1953, she was awarded the NIH Superior Accomplishment Award for the research on polio vaccines.

=== Cutter incident ===
In 1954, the National Institutes of Health delegated Eddy to perform safety tests for a batch of inactivated polio vaccines developed by Jonas Salk for Cutter Laboratories. Salk's inactivated polio vaccine was a killed-virus vaccine that was to be used in a massive national vaccination program. Eddy's job was to test the inactivated vaccines from five different companies. After testing the vaccines on 18 monkeys, she and her team discovered that Cutter Laboratories' vaccine contained residual live poliovirus, resulting in the monkeys showing polio-like symptoms and paralysis. Eddy found that three of the six batches paralyzed monkeys and therefore contained live polio virus. These findings pointed to a flawed vaccine manufacturing process at Cutter Laboratories. Eddy reported her findings regarding the flawed vaccines to the head of the Laboratory of Biologics Control, William Workman, who did not heed Eddy's warnings; the identified problems with the vaccine was not passed down to the licensing advisory committee. Workman invalidated Eddy's findings and dismissed her from the polio research. She was put back on duty to test on flu vaccines in response. The flawed vaccine was licensed for use to the public. 120,000 doses of polio vaccine that contained improperly inactivated version of the live polio virus was manufactured and produced. Of children who received the vaccine, 40,000 developed abortive poliomyelitis (a less aggressive form of the disease that does not involve the central nervous system), 51 developed paralytic poliomyelitis—and of these, five children died from polio. The exposures led to an epidemic of polio in the families and communities of the affected children, resulting in the death of 5 children and 113 others paralyzed with the nastier paralytic poliomyelitis. On April 29, 1955 William Sebrell, the director of the National Institutes of Health, chaired a meeting to examine Cutter's manufacturing protocols. The meeting was also attended by Eddy and produced no conclusion on what Cutter should do differently in its manufacturing process.

On May 6, 1955, National Institutes of Health Associate Director Leonard A. Scheele announced to the press that the national polio vaccination program would be postponed until further notice. Vaccine manufacturers withheld 3.9 million doses of polio vaccine as a result, and the polio vaccine program suspension in the United States was followed by a suspension of similar polio vaccination drives in Great Britain, Sweden, West Germany and South Africa. The Cutter incident was one of the worst pharmaceutical disasters in US history, and exposed several thousand children to live polio virus on vaccination. Secretary of Health, Education, and Welfare Oveta Culp Hobby stepped down. Sebrell, the director of the National Institutes of Health, resigned.

=== Polyomavirus research ===
After the Cutter incident in 1954, Eddy had been sidelined for whistleblowing about the presence of live virus in Jonas Salk's inactivated polio vaccine. She was later on approached by Sarah Elizabeth Stewart, her colleague at the National Institutes of Health, in 1956 while both were working on testing common cold vaccines. Stewart asked Eddy for assistance growing the agent causing parotid tumors in mice. Eddy readily agreed and the two women rapidly worked out the characteristics of the agent that was not referred to as a virus in their publications until 1959. Building on earlier work by Ludwik Gross, Stewart and Bernice E. Eddy were the first to describe a polyomavirus. They did so by injecting the mice with ground organs of other mice that were known to contain leukemia, and observing cancerous tumor growth that was unrelated to leukemia. They satisfied Koch's postulates to demonstrate that polyomavirus can cause cancer to be transmitted from animal to animal. Stewart and Eddy continued to test the theory that viral components are able to induce tumors. They tested tumor extracts from both monkey and mouse embryos, and found that the mouse embryos contained a higher quantity of cancer causing viral agents, thus leading them to reason that viruses can be causative agents of cancer. The virus can be absorbed onto guinea pig, hamster, or human 0 erythrocytes in the cold-causing hemag- glutination. They also concluded that the polyomavirus was able to cause 20 different types of mouse tumors. Some of the tumors observed were angiomatous sarcomas in Syrian hamsters, sarcomas in rats, and mesenchymal nodules in rabbits. Eddy and Stewart demonstrated that the virus causes cell necrosis and proliferation in cell culture, that it is highly antigenic, and that it leads to formation of specific antibodies in infected animals whether or not tumors develop. At Eddy's suggestion, the virus was dubbed polyoma, which means many tumors. The virus was named the Stewart-Eddy or SE polyoma virus, after their respective surnames. The results of their collaboration earned them recognition by Time magazine in 1959, featuring a cover story on newly discovered viral agents that cause cancer.

=== Ludwik Gross rivalry ===
Ludwik Gross and Sarah Stewart had been researching cancer-causing viruses concurrently and separately, and had been aware of each other's work since at least December 1952. Both had independently discovered parotid tumors around the same time, and each reprimanded the other for not citing each other's work. When Stewart and Eddy, along with Borgese, published their 1958 paper on a parotid tumor-inducing virus (later named the SE polyomavirus), Gross' earlier work on the parotid virus was not cited. The rivalry came to a peak in 1958, when Jacob Furth attributed the discovery of the parotid tumor virus to both Stewart and Gross. While Gross claimed to be the first discoverer of the virus, Stewart maintained that she and Eddy discovered it independently. When the virus was renamed "SE polyomavirus" for Stewart and Eddy, Gross felt that this diminished his role in the discovery, and he wrote several letters to his peers arguing his point. Later, Eddy would agree, going on to state that, "Sarah was very aggressive. We named it. We probably shouldn't have," and "He (Gross) had that virus before we did. There was no question."

=== SV40 virus research ===
In 1959, Eddy began to conduct safety studies on polio vaccines, which used viruses grown in monkey kidney cells. In 1961, Eddy showed that an extract of rhesus monkey kidney cells used in the creation of the polio vaccine caused tumors in newborn hamsters. Specifically, 109 of 154 hamsters injected with the extract showed signs of tumor growth. The extracts of these neoplasms were transplanted into a new group of mice where similar tumor growth was observed. Tumor extract transplants occurred for 5 generations of mice, where the last group all showed tumor growth. In 1962, Eddy presented evidence that the oncological agent present in the rhesus monkey kidney cell serum was capable of inducing histologically similar tumors under the same conditions as SV40, and that these tumors showed different properties than the SE polyoma virus, which was the only other biological material known to be capable of inducing tumors in almost all hamsters injected as newborns. Similar to SV40, rhesus monkey kidney cell extracts remained infectious after passage through filters, and similar levels of exposure to diethyl ether, heat, and storage at −70 °C. Eddy also provided evidence that the extracts were inhibited (tumors would not develop) under conditions that also inhibited SV40 tumor development. This includes inhibition in animals that received rhesus monkey kidney cell extracts combined with anti-SV40 rabbit serum. Given the preponderance of evidence, this paper drew the conclusion that the oncological agent in the rhesus monkey kidney cell extracts were identical to the SV40 virus.

This discovery was of both practical and theoretical importance. Practically speaking, the discovery explained the origins of the widespread contamination of a variety of stocks of seed viruses and live polio virus vaccine by SV40 that had been written about in a 1960 paper written by Ben Sweet and Maurice Hilleman. Eddy suggested that this contamination could be avoided in the future by screening cultures of C. aethiops kidney cells for the characteristic cytopathic (cellular) changes that SV40 causes. This finding led Merck to voluntarily withdraw its killed-virus polio vaccine. Theoretically speaking, it added to a growing body of evidence that the monkey, like the mouse, could harbor oncogenic (cancer-causing) viruses that could affect other animal species.

In 1998, the National Cancer Institute undertook a large study, using cancer case information from the institute's SEER database. The published findings from the study were considered of little value in a 2002 review that called for further investigation. Another large study in Sweden examined cancer rates of 700,000 individuals who had received potentially contaminated polio vaccine as late as 1957; the study again revealed no increased cancer incidence between persons who received polio vaccines containing SV40 and those who did not.

However, a 1999 study is among those that find that "increased incidence of certain cancers among the 98 million persons exposed to contaminated polio vaccine in the U.S." The question of whether SV40 causes cancer in humans remains controversial, however, and the development of improved assays for detection of SV40 in human tissues will be needed to resolve the controversy.

== Other notable research ==
=== Leprosy research ===
In 1937, Eddy and her colleagues studied multiple aspects of Mycobacterium leprae, the bacteria that causes leprosy, to gain valuable information for future diagnostic purposes. One study conducted by Eddy included finding new mediums on which to culture Mycobacterium leprae in labs. Another notable study done by Eddy includes the research on certain behaviors of leprosy bacteria in the presence of leukocytes.

== Retirement/death ==
Eddy retired from the National Institutes of Health in 1973 aged 70. Upon retirement she received several awards, including a Special Citation from the secretary of the Department of Health, Education, and Welfare (HEW). Eddy died on the 24th of May, 1989 due to cardiopulmonary arrest.

== Awards and honors ==
Eddy received an honorary Doctor of Science degree from Marietta College in 1955, and the United States Department of Health, Education and Welfare awarded her a Superior Service Medal in 1967. She was then honored with the NIH Director's Award in 1977. This is the most prestigious awards ceremony and it honors the great achievements throughout the National Institutes of Health. Eddy and her research partner Sarah E. Stewart were nominated twice for the Nobel Prize.

== Published studies ==
- Eddy, Bernice E. (1944). "A Simplified Procedure for Detecting Cross Reactions in Diagnostic Antipneumococcic Serum". Public Health Reports. 59 (32): 1041–1045. doi:10.2307/4584990. ISSN 0094-6214. JSTOR 4584990. S2CID 80403398.
- Eddy, Bernice E. (1944). "Cross Reactions between the Several Pneumococcic Types and Their Significance in the Preparation of Polyvalent Antiserum". Public Health Reports. 59 (15): 485–499. doi:10.2307/4584847. ISSN 0094-6214. JSTOR 4584847.
- Eddy, Bernice E. (1940). "A Study of Pneumococcus Typing Serums for the Purpose of Standardizing a Test for Potency". Public Health Reports. 55 (9): 347–361. doi:10.2307/4583194. ISSN 0094-6214. JSTOR 4583194.
- Eddy, B. E. (1933-03-01). "Hemoglobinophilic Bacilli from Infantile Meningitis". Journal of Infectious Diseases. 52 (2): 242–245. doi:10.1093/infdis/52.2.242. ISSN 0022-1899.
- Eddy, B. E. (1928-05-01). "Search for Protective, Bacteriophagic and Enzymatic Agents in Pneumonic Sputums". Journal of Infectious Diseases. 42 (5): 449–460. doi:10.1093/infdis/42.5.449. ISSN 0022-1899.
- Eddy, Bernice E. (1944). "A Study of Cross Reactions among the Pneumococcic Types and Their Application to the Identification of Types". Public Health Reports. 59 (14): 451–468. doi:10.2307/4584838. ISSN 0094-6214. JSTOR 4584838.
- Chinn, Alice L.; Eddy, Bernice E. (1941). "Report of a New Type of Pneumococcus Which Crosses with Types X, XI, XX, XXIX, and XXXI Antipneumococcic Serums". Public Health Reports. 56 (2): 62. doi:10.2307/4583579. ISSN 0094-6214. JSTOR 4583579.
- Eddy, Bernice (December 1960). "Neoplasms in Guinea Pigs Infected with Se Polyoma Virus". The Journal of Infectious Diseases. 107 (3): 361–368. doi:10.1093/infdis/107.3.361. JSTOR 30101899. PMID 13725645.
- Ward, T. G.; Eddy, B. E. (1950-10-27). "An Antigenically Distinct Subtype of Influenza Virus A Which is Virulent for Mice in Primary Passage of Allantoic Fluid". Science. 112 (2913): 501–503. Bibcode:1950Sci...112..501W. doi:10.1126/science.112.2913.501. ISSN 0036-8075. PMID 14787447.
- Eddy, Bernice (1951). "Virus and Rickettsial Diseases". American Journal of Public Health and the Nation's Health. 41 (9): 1133–1134. doi:10.2105/AJPH.41.9.1133-b. ISSN 0002-9572. PMC 1525832.
