= Sarah Stewart (cancer researcher) =

Mexican-American cancer researcher

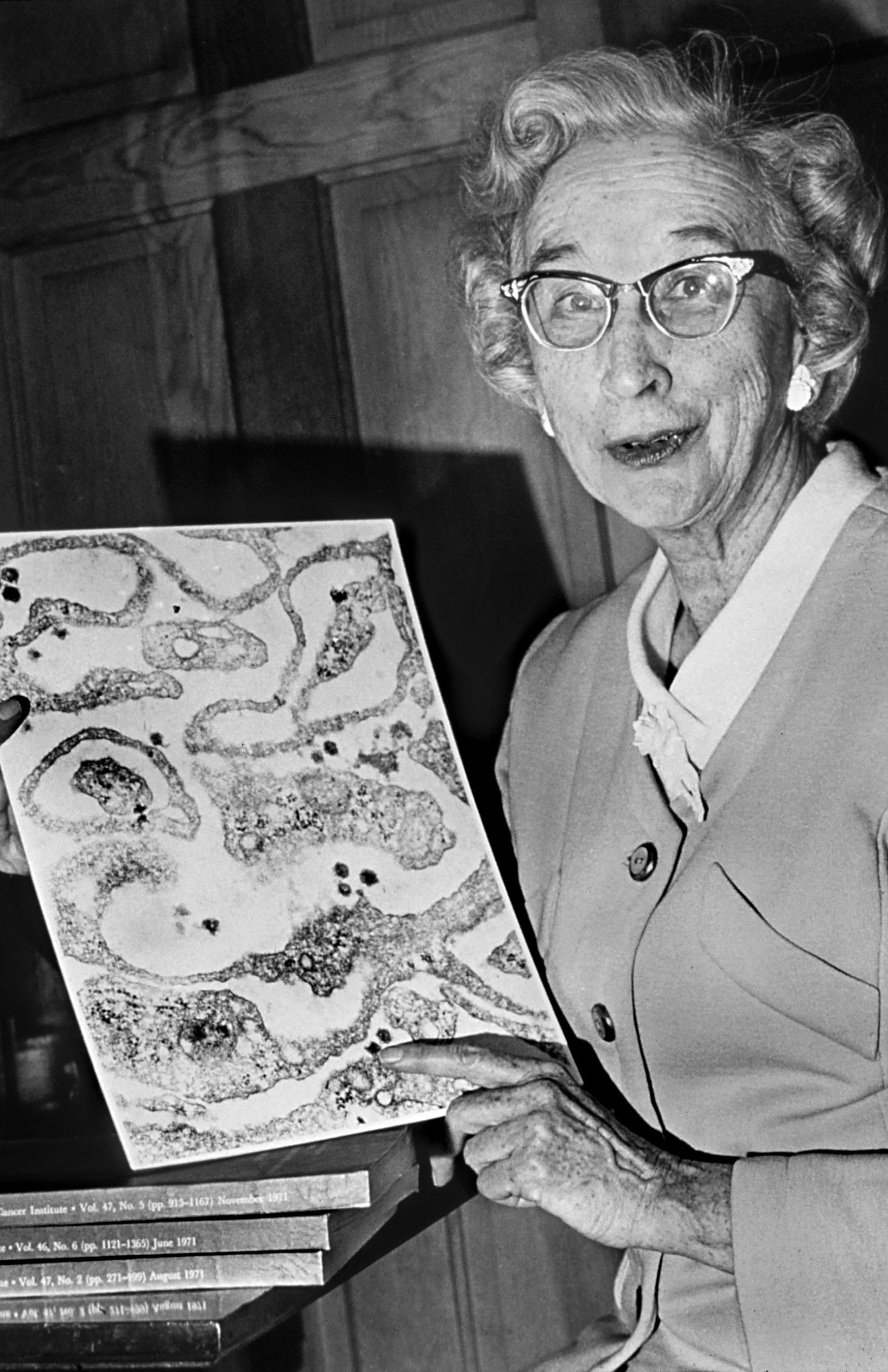
- Sarah Stewart
- Born: August 16, 1905; Tecalitlán, Jalisco, Mexico
- Died: November 27, 1976 (aged 71); New Smyrna Beach, Florida, U.S.
- Resting place: Rock Creek Cemetery; Washington, D.C., U.S.
- Citizenship: U.S.
- Education: New Mexico State University University of Massachusetts Amherst University of Chicago Georgetown University School of Medicine
- Known for: first describing the Polyomavirus
- Scientific career
- Fields: Viral Oncology and Microbiology
- Workplaces: United States Public Health Service

Sarah Elizabeth Stewart (August 16, 1905 – November 27, 1976) was a Mexican-American researcher who pioneered the field of viral oncology research, and the first to show that cancer-causing viruses can spread from animal to animal. She and Bernice Eddy co-discovered the first polyoma virus, and SE (Stewart–Eddy) polyoma virus is named after them.

== Personal life and education ==
=== Early life ===
Sarah Elizabeth Stewart was born on August 16, 1905, in Tecalitlán, Jalisco, Mexico, to a Mexican-born mother and an American mining engineer father. Due to the Mexican Revolution, she and her family were asked to leave the country in 1911, forcing them to migrate to the United States. Stewart would continue to speak Spanish fluently throughout her lifetime. Stewart and her family lived in Cottage Grove, Oregon, where she completed her lower education.

=== Education ===
In 1927, she graduated with two Bachelors in general science and home economics from New Mexico State University. She went on to earn a master's degree from the University of Massachusetts Amherst in 1930 and a Ph.D in microbiology from the University of Chicago in 1939. Stewart worked as a professor of bacteriology at Georgetown University School of Medicine, which allowed her to take medical courses for free until women were allowed to formally enroll in the medical school in 1947. In 1949 at the age of 43, she became the first woman to be awarded an MD Degree from Georgetown University School of Medicine.

== Career ==
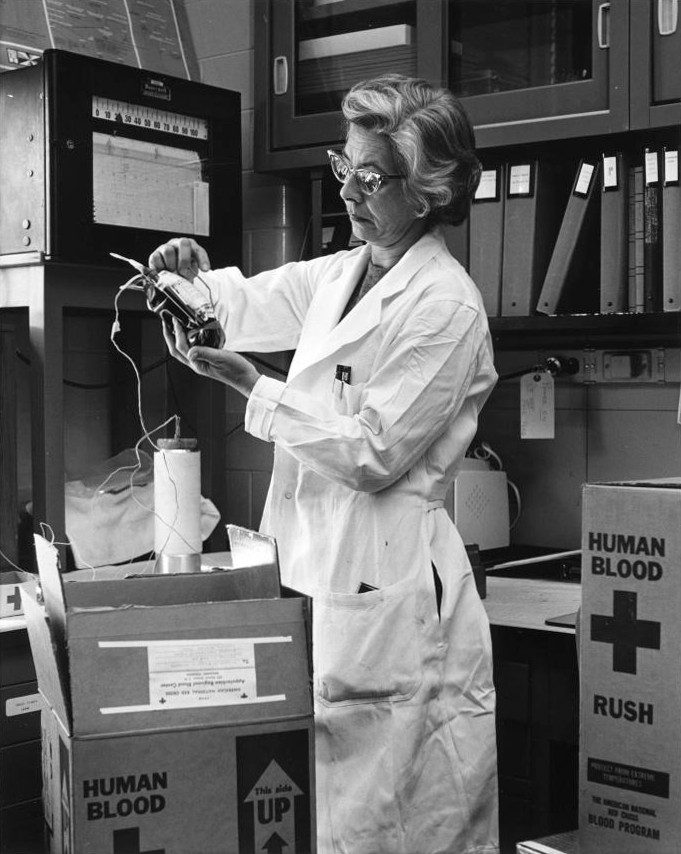
Sarah Elizabeth Stewart, c. 1950

=== National Institutes of Health (NIH) and United States Public Health Service (USPHS) ===
Stewart joined the National Institutes of Health (NIH) as a bacteriologist from 1935 to 1944 while completing her PhD at the University of Chicago. She managed to publish 7 papers pertaining to anaerobic bacteria while she was completing her PhD. During her time at the NIH, she also took part in developing a vaccine for gangrene, which helped many soldiers during the second world war. During her scientific career, Stewart had not thought of studying about cancer until she entered in the field of Oncology. She later left her position in the NIH in order to pursue her goals in the research field as a commissioned officer of the United States Public Health Service at the National Cancer Institute in 1951. Here Stewart aimed to prove that there was a connection between cancers and viruses. Stewart retired from the United States Public Health Service in 1970 and became a professor in the Department of Pathology at Georgetown University until 1974.

=== Professional hurdles ===
Stewart's status as a woman in the medical field in the 1940s and 1950s came with additional challenges. When requesting to work on cancer research at the NIH, she was told she was not qualified to do so. She audited classes at Georgetown University School of Medicine (GUSOM) as a bacteriology instructor until women were permitted to enroll, after which she became GUSOM's first female graduate at age 39. After completing her medical degree, Stewart wrote a protocol for work on cancer-causing viruses and sent it to the director of the National Cancer Institute. Stewart instead was assigned to gynecology, as was many of the female doctors at the time. In addition, the two fields of cancer research and viruses were thought to be completely separate, as their connection was commonly disregarded by the scientific community at the time. This led to the common belief that virologists were not qualified to take part in cancer research, whereas microbiologists were thought to be overqualified. Despite these obstacles, Stewart continued to pursue her passion for cancer research and viruses, ultimately earning numerous achievements in her field.

=== Polyomavirus research ===
In 1951, Stewart was reassigned to the Marine Hospital in Baltimore where she finally was able to work in the field of cancer. Stewart is credited with discovering the polyomavirus in 1953. In 1956, Stewart approached Bernice Eddy for assistance growing the agent causing parotid tumors in mice. Eddy readily agreed and the two women rapidly worked out the characteristics of the agent that was not referred to as a virus in their publications until 1959. Building on earlier work by Ludwig Gross, Stewart and Bernice E. Eddy were the first to describe a polyomavirus. They did so by injecting the mice with ground organs of other mice that were known to contain leukemia, and observing cancerous tumor growth that was unrelated to leukemia. They satisfied Koch's postulates to demonstrate that polyomavirus can cause cancer to be transmitted from animal to animal. Although it has been demonstrated that SE polyoma virus produces tumors in rodents under laboratory conditions, it is known that the parotid gland tumors and others of the spectrum produced in mice rarely are found under natural conditions, even though it has been found that many mouse colonies have the virus as a latent infection.

Stewart and Eddy continued to test the theory that viral components are able to induce tumors. They tested tumor extracts from both monkey and mouse embryos, and found that the mouse embryos contained a higher quantity of cancer causing viral agents. This lead them to reason that viruses can be causative agents of cancer. They also concluded that the polyomavirus was able to cause 20 different types of mouse tumors. Some of the tumors observed were angiomatous sarcomas in Syrian hamsters, sarcomas in rats, and mesenchymal nodules in rabbits.

Eddy and Stewart demonstrated that the virus causes cell necrosis and proliferation in cell culture, that it is highly antigenic, and that it leads to formation of specific antibodies in infected animals whether or not tumors develop. At Eddy's suggestion, the virus was dubbed "polyoma", meaning many tumors. The virus was named the Stewart–Eddy or SE polyoma virus, after their respective surnames. The results of their collaboration earned them recognition by Time magazine in 1959, featuring a cover story on newly discovered viral agents that cause cancer. This experiment and its results, amongst other similar experiments, led many researchers to becoming interested in the field of viral oncology.

=== Ludwik Gross rivalry ===
In December 1952, Ludwik Gross, a virologist, received a letter from Stewart as she had questions regarding Gross' research on the etiological agent of leukemia in mice. Stewart and Gross were both studying and researching on cancer-causing viruses concurrently and separately. They each seemed to be unaware of the other until December 1952 when Gross was contacted by Stewart. Stewart wrote to Gross as she was attempting to confirm Gross' work on the leukemia virus as her findings were different, she requested for Gross to send her some mice he was working on. Instead, Gross invited Stewart to his lab in New York in early 1953 to learn more about his research and pick up the mice she previously requested for.

Stewart's first observation of the parotid tumor was in July 1952. She later presented her results at the AAAS meeting in December 1953 but was invalidated as her findings did not satisfy the Koch's postulate. Her unsuccess spurred new ideas which led her to propose a collaborative study with several people from the NCI and NIH, but that was an unsuccess as well. Unaware that Gross had already observed parotid tumors, Stewart deemed her discovery as uniquely her own. She thought that Gross had heard about the research through her when she visited his laboratory in New York. The conflict arose when Stewart and Gross admonished each other for failing to appropriately credit the other's paper.

The rivalry came to a peak in 1958, when Jacob Furth attributed the discovery of the parotid tumor virus to both Stewart and Gross. The discovery of the parotid tumor virus was initially credited to both Gross and Stewart, and eventually the virus was named after Stewart and Eddy, now known as the "SE polyomavirus". Gross was infuriated, traditionally, the first scientist that finds a new discovery gets to name it. So, since Gross believed that he discovered the polyoma virus first during his initial experiments with the leukemia virus, he thought that he should've had the chance to name the virus. However, Stewart was also insistent that she discovered the virus first, during the summer of 1952 before she met Gross, and that her virus was produced under different conditions and different mouse strains than Gross's virus. Most organizations and researchers credited Stewart and Eddy for the finding, though Gross did not let his frustrations go unheard, leading him to write a number of letter to publishers. However, Eddy later admitted that Gross found the virus first, but she knew Stewart would never admit it.

=== Other research ===
Stewart helped to identify other viruses in her lifetime, such as herpes, Burkitt's and what are known as C-type viruses. C-type viruses are not as strong as A and B and typically effect people more mildly than others. However, it has occasionally been linked to the development of Leukemia. It became known that there were some viruses that could lead to or be a cause for certain cancers. Stewart developed an interest in researching these viral links to cancer in light of the pioneering research of Jonas Salk in developing a vaccine for the virus which caused polio.

== Death and afterward ==
Stewart herself was diagnosed with the disease she spent her life researching, cancer. Beginning with ovarian cancer and then obtaining lung cancer which ultimately costing her life. Long time colleague and friend Bernice Eddy said that Stewart continued to do work and more research until she became too sick to work in 1974. She died in her home in New Smyrna Beach, Florida on November 27, 1976. Stewart was interred at the Rock Creek Cemetery on May 23, 1977. Her memorial service was held at the Presbyterian Church in Bethesda, Maryland. Today, a collection of her papers is held at the National Library of Medicine in Bethesda, Maryland and are viewed by researchers, students, professors, health professionals and even the public to continue to learn more about her research and work.

== Awards and honors ==
In 1965, Stewart was awarded the Federal Women's Award by President Lyndon B. Johnson as a US Public Health Service Commissioned Officer and for her scientific contributions to the study of viral etiologies of cancer. The purpose of the Federal Women's Award is to recognize women who are doing great works in the Federal Service and to express gratitude for their service. She also won the Lenghi Award of the Accademia Nazionale Dei Lincei in Rome and the Daughters of Penelope Salute to Women Award in 1972. The Daughters of Penelope Salute Award is to honor women who promote Hellenism, education, philanthropy, civic responsibility and family and individual excellence, which Stewart did with her research. She was also awarded the John Carroll Award in 1975. This award is given to Georgetown Alumni who, like Stewart, have achieved things that exemplify what Georgetown set their ideals and traditions to be. Besides all the honorary awards, Stewart and Dr. Bernice E. Eddy were also nominated twice for the Nobel Prize.

Today, the Sarah Stewart Scholarship at the Georgetown University School of Medicine (GUSOM) selects incoming GUSOM students who demonstrate "great potential for academic and research contributions," with particular emphasis on healthcare equity and medical ethics.

== Published studies ==
1. Stewart, Sarah E. (1953). "Leukemia in mice produced by a filterable agent present in AKR leukemic tissues with notes on a sarcoma produced by the same agent". Anatomical Record. 117 (3): 532. In: "American society of zoologiests". The Anatomical Record. 117 (3): 499–653. November 1953. doi:10.1002/ar.1091170311.
2. Stewart, Sarah E. (April 1955). "Neoplasms in mice inoculated with cell-free extracts or filtrates of leukemic mouse tissues. I. Neoplasms of the parotid and adrenal glands". Journal of the National Cancer Institute. 15 (5): 1391–1415. doi:10.1093/jnci/15.5.1391. PMID 14368279.
3. Eddy, Bernice E.; Stewart, Sarah E.; Stanton, Mearl F.; Marcotte, Jerry M. (January 1959). "Induction of tumors in rats by tissue-culture preparations of SE polyoma virus". Journal of the National Cancer Institute. 22 (1): 161–171. doi:10.1093/jnci/22.1.161. PMID 13621203.
