= Cutter Laboratories =

Defunct American pharmaceutical company

Cutter Laboratories was a family-owned pharmaceutical company located in Berkeley, California, founded by Edward Ahern Cutter in 1897. Cutter's early products included anthrax vaccine, hog cholera (swine fever) virus, and anti-hog cholera serum—and eventually a hog cholera vaccine. The hog cholera vaccine was the first tissue culture vaccine, human or veterinary, ever produced. The company expanded considerably during World War II as a consequence of government contracts for blood plasma and penicillin. After Edward Cutter's death, his three sons—Robert K. Cutter (president), Edward "Ted" A. Cutter Jr. (vice-president), and Frederick A. Cutter—ran the company. In the next generation Robert's son David followed his father as president of the company. The Bayer pharmaceutical company bought Cutter Laboratories in 1974.

== Cutter incident ==
On April 12, 1955, following the announcement of the success of the polio vaccine trial, Cutter Laboratories became one of several companies that was recommended to be given a license by the United States government to produce Jonas Salk's polio vaccine. In anticipation of the demand for vaccine, the companies had already produced stocks of the vaccine and these were issued once the licenses were signed.

In what became known as the Cutter incident, some lots of the Cutter vaccine—despite passing required safety tests—contained live polio virus in what was supposed to be an inactivated-virus vaccine. Cutter withdrew its vaccine from the market on April 27 after vaccine-associated cases were reported.

The mistake produced 120,000 doses of polio vaccine that contained live polio virus. Of children who received the vaccine, 40,000 developed abortive poliomyelitis (a form of the disease that does not involve the central nervous system), 56 developed paralytic poliomyelitis—and of these, five children died from polio. The exposures led to an epidemic of polio in the families and communities of the affected children, resulting in a further 113 people paralyzed and 5 deaths. The director of the microbiology institute lost his job, as did the equivalent of the assistant secretary for health. Secretary of Health, Education, and Welfare Oveta Culp Hobby stepped down. William H. Sebrell Jr, the director of the NIH, resigned.

Surgeon General Scheele sent William Tripp and Karl Habel from the NIH to inspect Cutter's Berkeley facilities, question workers, and examine records. After a thorough investigation, they found nothing wrong with Cutter's production methods. A congressional hearing in June 1955 concluded that the problem was primarily the lack of scrutiny from the NIH Laboratory of Biologics Control (and its excessive trust in the National Foundation for Infantile Paralysis reports).

A number of civil lawsuits were filed against Cutter Laboratories in subsequent years, the first of which was Gottsdanker v. Cutter Laboratories. The jury found Cutter not negligent, but liable for breach of implied warranty, and awarded the plaintiffs monetary damages. This set a precedent for later lawsuits. All five companies that produced the Salk vaccine in 1955—Eli Lilly, Parke-Davis, Wyeth, Pitman-Moore, and Cutter—had difficulty completely inactivating the polio virus. Three companies other than Cutter were sued, but the cases settled out of court.

The Cutter incident was one of the worst pharmaceutical disasters in US history, and exposed 120,000 children to live polio virus on vaccination, resulting in tens of thousands of cases of polio, hundreds of cases of paralysis, and ten known deaths. The NIH Laboratory of Biologics Control, which had certified the Cutter polio vaccine, had received advance warnings of problems: in 1954, staff member Bernice Eddy had reported to her superiors that some inoculated monkeys had become paralyzed and provided photographs. William Sebrell, the director of NIH, rejected the report.

== Expansion ==
Despite lawsuits resulting from vaccine-related cases of polio, Cutter Laboratories successfully expanded its business. Between 1955 and 1960, they purchased:

- Veterinary product manufacturers Ashe-Lockhart, Inc. and Haver-Glover Laboratories of Kansas City
- Plastic manufacturers Plastron Specialties, Pacific Plastics Company in San Francisco, and Olympic Plastics Company in Los Angeles
- An animal feed farm, Corn King Company, in Cedar Rapids
- A plant-derived allergy medicine company, Hollister-Stier, in Spokane, Los Angeles, Philadelphia, and Atlanta

In 1960, Cutter established Cutter Laboratories Pacific, Inc. in Japan. Annual Cutter company sales had increased from $11,482,000 in 1955 to $29,934,000 in 1962. In the early 1960s, Cutter's catalog listed more than 700 products, and in 1962, the company's assets were "80% greater than when the polio disaster had occurred." Cutter Laboratories was purchased by the German chemical and pharmaceutical company Bayer in 1974.

== Other incidents ==
In the late 1970s through 1980s, numerous companies, including Bayer's Cutter Biologic division, produced unsafe blood products (specifically factor VIII) to treat hemophilia. The pharmaceutical product, produced from blood from donors across the US, was contaminated with the HIV virus at a time when HIV could not be screened out. These problems led to lawsuits over the next 20 years.

A 2008 German documentary called Tödlicher Ausverkauf: Wie BAYER AIDS nach Asien importierte (Deadly Sale: How Bayer imported AIDS into Asia) researched the Koate product for hemophiliacs sold by Bayer's Cutter division under full knowledge of its HIV contamination.
