= Moundsville Commercial Historic District =

Historic district in West Virginia, United States

- U.S. National Register of Historic Places
- U.S. Historic district
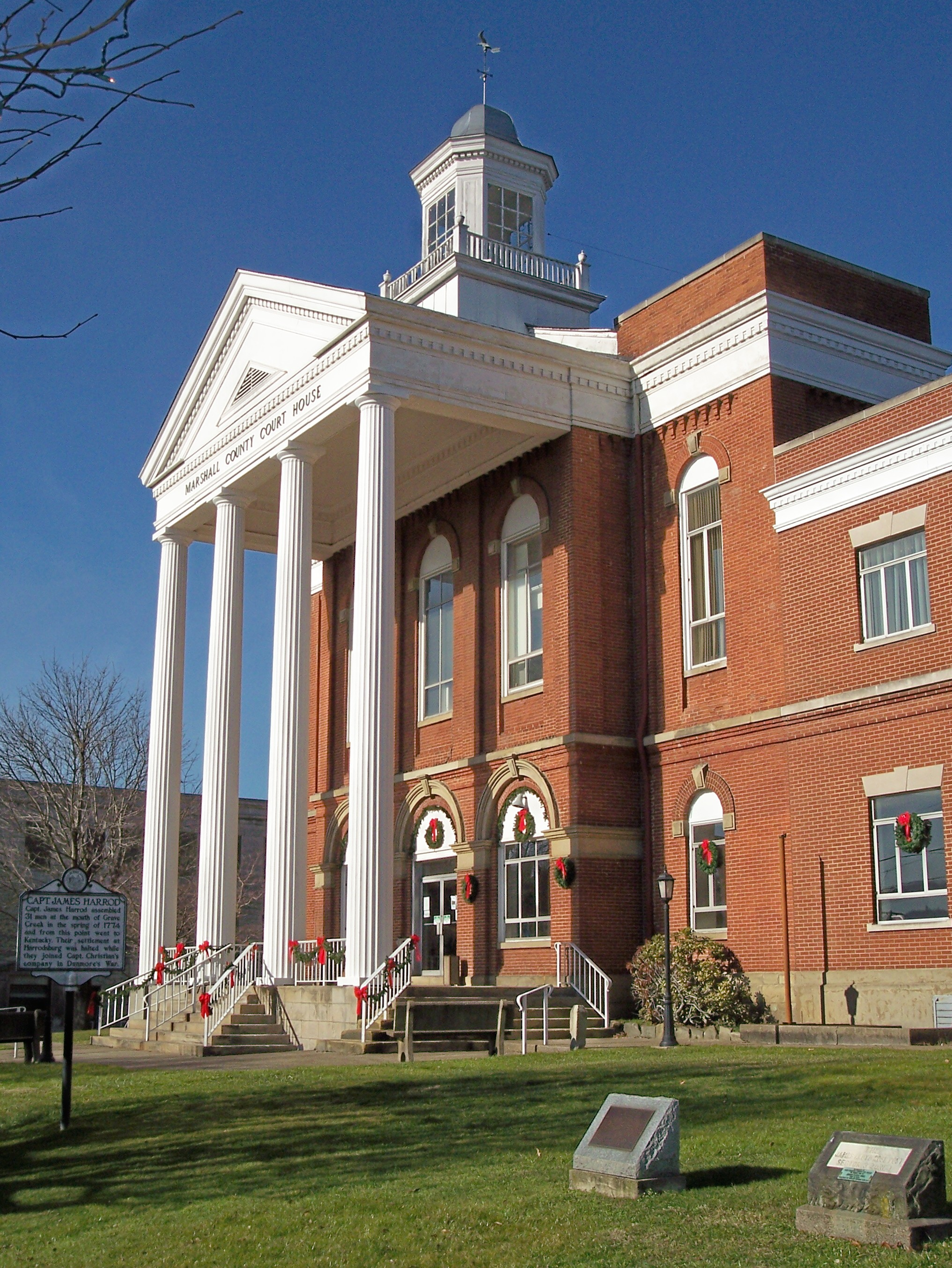
- Marshall County Courthouse, December 2006

- Location within West Virginia Location within the United States
- Interactive map showing the location of Moundsville Commercial Historic District
- Location: Roughly, Jefferson Ave. from Second to Seventh Sts., Seventh from Jefferson to Lafayette Ave. and Lafayette S of Seventh, Moundsville, West Virginia
- Coordinates: 39°55′15″N 80°44′49″W
- Area: 15 acres (6.1 ha)
- Built: 1835
- Architect: Batson, William H.
- Architectural style: Early Republic, Mid 19th Century Revival, Late Victorian
- NRHP reference No.: 95000252
- Added to NRHP: March 17, 1995

Moundsville Commercial Historic District is a national historic district located at Moundsville, Marshall County, West Virginia. It encompasses 72 contributing buildings in the central business district of Moundsville. They are large 2-4 story brick buildings reflecting the Georgian and Late Victorian styles. Notable buildings include the Marshall House (c. 1835), Roberts House (c. 1850), F.O.E. Building (1940), State Food Store (1939), Simpson United Methodist Church (1907), First Christian Church (1899), St. Francis Xavier Roman Catholic Church (1917), Strand Theater (1920), Marshall County Courthouse (1876), and Post Office and Federal Building (1914). Located within the district is the separately listed Ferrell-Holt House.

It was listed on the National Register of Historic Places in 1998.
