= Cameron Downtown =

- U.S. National Register of Historic Places
- U.S. Historic district
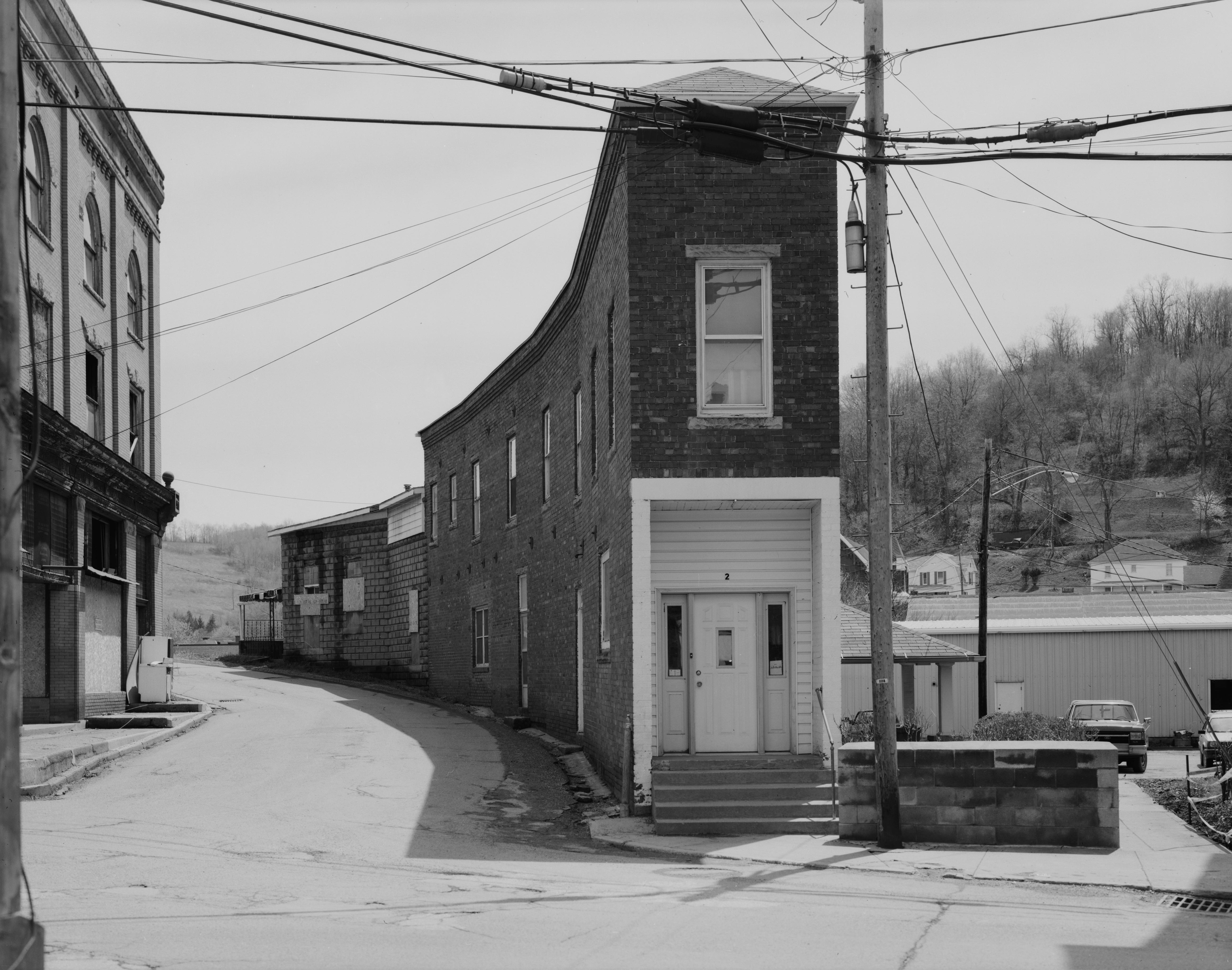
- B&O Building / Ford Building, 2 Main Street

- Location within West Virginia Location within the United States
- Location: Roughly Bounded by Church St., Waynesburg Ave., Main St., and Park St., Cameron, West Virginia
- Coordinates: 39°49′35″N 80°33′57″W
- Area: 12 acres (4.9 ha)
- Built: 1895
- Architect: Hamilton, Carl
- Architectural style: Classical Revival, Colonial Revival
- NRHP reference No.: 98001473
- Added to NRHP: December 4, 1998

Cameron Downtown Historic District is a national historic district located at Cameron, Marshall County, West Virginia. It encompasses 27 contributing buildings in the commercial core developed after a severe fire in 1895 which destroyed much of the downtown area. They are large 2-4 story brick buildings reflecting the Classical Revival and Colonial Revival styles. Notable buildings include the Masonic Lodge 17 (c. 1900), Romine Building/Moose Lodge 758 (c. 1900), First Presbyterian Church (1907), First United Methodist Church (1894), Hotel Main (c. 1896-1897), Finlayson's 5 & 10/ Senior Citizens Building (c. 1896), Flatiron Building (1896), First Christian Church of Cameron (1896), and Old B&O Freight Station (1878).

It was listed on the National Register of Historic Places in 1998.
