= Spencer Cemetery =

Cemetery in Marshal County, West Virginia, US

- U.S. National Register of Historic Places
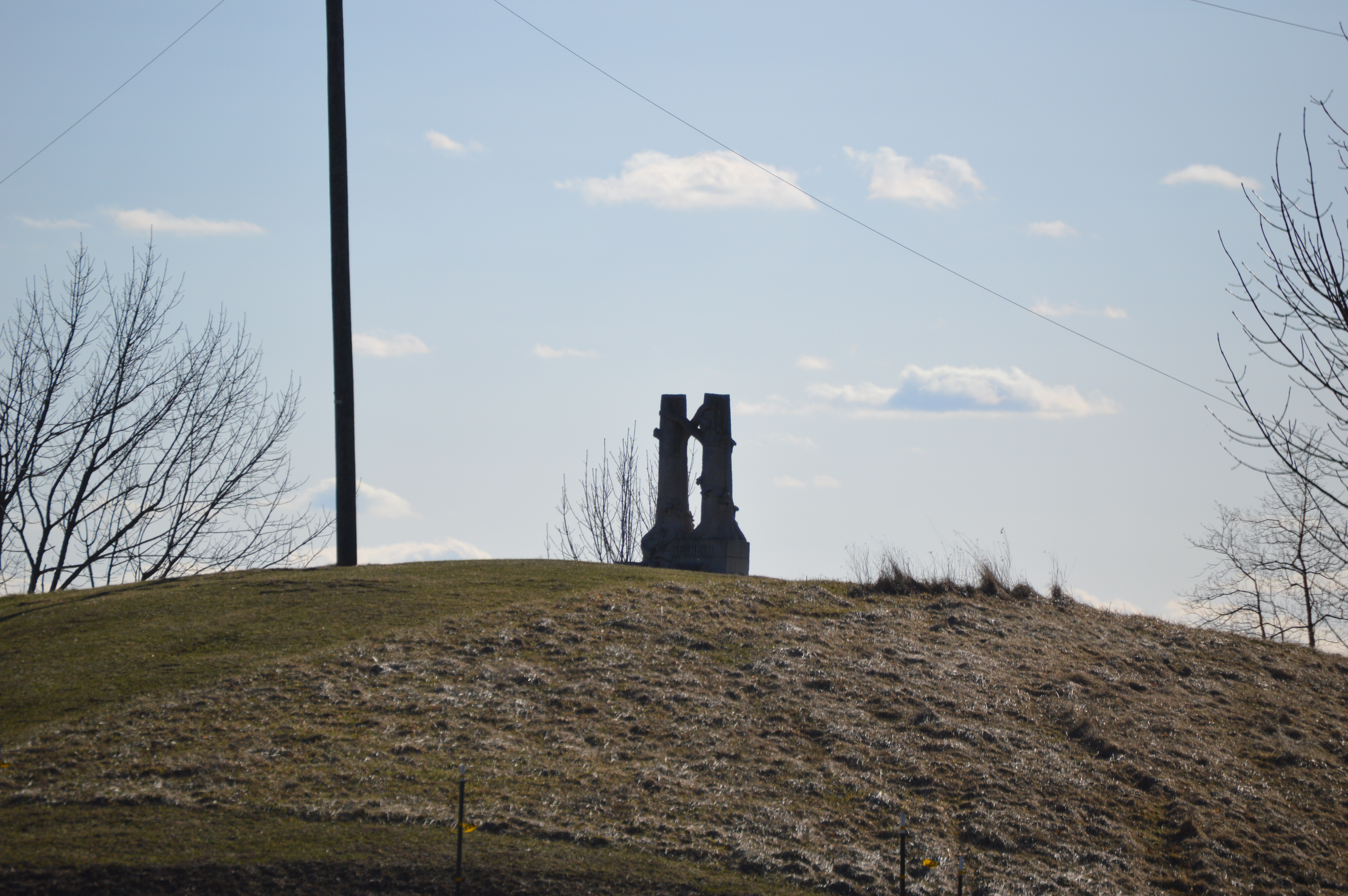
- Silhouetted on the hilltop

- Location within West Virginia Location within the United States
- Location: 668 Burley Hill Rd., Cameron, West Virginia
- Coordinates: 39°52′01″N 80°32′15″W
- Area: Less than one acre
- Built: 1914
- NRHP reference No.: 12001051
- Added to NRHP: December 12, 2012

Spencer Cemetery is a historic cemetery located at Cameron, Marshall County, West Virginia. The cemetery includes just one grave monument and two related headstones for John W. "Jack" Spencer (1841–1914) and his third wife, Eva "Effie" (Winters) Spencer (1866–1919). The eight foot-tall carved limestone marker is in the shape of two tree trunks with entwined branches. It includes an engraved badge of the Grand Army of the Republic (GAR).

It was listed on the National Register of Historic Places in 2012.
