= Cameron City Pool =

- Cameron City Pool-PWA Project 1196
- U.S. National Register of Historic Places
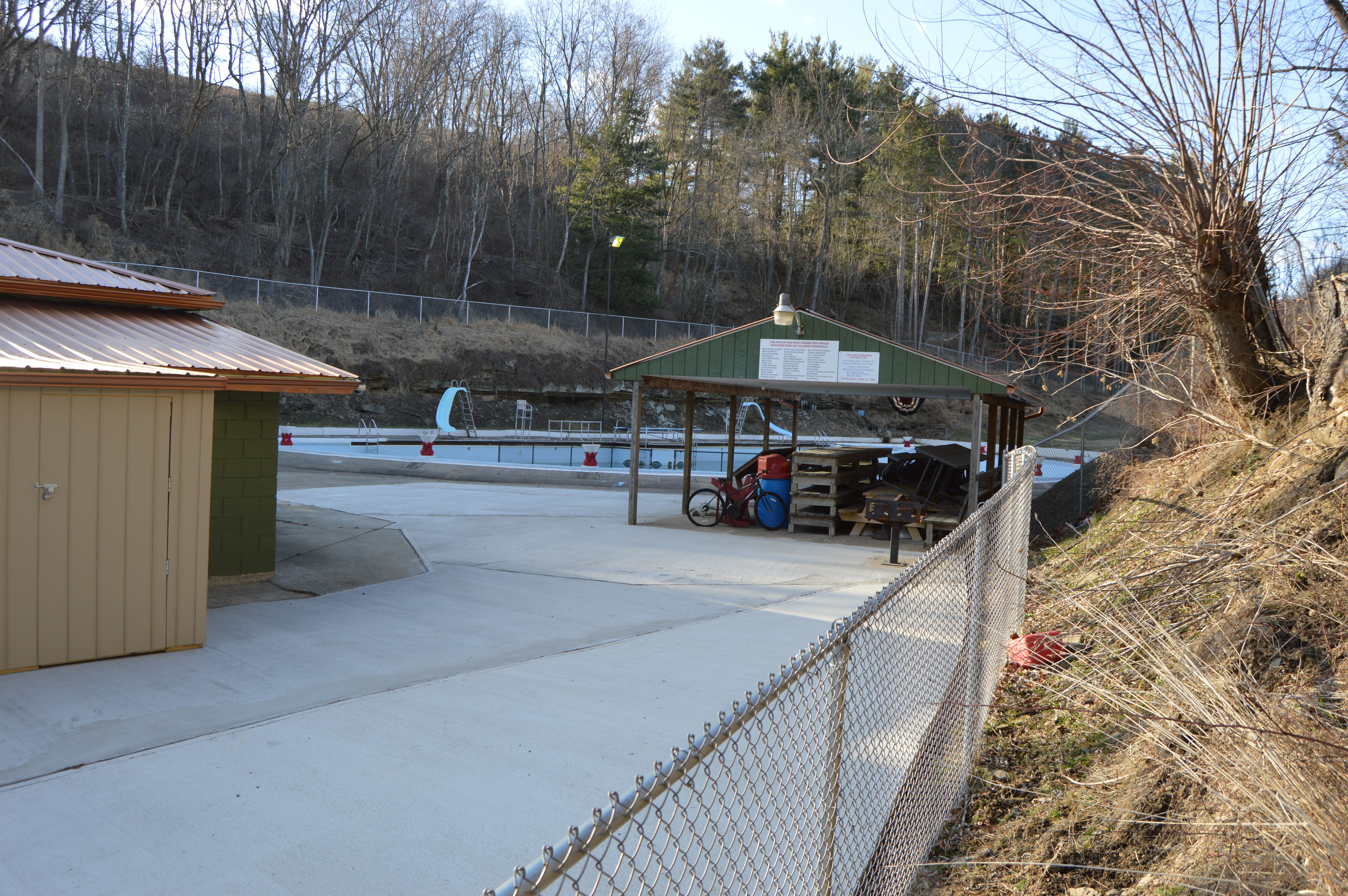
- Overview from the south

- Location within West Virginia Location within the United States
- Location: Park St., Cameron, West Virginia
- Coordinates: 39°49′46″N 80°34′2″W
- Area: 2 acres (0.81 ha)
- Built: 1939
- Architect: Hunter, Frank
- NRHP reference No.: 93000612
- Added to NRHP: July 14, 1993

Cameron City Pool-PWA Project 1196 is a historic swimming pool located at Cameron, Marshall County, West Virginia. It was built in 1939, with a grant from the Public Works Administration. It consists of a semi-circular pool with underwater lifeguard station, and a wooden bath house. It incorporates a beach area and is recognized as a potential fire fighting emergency water reserve.

It was listed on the National Register of Historic Places in 1993.
