= Cameron, West Virginia =

City in West Virginia, US

- City
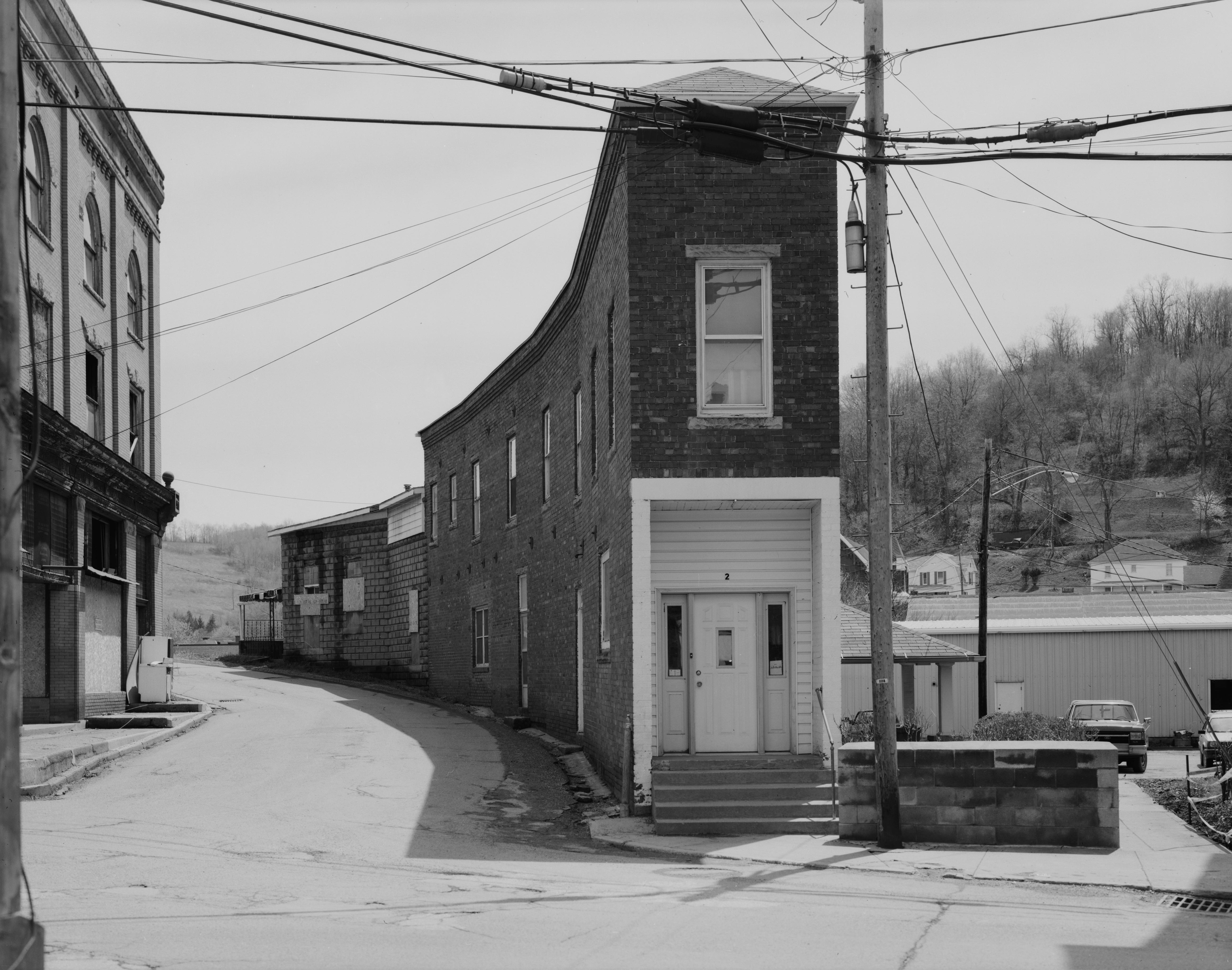
- Front of the Curved Building, a local landmark
- Nickname: Dragon Country
- Location of Cameron in Marshall County, West Virginia.
- Coordinates: 39°49′36″N 80°33′58″W
- Country: United States
- State: West Virginia
- County: Marshall
- Incorporated: 1861 and 1879

Area
  - Total: 0.87 sq mi (2.26 km^{2})
  - Land: 0.86 sq mi (2.22 km^{2})
  - Water: 0.012 sq mi (0.03 km^{2})
- Elevation: 1,066 ft (325 m)

Population (2020)
  - Total: 861
  - Estimate (2021): 834
  - Density: 981.7/sq mi (379.02/km^{2})
- Time zone: UTC-5 (Eastern (EST))
  - Summer (DST): UTC-4 (EDT)
- ZIP code: 26033
- Area code: 304
- FIPS code: 54-12484
- GNIS feature ID: 1536882
- Website: https://cameronwv.com

Cameron is a city in Marshall County, West Virginia, United States. It is part of the Wheeling metropolitan area. The population was 849 at the 2020 census.

== Geography ==
Cameron is located at 39°49′36″N 80°33′58″W (39.826579, -80.566107).

According to the United States Census Bureau, the city has a total area of 0.87 square miles (2.25 km^{2}), of which 0.86 square miles (2.23 km^{2}) is land and 0.01 square miles (0.03 km^{2}) is water.

== Demographics ==
Historical population
Census	Pop.	Note	%±
1900	964		—
1910	1,660		72.2%
1920	2,404		44.8%
1930	2,281		−5.1%
1940	1,998		−12.4%
1950	1,736		−13.1%
1960	1,652		−4.8%
1970	1,537		−7.0%
1980	1,474		−4.1%
1990	1,177		−20.1%
2000	1,212		3.0%
2010	946		−21.9%
2020	861		−9.0%
2021 (est.)	834		−3.1%
U.S. Decennial Census

=== 2020 census ===
As of the 2020 census, Cameron had a population of 861. The median age was 42.2 years. 21.5% of residents were under the age of 18 and 22.5% of residents were 65 years of age or older. For every 100 females there were 85.2 males, and for every 100 females age 18 and over there were 84.2 males age 18 and over.

0.0% of residents lived in urban areas, while 100.0% lived in rural areas.

There were 344 households in Cameron, of which 29.9% had children under the age of 18 living in them. Of all households, 33.7% were married-couple households, 23.3% were households with a male householder and no spouse or partner present, and 34.6% were households with a female householder and no spouse or partner present. About 36.3% of all households were made up of individuals and 14.9% had someone living alone who was 65 years of age or older.

There were 418 housing units, of which 17.7% were vacant. The homeowner vacancy rate was 1.5% and the rental vacancy rate was 25.4%.

Racial composition as of the 2020 census
Race	Number	Percent
White	842	97.8%
Black or African American	1	0.1%
American Indian and Alaska Native	1	0.1%
Asian	0	0.0%
Native Hawaiian and Other Pacific Islander	0	0.0%
Some other race	0	0.0%
Two or more races	17	2.0%
Hispanic or Latino (of any race)	3	0.3%

=== 2010 census ===
At the 2010 census there were 946 people, 400 households, and 258 families living in the city. The population density was 1,100.0 inhabitants per square mile (424.7/km^{2}). There were 542 housing units at an average density of 630.2 per square mile (243.3/km^{2}). The racial makeup of the city was 98.6% White, 0.2% African American, 0.4% Asian, and 0.7% from two or more races. Hispanic or Latino of any race were 0.6%.

Of the 400 households 33.0% had children under the age of 18 living with them, 41.3% were married couples living together, 17.0% had a female householder with no husband present, 6.3% had a male householder with no wife present, and 35.5% were non-families. 31.5% of households were one person and 15.8% were one person aged 65 or older. The average household size was 2.37 and the average family size was 2.90.

The median age was 39.4 years. 24.4% of residents were under the age of 18; 8.1% were between the ages of 18 and 24; 24.9% were from 25 to 44; 26.5% were from 45 to 64; and 16.1% were 65 or older. The gender makeup of the city was 46.7% male and 53.3% female.

=== 2000 census ===
At the 2000 census there were 1,212 people, 478 households, and 305 families living in the city. The population density was 1,357.9 people per square mile (525.8/km^{2}). There were 533 housing units at an average density of 597.2 per square mile (231.2/km^{2}). The racial makeup of the city was 98.93% White, 0.17% African American, 0.08% Native American, 0.08% from other races, and (0.74% from two or more races. Hispanic or Latino of any race were 0.25%.

Of the 478 households 27.6% had children under the age of 18 living with them, 45.6% were married couples living together, 13.8% had a female householder with no husband present, and 36.0% were non-families. 31.0% of households were one person and 20.1% were one person aged 65 or older. The average household size was 2.41 and the average family size was 2.99.

The age distribution was 24.0% under the age of 18, 8.7% from 18 to 24, 23.4% from 25 to 44, 21.0% from 45 to 64, and 22.9% 65 or older. The median age was 41 years. For every 100 females, there were 85.0 males. For every 100 females age 18 and over, there were 77.1 males.

The median household income was $25,119 and the median family income was $26,958. Males had a median income of $31,875 versus $14,438 for females. The per capita income for the city was $11,447. About 26.9% of families and 30.6% of the population were below the poverty line, including 44.4% of those under age 18 and 14.1% of those age 65 or over.

== History and culture ==
The town has the name of Samuel Cameron, a railroad worker.

Cameron's historical beach-style swimming pool, known as Cameron City Pool-PWA Project 1196, is one of a few in the entire nation. Cameron was a Socialist Party of America stronghold in the early 1900s. Cameron Downtown is a national historic district listed on the National Register of Historic Places in 1998. The Spencer Cemetery was added in 2012.

== Notable people ==
- Charles Sheedy, resident and member of the West Virginia House of Delegates
