= Cockayne Farm Preservation Project =

- Bennett Cockayne House
- U.S. National Register of Historic Places
- Location within West Virginia Location within the United States
- Location: Glen Dale, West Virginia
- Coordinates: 39°56′33″N 80°45′17″W
- Area: 0.6 acres (0.24 ha)
- Built: c. 1850
- Architectural style: I-House
- NRHP reference No.: 02001521
- Added to NRHP: December 12, 2002

The Cockayne Farm Preservation Project is an undertaking by the Glen Dale, West Virginia city government and the Marshall County Historical Society. The centerpiece of the project, The Bennett Cockayne House, a property on the National Register of Historic Places, was given to the city in the will of Samuel Cockayne in 2001. A committee was formed by the city for preservation of the property, which led to the property being listed on the National Register and in finalizing a lease agreement with the Marshall County Historical Society.

== History ==
In 1798, Samuel Cockayne came from the Annapolis, Maryland area and became one of the first European settlers in the Glen Dale area. At the time of his death in 1854, Samuel had acquired over 500 acres, which he split between his sons Bennett and Vincent. Bennett had acquired land north of his father's property previous to Samuel's death and built the current farmhouse around 1850, which was named "Glendale Farm" by Bennett's daughter-in-law Sarah. Bennett was the local postmaster for several years and had a school in his house in addition to farming. Vincent received the southern part of the holdings, which included Samuel's home, and called his farm "Valley Farm".

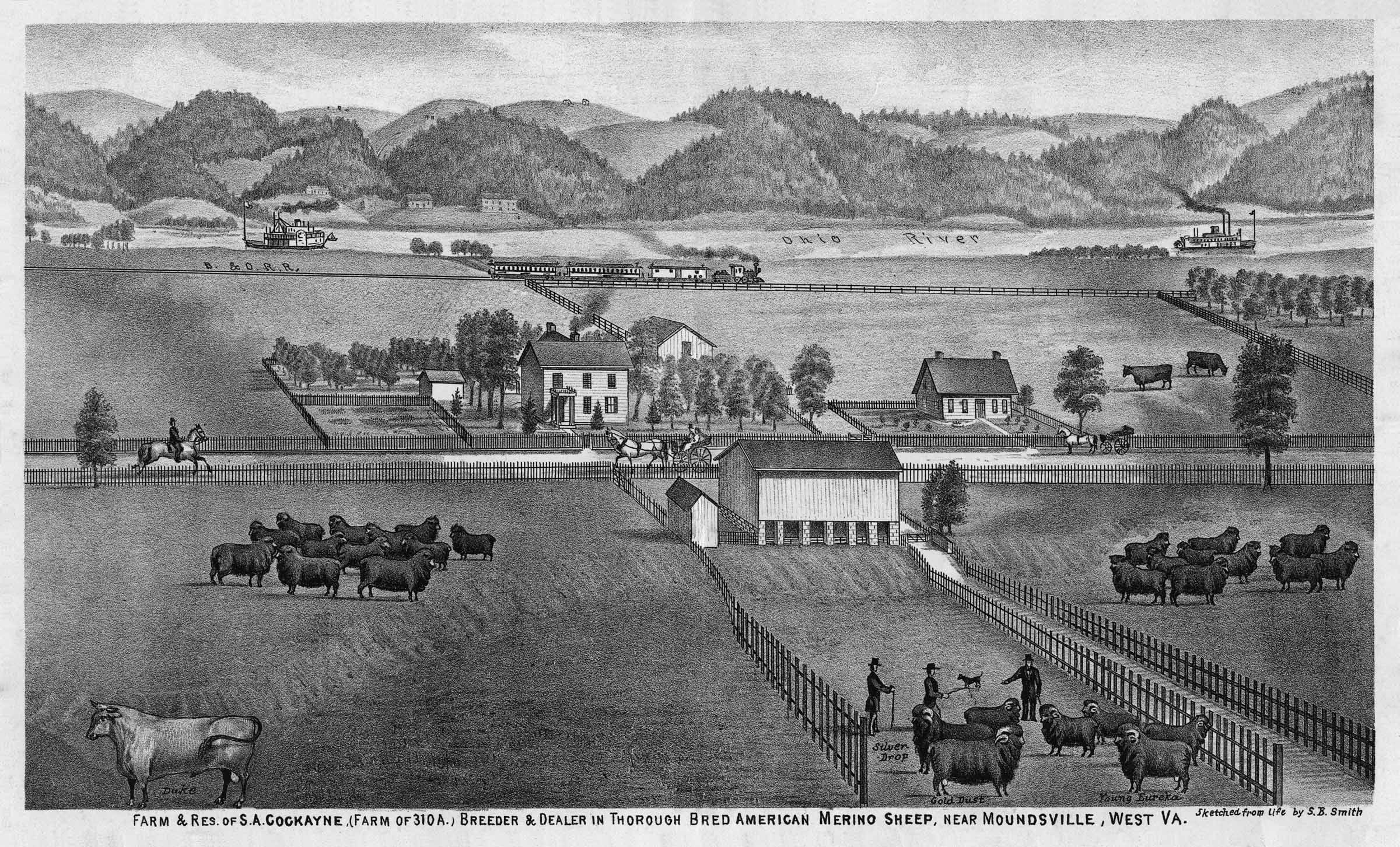
1877 Print showing Bennett Cockayne's farm along with Samuel A.J. Cockayne's house

It would be Bennett's son, Samuel A.J., who would bring worldwide attention to "Glendale Farm". Samuel A.J. started a Merino sheep flock in the 1860s and began a breeding program to achieve the finest quality wool. His efforts paid off in 1876 when he won a medal and certificate "for fine Merino ram wool" at the Centennial Exposition in Philadelphia and in 1878 when he won recognition for his wool at the Exposition Universelle in Paris.

Samuel A. Cockayne "Zan" inherited the farm next. Samuel A. also supplemented his income as the postmaster of Glen Dale and as a member of the Washington district school board. Upon his death in 1953, the farm passed to Samuel A.J. Cockayne. Samuel A.J. served in the Pacific Theater in World War II. Upon his return, he devoted his life to the farm. After selling most of the farm land to the school district for a new high school in 1967, Samuel A.J. lived a reclusive lifestyle until his death in 2001.

== Restoration ==
=== Exterior ===
Upon taking possession of the house in early 2002, it became evident to city and county leaders that the Cockayne House could become a unique historical resource in the area. Samuel A.J. had lived in only the back two rooms of the house and Sam had only added very rudimentary electric and running water. Heating in the house remained the wood-burning stove. With the house essentially being a time capsule, city and county leaders decided to lease the house to the Marshall County Historical Society, with that organization creating the Cockayne Farm Preservation Project. This project would restore not only the exterior and structure of the house, but would preserve the interior and the material culture found within. While a restoration analysis was being completed, an archaeological survey was undertaken and all of the objects in the house were reviewed by a curator and cataloged.

In order to adequately preserve and restore the house, the exterior was determined to be the first priority. Through grants, contributions, and volunteer hours, money and support for the project grew. Fortunately, upon completion of a study on the needs of the house, the structural integrity of the house was considered to be good. However, major projects would need to be undertaken to return the house to its appearance in the later 1800s/early 1900s as well as to keep the house in good shape for the future. A new slate roof was determined to be the most pressing need, with this being completed in 2004. During the work on the roof, the slate was shown to be so deteriorated that it crumbled and turned to dust under the workers feet. Once the roof was replaced, the front porch was restored and rebuilt. By 2009 enough funding had been secured to allow for the restoration and painting of the exterior. In 2010, the contributing outbuilding behind the farmhouse was restored.

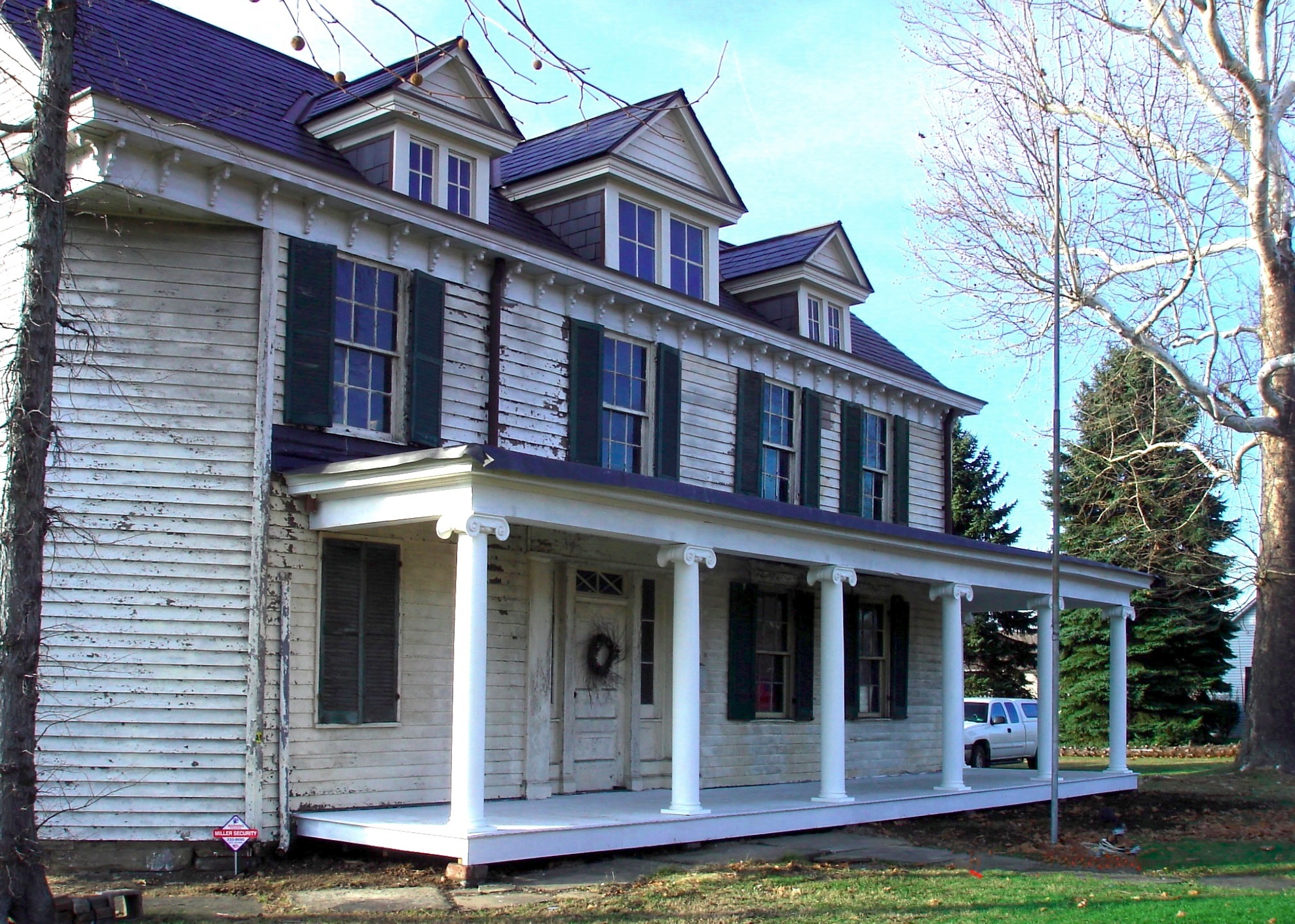
Cockayne House in 2002

=== Interior ===
Finding a large number of objects and material culture items, the first priority for preservation work inside the house was weatherproofing the house through the renovation process. As this work progressed, items were found that proved to be important for the story of the Cockaynes and for Marshall County history. One such find was a school roster and other papers that showed that the farmhouse was the site of the first schoolhouse in Glen Dale. Wallpaper throughout the house, while deteriorated, yielded a vast amount of information about how each of the rooms looked in the late 1800s/early 1900s. Part of this information was finding the different layers of wallpaper and trying to establish when redecorating took place. In keeping with the Projects goals, the wallpapers will be professionally cleaned and stabilized in order for visitors to get the sense of what the actual papers looked like. While this process is in the early phases, the scope can be seen by looking at not only the layers of dust, but the accumulation of coal and wood smoke residue built up through the daily usage of the house. While not accumulated upon each other like the wallpaper, the carpeting yielded not only evidence as to a rooms look but also yielded several paper records, pictures, newspapers that were kept underneath. If not touched by water damage, these artifacts were in good condition since they were stored flat and were not in direct sunlight or airflow. All of the objects, including the carpeting were needed to be removed in 2012 as a geothermal climate control system will be installed in 2013. The system will be hidden from the visitors experience and will be as minimally invasive as possible, using the chimneys as well as the attic and cellar to house critical units.

=== Mound ===
Behind and to the west of the farmhouse is an Indian Burial Mound. It appears that the Cockayne family protected the mound over the years; however at some point the land it occupies was sold. In 2005 the mound was acquired by the Cockayne Farm Preservation Project to preserve this Native American mound for future educational programs. Archaeological studies have shown that the mound is similar to other mounds in the area. There are no plans to perform any archeological work that would disturb any objects that are buried within.

== Education ==
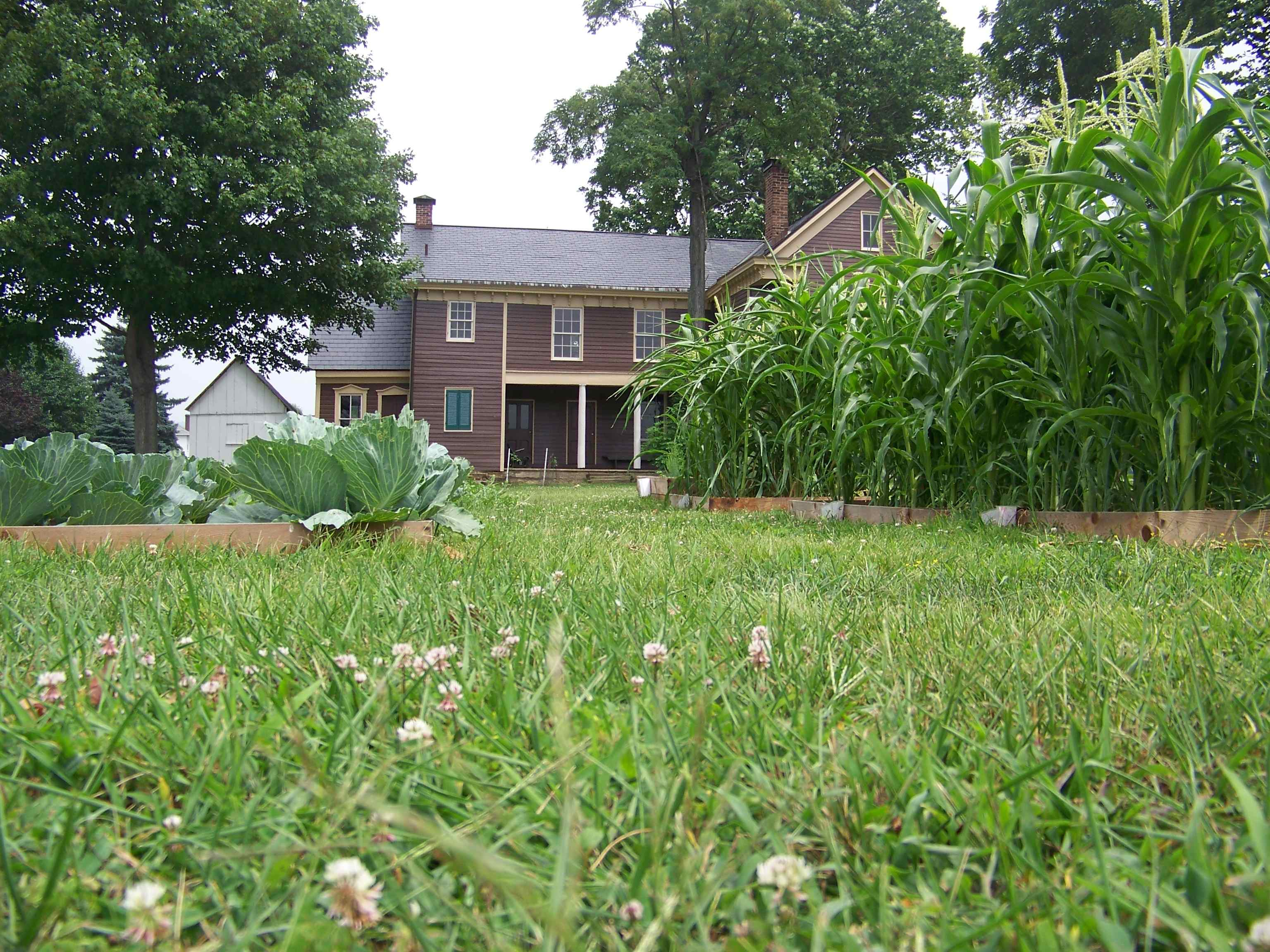
Garden at Cockayne Farm

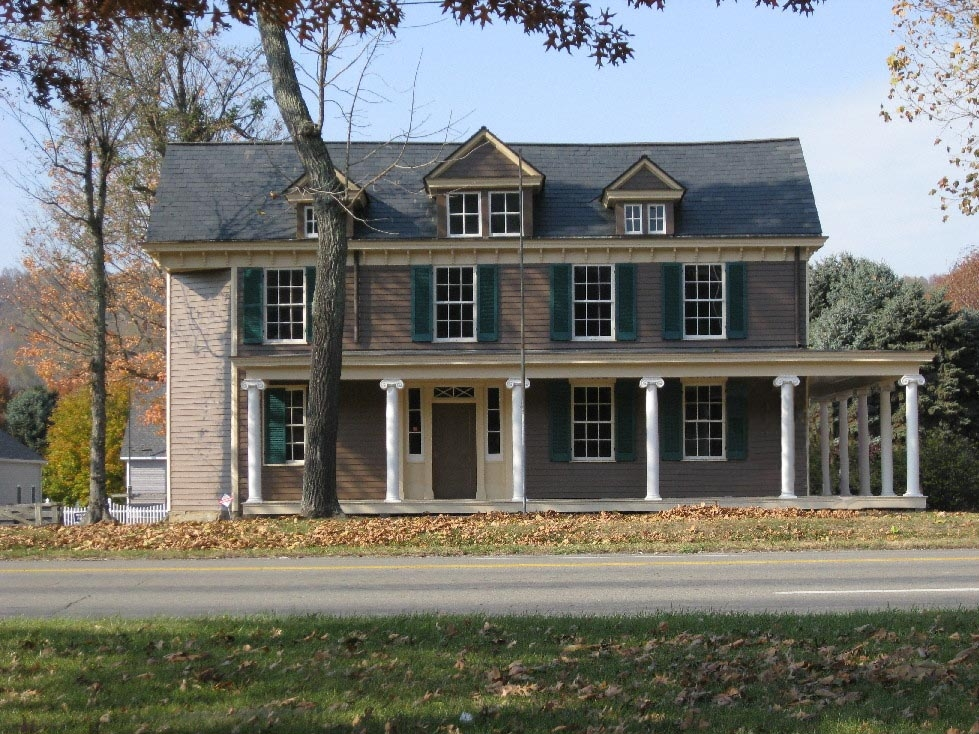
Cockayne House 2013

Since the start of the Cockayne Farm Preservation Project, education has been vitally important. The leadership of the preservation project has been able to form strategic alliances with West Virginia University, Wheeling Jesuit University, Belmont Technical College, and John Marshall High School. These partnerships have allowed the Project to gain materials and expertise at little cost while providing students with hands-on experience. John Marshall High School, which is situated across from the farmstead, has had multiple projects that has furthered the mission of the Preservation Project. Initially the advanced art class donated art work to be sold to benefit the Cockayne Farm Project while an AP English class project designed a brochure. For the past few years the FFA club has designed, planted, and maintained a series of raised beds on the farm. Produce grown on site is then used at the high school. Long term plans for the Cockayne Farm Preservation Project include a large educational component that will foster learning projects between schools and the farm as well as educational opportunities for people of all ages.

West Virginia University has had several interns assist with material culture projects in the Public History/Cultural Resource Management programs. The farm has also been a site used by the Interior Design department, as they were able to scan and create 3D models of the interior and objects for future study. Technology was also the focus for the Landscape Architecture Department when a 3D computerized model was created for a future landscape plan. (See external link below to view 3D LiDAR animation of the site) A curriculum and instructional design class from Wheeling Jesuit University used the farmstead as a basis to construct a series of four lessons that could be used with different age groups and meet the WV Department of Education standards. Lastly, a class from the Building Preservation and Restoration Program at Belmont Technical College were able to have a hands-on learning experience through the restoration of the outbuilding behind the house. The experience allowed students to practice what they have learned in real conditions. Among these real conditions was the reality that some of the structure was significantly more damaged that first thought.
