= Raymond Price House =

Historic house in South Carolina, United States

- U.S. National Register of Historic Places
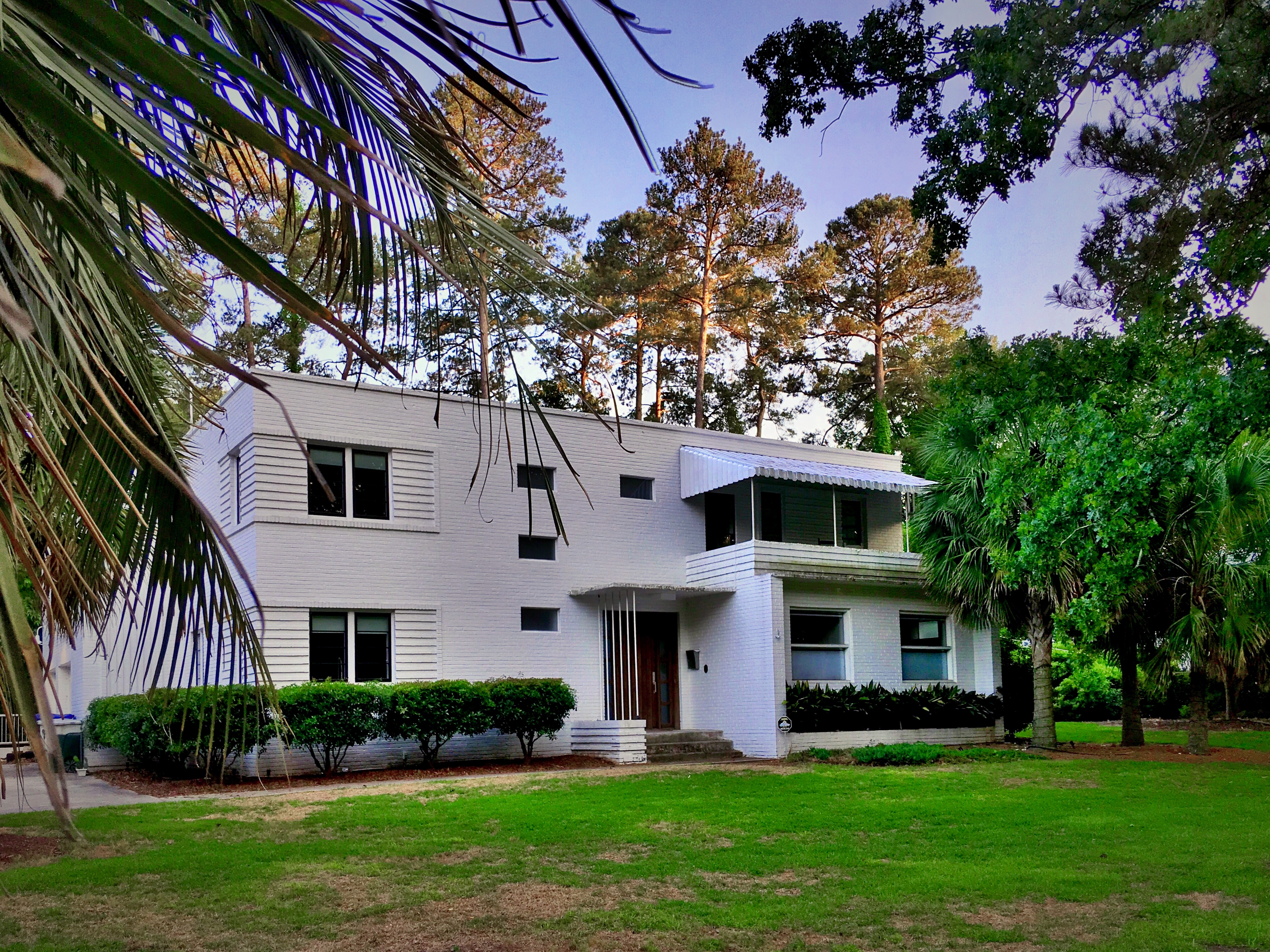

- Location within South Carolina Location within the United States
- Location: 3004 Forest Dr. Columbia, South Carolina
- Coordinates: 34°0′55″N 80°59′52″W
- Area: less than one acre
- Built: 1952
- Built by: Price, George R.
- Architectural style: Moderne, International Style
- NRHP reference No.: 07001022
- Added to NRHP: September 27, 2007

Raymond Price House is a historic home located at Columbia, South Carolina. It was built in 1952, and is a two-story, L-shaped, steel-framed, masonry dwelling in the Streamline Moderne / International style. It has a flat roof and front and rear balconies. Also on the property is a one-story structure that is now an office.

It was added to the National Register of Historic Places in 2007.
