= Ferrell-Holt House =

Historic house in West Virginia, United States

- U.S. National Register of Historic Places
- U.S. Historic district – Contributing property
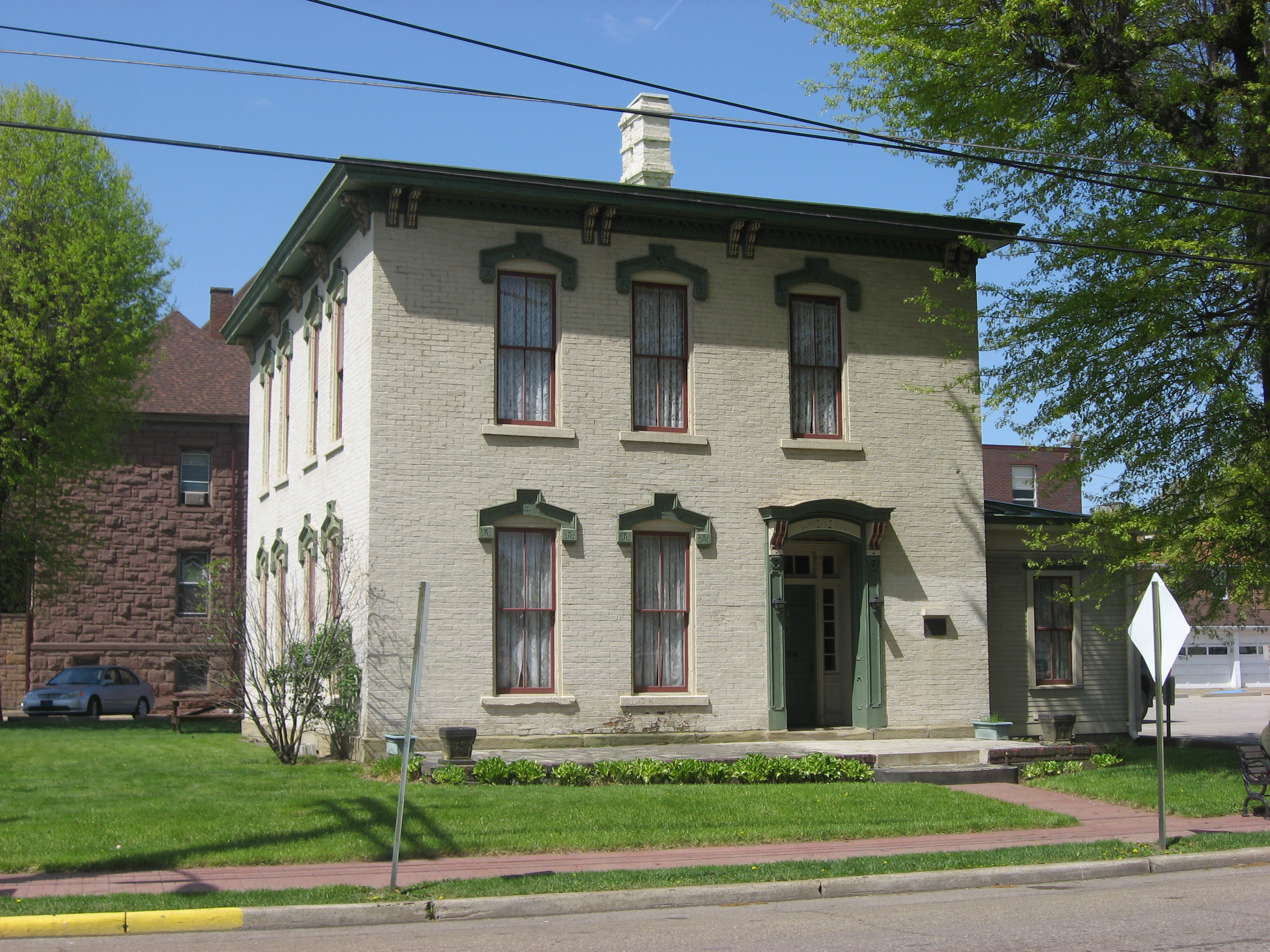
- Front and southern side of the house

- Location within West Virginia Location within the United States
- Location: 609 Jefferson Ave., Moundsville, West Virginia
- Coordinates: 39°55′8″N 80°44′52″W
- Area: 0.8 acres (0.32 ha)
- Built: 1877
- Architectural style: Italianate
- NRHP reference No.: 86003678
- Added to NRHP: February 3, 1987

Ferrell-Holt House, also known as "Kirkside," is a historic home located at Moundsville, Marshall County, West Virginia. It was built in 1877, and is a two-story masonry dwelling in the Italianate style.

It was listed on the National Register of Historic Places in 1987. It is located in the Moundsville Commercial Historic District, designated in 1998.
