= Glen Dale, West Virginia =

City in West Virginia, US

- Town
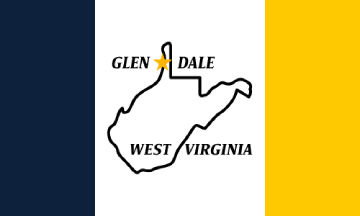
- Flag Seal
- Motto: Montani Semper Liberi
- Location of Glen Dale in Marshall County, West Virginia.
- Coordinates: 39°56′55″N 80°45′18″W
- Country: United States
- State: West Virginia
- County: Marshall
- Incorporated: 1924

Area
  - Total: 1.20 sq mi (3.11 km^{2})
  - Land: 0.85 sq mi (2.20 km^{2})
  - Water: 0.35 sq mi (0.91 km^{2})
- Elevation: 692 ft (211 m)

Population (2020)
  - Total: 1,496
  - Estimate (2021): 1,486
  - Density: 1,613.3/sq mi (622.89/km^{2})
- Time zone: UTC-5 (Eastern (EST))
  - Summer (DST): UTC-4 (EDT)
- ZIP code: 26038
- Area code: 304/681
- FIPS code: 54-31492
- GNIS feature ID: 1560592
- Website: www.glendalewv.gov

Glen Dale is a city in Marshall County, West Virginia, United States, along the Ohio River. It is part of the Wheeling metropolitan area. The population was 1,514 at the 2020 census. Glen Dale was incorporated in 1924. It is in the northwest part of the county, which is above the Mason–Dixon line and forms the base of the Northern Panhandle of West Virginia.

== History ==
The city was named after Glendale, the farm of a local family.

== Demographics ==
Historical population
Census	Pop.	Note	%±
1930	1,493		—
1940	1,348		−9.7%
1950	1,467		8.8%
1960	1,905		29.9%
1970	2,150		12.9%
1980	1,875		−12.8%
1990	1,612		−14.0%
2000	1,552		−3.7%
2010	1,526		−1.7%
2020	1,496		−2.0%
2021 (est.)	1,486		−0.7%
U.S. Decennial Census

=== 2020 census ===
As of the 2020 census, Glen Dale had a population of 1,496. The median age was 50.4 years. 18.2% of residents were under the age of 18 and 27.5% of residents were 65 years of age or older. For every 100 females there were 91.1 males, and for every 100 females age 18 and over there were 89.8 males age 18 and over.

100.0% of residents lived in urban areas, while 0.0% lived in rural areas.

There were 687 households in Glen Dale, of which 23.6% had children under the age of 18 living in them. Of all households, 49.3% were married-couple households, 16.2% were households with a male householder and no spouse or partner present, and 29.4% were households with a female householder and no spouse or partner present. About 29.6% of all households were made up of individuals and 15.4% had someone living alone who was 65 years of age or older.

There were 745 housing units, of which 7.8% were vacant. The homeowner vacancy rate was 0.6% and the rental vacancy rate was 10.8%.

Racial composition as of the 2020 census
Race	Number	Percent
White	1,407	94.1%
Black or African American	9	0.6%
American Indian and Alaska Native	4	0.3%
Asian	10	0.7%
Native Hawaiian and Other Pacific Islander	0	0.0%
Some other race	7	0.5%
Two or more races	59	3.9%
Hispanic or Latino (of any race)	25	1.7%

=== 2010 census ===
As of the census of 2010, there were 1,526 people, 688 households and 475 families living in the city. The population density was 1,795.3 inhabitants per square mile (693.2/km^{2}). There were 745 housing units at an average density of 876.5 per square mile (338.4/km^{2}). The racial makeup of the city was 97.5% White, 0.1% African American, 0.5% Native American, 0.4% Asian, 0.4% from other races, and 1.0% from two or more races. Hispanic or Latino of any race were 1.0% of the population.

There were 688 households, of which 23.1% had children under the age of 18 living with them, 52.6% were married couples living together, 11.6% had a female householder with no husband present, 4.8% had a male householder with no wife present, and 31.0% were non-families. 28.1% of all households were made up of individuals, and 14.5% had someone living alone who was 65 years of age or older. The average household size was 2.22 and the average family size was 2.65.

The median age in the city was 50 years. 17.1% of residents were under the age of 18; 6.7% were between the ages of 18 and 24; 19.3% were from 25 to 44; 33.8% were from 45 to 64; and 23.1% were 65 years of age or older. The gender makeup of the city was 46.9% male and 53.1% female.

=== 2000 census ===
As of the census of 2000, there were 1,552 people, 697 households and 469 families living in the city. The population density was 1,940.8 per square mile (749.0/km^{2}). There were 757 housing units at an average density of 946.6 per square mile (365.3/km^{2}). The racial makeup of the city was 98.65% White, 1.96% African American, 0.32% Asian, 0.26% from other races, and 0.71% from two or more races. Hispanic or Latino of any race were 0.08% of the population.

There were 697 households, of which 24.1% had children under the age of 18 living with them, 56.7% were married couples living together, 9.0% had a female householder with no husband present, and 32.6% were non-families. 30.4% of all households were made up of individuals, and 18.7% had someone living alone who was 65 years of age or older. The average household size was 2.23 and the average family size was 2.75.

In the town the population was spread out, with 19.3% under the age of 18, 5.9% from 18 to 24, 23.0% from 25 to 44, 28.1% from 45 to 64, and 23.7% who were 65 years of age or older. The median age was 46 years. For every 100 females, there were 87.7 males. For every 100 females age 18 and over, there were 83.6 males.

The median income for a household in the town was $40,000, and the median income for a family was $49,306. Males had a median income of $40,352 versus $25,588 for females. The per capita income for the city was $24,409. About 5.4% of families and 6.5% of the population were below the poverty line, including 6.9% of those under age 18 and 9.6% of those age 65 or over.

== Geography ==
Glen Dale is located at 39°56′55″N 80°45′18″W (39.948594, -80.754922).

According to the United States Census Bureau, the city has a total area of 1.20 square miles (3.11 km^{2}), of which 0.85 square miles (2.20 km^{2}) is land and 0.35 square miles (0.91 km^{2}) is water.

== Parks and recreation ==
Glen Dale is a qualified Tree City USA as recognized by the National Arbor Day Foundation.

== Notable people ==
Glen Dale is the home town of:

- Brad Paisley, country music singer
- Lionel Cartwright, country music singer
- Shelley Moore Capito, U.S. senator for West Virginia
- Arch A. Moore, Jr, governor of West Virginia
- Shelley Riley Moore, former First Lady of West Virginia
- George Brett, member of Baseball Hall of Fame, born in Glen Dale, primarily raised in Southern California
- Jeffrey V. Kessler, West Virginia state senator (November 1997 – 2017); West Virginia Senate president (January 2011 – 2015)
- Bernice E. Eddy, virologist and epidemiologist
- Josh Pastner, college basketball coach at Georgia Tech
- Larry Frank, racing driver

== See also ==
- Cockayne Farm Preservation Project
