= Acacia Lodge =

Historic house in California, United States

- U.S. National Register of Historic Places
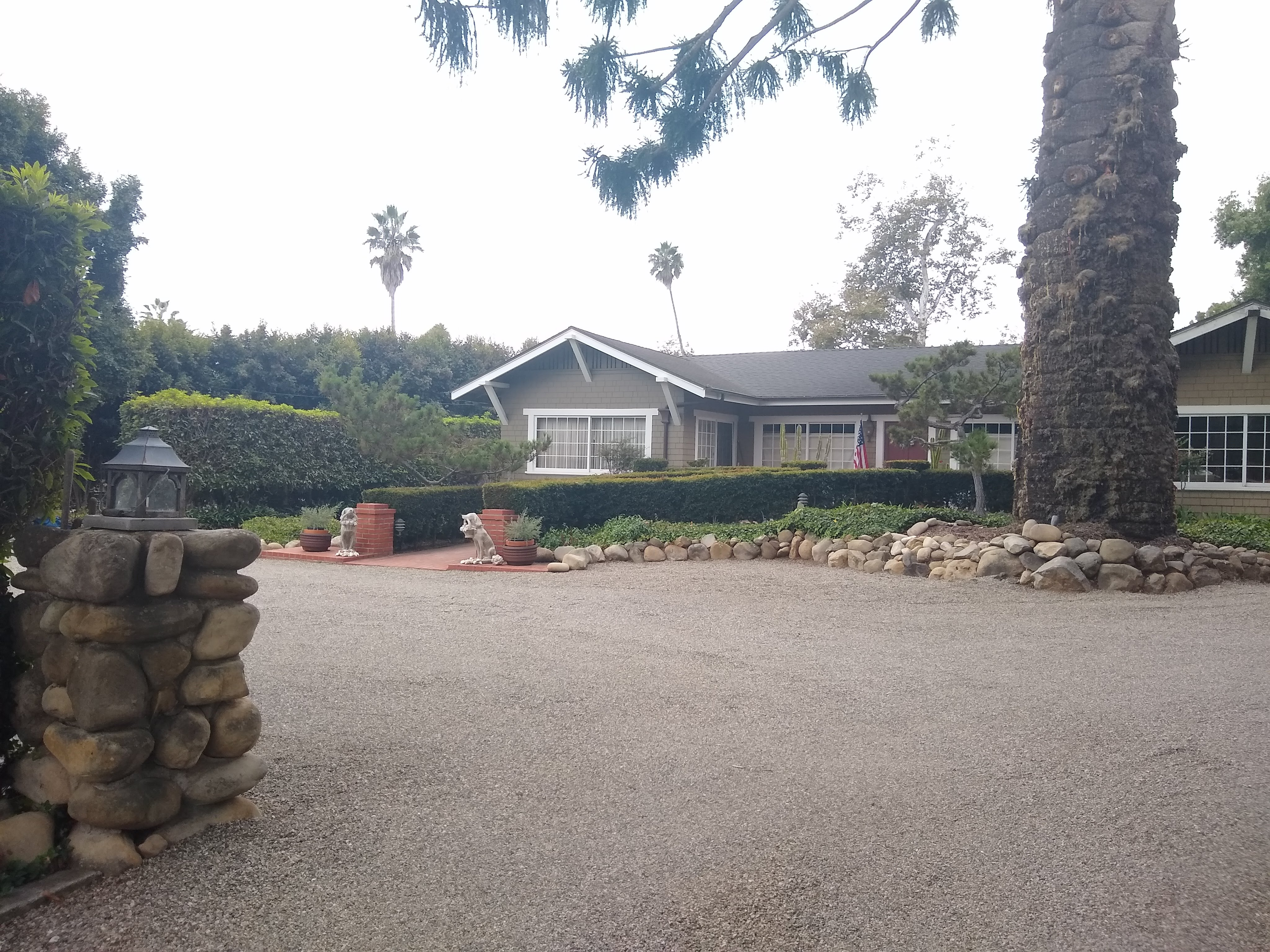

- Location within California Location within the United States
- Location: 109 Miramar Ave., Montecito, California
- Coordinates: 34°25′22″N 119°37′49″W
- Built: 1917
- Architect: William A. Whittlesey Brownell
- Architectural style: Bungalow/craftsman
- NRHP reference No.: 97000750
- Added to NRHP: July 9, 1997

Acacia Lodge, also known as the Shourds-Price House, is a craftsman style home in Montecito near the City of Santa Barbara, California that is significant for its architecture and landscape design. It was built in 1917 as a rental lodge.

The property was listed on the National Register of Historic Places (NRHP) in 1997.

Per its nomination document,

The building was constructed in 1917 by William Augustus Whittlesey Brownell, a local designer, building, and developer who developed a number of rental properties in the area of Acacia Lodge. Brownell designed each house inside and out, furnished each to the smallest detail, sited each to take advantage of mountain scenery, laid out the grounds, and choose and planted all flowers, trees, and shrubs from his own nursery. Acacia Lodge embodies the Arts and Crafts ideals of total, integrated design; unity with nature; and simple, clean, cozy, private living.

The house is distinguished as a cross between a traditional Craftsman house and a ranch, with large windows that open and close and that provide significantly more light inside than is normal for Craftsman homes.

Before its NRHP nomination, the property was nominated for listing in a local historic registry but the registry declined. The owner was subsequently invited to nominate the property for NRHP listing, which went through. The home is privately owned and not open to the public.

== W.A.W. Brownell ==
William Augustus Whittlesey (W.A.W.) Brownell (died 1932) was a local architect and developer who practiced in Montecito for 25 years. He had earlier worked as a carpenter, including for the Southern Pacific Railroad.

His mother, Sylvia Brownell, and W.A.W. "built many of the houses in the area for investment purposes, to appeal to Easterners who were seeking the good climate year round or seasonally." At least eight houses are definitely attributed to Brownell:

- Sylvia Brownell's home
- W.A.W. Brownell's home (135 Miramar)
- Wylbron Lodge,
- Beverly Lodge,
- Sylvan Lodge
- Warren Lodge
- "the Studio"
- "the Little Home"

An additional seven are identified as likely works, because of similarities in architecture and proximity:

- Acacia Lodge
- Bungar Lodge (since modified significantly)
- Frink Lodge
- Hayes-Jaffray House
- Hope Lodge
- Mon Desir (since modified significantly)
- Ethel M. Shaw House

Two houses, the J.N. Hull and Katenkamp houses, have been moved to other locations.
