= Bushrod Washington Price House =

Historic house in West Virginia, United States

- U.S. National Register of Historic Places
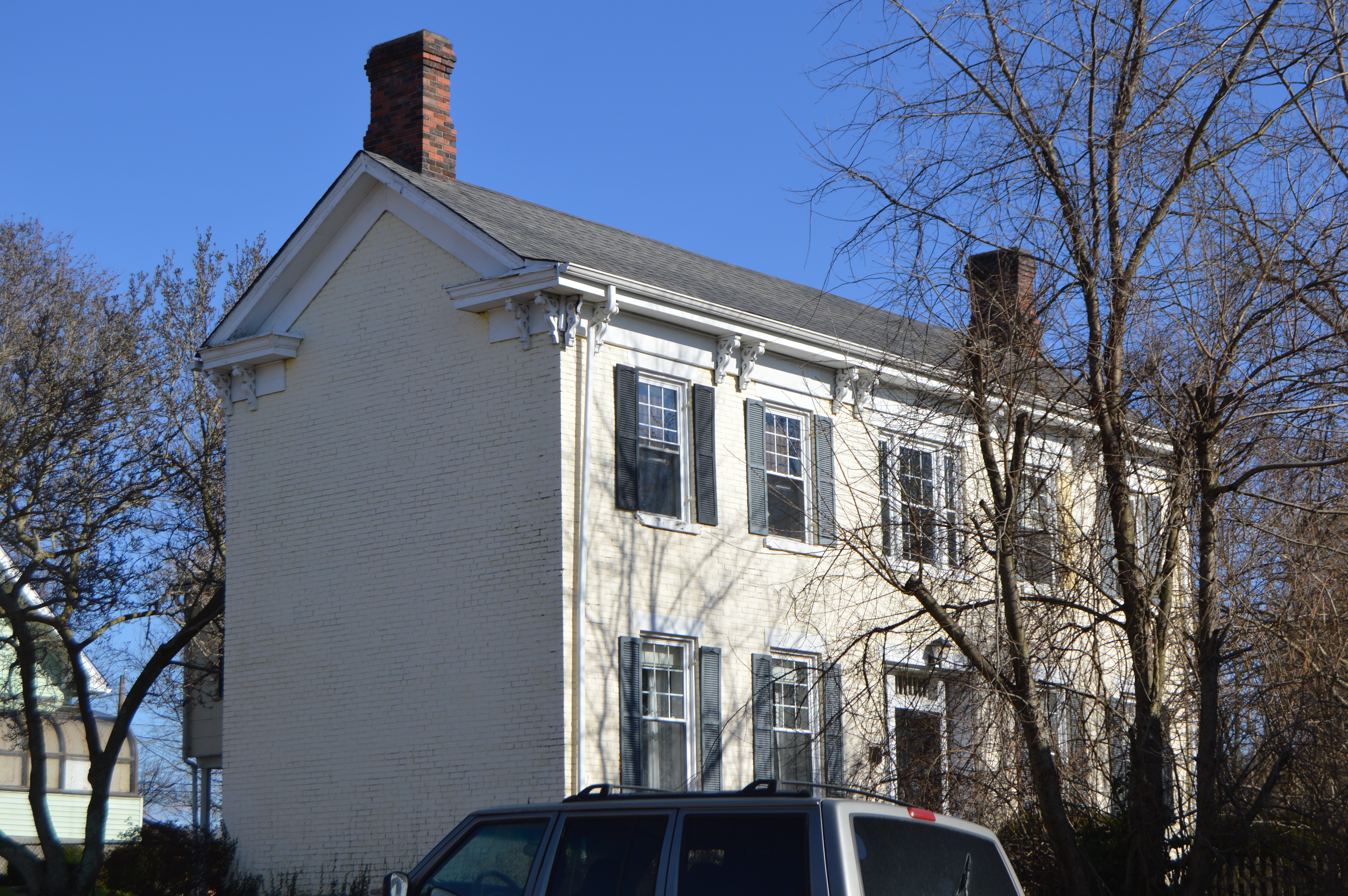
- Front and northern end

- Location within West Virginia Location within the United States
- Location: 1803 Virginia St., Moundsville, West Virginia
- Coordinates: 39°55′22″N 80°43′59″W
- Area: less than one acre
- Architectural style: I-House
- NRHP reference No.: 95001326
- Added to NRHP: November 22, 1995

Bushrod Washington Price House, also known as the Price-Burley House, is a historic home located at Moundsville, Marshall County, West Virginia. It was built about 1830, and is a five-bay, L-shaped brick dwelling in a Greek Revival / I-house style.

It was listed on the National Register of Historic Places in 1995.
