= Bruce Nissen =

American historian (born 1948)

Bruce Nissen (born January 20, 1948) is an American professor emeritus of labor studies and director of research at the Center for Labor Research and Studies (CLRS) at Florida International University (FIU). He also formerly directed that university's Research Institute on Social and Economic Policy (RISEP).

== Childhood and education ==
Nissen was born in Ames, Iowa, 1948 to Raymond and Irene Nissen.

He obtained a bachelor's degree in philosophy and psychology from Grinnell College in 1970, a master's degree in labor studies from Rutgers University and a Ph.D. from Columbia University in 1975 entitled "Moral Means and Ends in Social Change: Dewey and Marxism".

He married Karen Lieberman in 1978. They have two sons.

== Career ==
Nissen was appointed an assistant professor of labor studies at Indiana University-Purdue University at Indianapolis in 1981. In 1985, Nissen became an associate professor of labor studies at Indiana University Northwest.

Nissen joined the Center for Labor Research and Studies at Florida International University in 1997. His wife, Karen Lieberman, has retired from a professorship in the Hospitality College at the North Miami campus of Johnson & Wales University.

== Research ==
Nissen's research focuses on a wide variety of topics regarding workers and the U.S. labor movement.

Early in his career he focused on the impact and dissemination of the "new labor history" in labor studies as well as its impact on labor education in higher education and labor unions themselves. His early work also centered on theories of the labor movement, enterprise zones, plant closings, labor-community coalitions confronting plant closings, the nature of a labor-management "accord" in the post-World War II years in the U.S. and similar topics.

His later research looks at living wage campaigns, labor-community coalitions, the future direction of the U.S. labor movement, unions and workplace reorganization, unions operating in a globalized environment, unions facing "union busting," and the like.

In November 2001, he criticized economist Arthur Laffer (recently appointed an advisor to Florida Governor-elect Rick Scott), saying Laffer's economic theory "basically doesn't hold water".

== Memberships and awards ==
In 2011 Nissen won the Lifetime Achievement Award from the United Association for Labor Education (UALE). This is the highest award given in the field of labor education. In 2004 he won the Florida International University “Excellence in Research” award. This is the highest yearly research award given by the university.

Nissen is a member of the United Association for Labor Education, and has served on the executive board of the organization. He is past secretary-treasurer of the Labor and Labor Movements section of the American Sociological Association (ASA). He has also served on numerous boards and commissions in his local community (such as the Community Coalition for a Living Wage and the South Florida chapter of Jobs with Justice) and has served as an adviser and researcher for city, county and state government entities as well as labor unions and community organizations.

Nissen was also an editor of Labor Studies Journal for eight years, from 2000 through 2008.

== Selected publications ==
=== Authored books ===
- Fighting for Jobs: Case Studies of Labor-Community Coalitions Confronting Plant Closings. Albany, N.Y.: State University of New York Press, 1995. ISBN 0-7914-2567-3
- Lieberman, Karen and Nissen, Bruce. Ethics in the Hospitality and Tourism Industry, second edition. Lansing, Mich.: Educational Institute, 2008. ISBN 978-0-86612-328-0

=== Edited volumes ===
- Larson, Simeon and Nissen, Bruce, eds. Theories of the Labor Movement. Detroit: Wayne State University Press, 1987. ISBN 0-8143-1815-0
- U.S. Labor Relations 1945-1989: Accommodation and Conflict. New York: Garland Publishing, 1990. ISBN 0-8240-7141-7
- Craypo, Charles and Nissen, Bruce, eds. Grand Designs: The Impact of Corporate Strategies on Workers, Unions and Communities. Ithaca, N.Y.: ILR Press, 1993. ISBN 0-87546-309-6
- Unions and Workplace Reorganization. Detroit: Wayne State University Press, 1997. ISBN 0-8143-2703-6
- Which Direction for Organized Labor? Essays on Organizing, Outreach, and Internal Transformation. Detroit: Wayne State University Press, 1999. ISBN 0-8143-2779-6
- Unions in a Globalized Environment: Changing Borders, Organizational Boundaries, and Social Roles. Armonk, N.Y.: M.E. Sharpe, Inc., 2002. ISBN 0-7656-0869-3

== See also ==
- Bruce Nissen, Center for Labor Research and Studies, Florida International University
- Who's Who in America. 58th ed. New Providence, NJ: Marquis Who's Who, 2004. ISBN 0-8379-6977-8
- Writers' Directory. 22nd ed. Farmington Hills, Mich.: Gale Group, 2007. ISBN 1-55862-598-4
