= West Virginia University =

Public university in Morgantown, West Virginia, US

- Former name: Agricultural College of West Virginia (1867–1868)
- Motto: Πίστει τὴν ἀρετήν, ἐν δὲ τῇ ἀρετῇ τὴν γνῶσιν (Koine Greek)
- Motto in English: "Add to your faith virtue; and to virtue, knowledge" (2 Peter 1:5 KJV)
- Type: Public land-grant research university
- Established: February 7, 1867; 159 years ago
- Accreditation: HLC
- Academic affiliations: CONAHEC; WVHEPC; space-grant
- Endowment: $889 million (FY2025)
- Budget: $1.27 billion (FY2026)
- President: Michael T. Benson
- Provost: Beverly Wendland
- Faculty: 1,222 (fall 2024)
- Students: 26,046 (fall 2025)
- Undergraduates: 20,964 (fall 2025)
- Postgraduates: 5,082 (fall 2025)
- Location: Morgantown, West Virginia, United States; 39.6458°N 79.9697°W
- Campus: 1,892 acres (7.66 km^{2}); Small city
- Other campuses: Beckley; Bridgeport; Charleston; Keyser; Martinsburg
- Newspaper: The Daily Athenaeum
- Colors: Old Gold and Blue
- Nickname: Mountaineers
- Sporting affiliations: NCAA Division I FBS - Big 12; SBC; CHMA
- Mascot: The Mountaineer
- Website: wvu.edu

West Virginia University (WVU) is a public land-grant research university with its main campus in Morgantown, West Virginia, United States. Its other campuses are those of the West Virginia University Institute of Technology in Beckley, West Virginia University Potomac State College in Keyser, and clinical campuses for the university's medical school at the Charleston Area Medical Center and Eastern Campus in Martinsburg. WVU Extension Service provides outreach with offices in all 55 West Virginia counties.

Enrollment for the fall 2025 semester was 23,532 for the main campus, while enrollment across all three campuses was 26,046. The Morgantown campus offers more than 350 bachelor's, master's, doctoral, and professional degree programs throughout 13 colleges and schools, including the West Virginia's only law and dental schools. Faculty and alumni include 27 Truman Scholars, 53 Goldwater Scholars, 116 Gilman Scholars, 82 Fulbright Scholars, 29 Boren Scholars, and 25 Rhodes Scholars, along with 41 National Science Foundation Graduate Research Fellowships.

== History ==
=== Establishment ===
WVU's Cadet Corps, c. 1880, from the site where Oglebay Hall is today. Martin Hall (center) and Woodburn Hall (right) are in the background.

Under the terms of the 1862 Morrill Land-Grant Colleges Act, the West Virginia Legislature created the "Agricultural College of West Virginia" on February 7, 1867, and the school officially opened on September 2 of the same year. On December 4, 1868, lawmakers renamed the college West Virginia University to represent a broader range of higher education. It's built on the grounds of three former academies, the Monongalia Academy of 1814, the Morgantown Female Academy of 1831, and Woodburn Female Seminary of 1858. Upon its founding, the local newspaper claimed that "a place more eligible for the quiet and successful pursuit of science and literature is nowhere to be found".

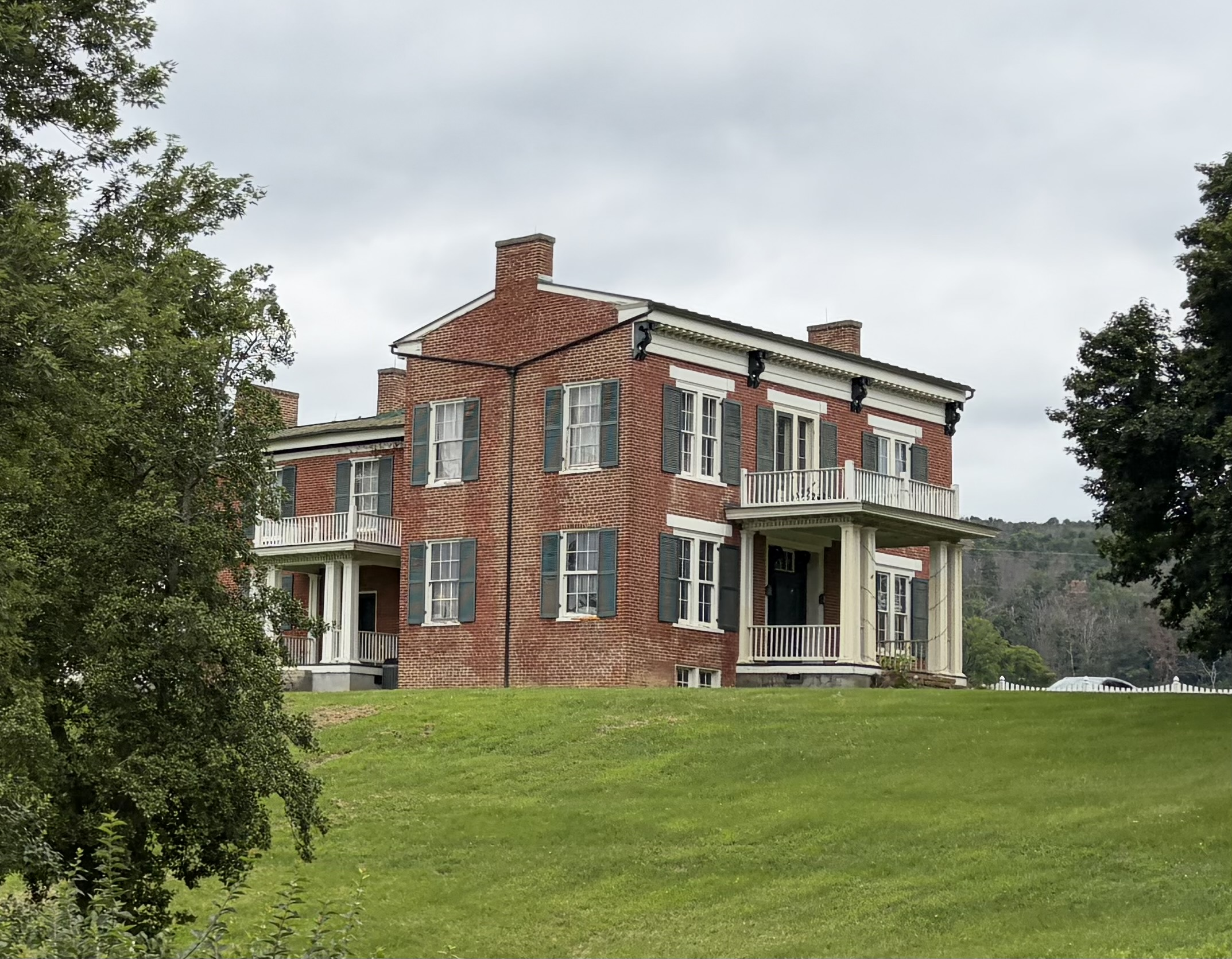
The main house at Reymann Memorial Farm, an agricultural unit of West Virginia University in Hardy County

The first campus building was constructed in 1870 as University Hall and was renamed Martin Hall in 1889 in honor of West Virginia University's first president, the Rev. Alexander Martin of Scotland. After a fire destroyed the Woodburn Seminary building in 1873, the centerpiece of what is now Woodburn Hall was completed in 1876, under the name New Hall. The name was changed to University Building in 1878 when the College of Law was founded as the first professional school in the state of West Virginia. The precursor to Woodburn Circle was finished in 1893 when Chitwood Hall (then Science Hall) was constructed on the bluff's north side. In 1909 a north wing was added to University Building, and the facility was renamed Woodburn Hall. Throughout the next decade, Woodburn Hall underwent several renovations and additions, including the construction of the south wing and east tower (in 1930) housing the Seth Thomas clock. The three Woodburn Circle buildings were listed on the National Register of Historic Places in 1974. In 1899, the Vance Farm was acquired for the West Virginia University Experiment Station. The Reymann Memorial Farm was given to West Virginia University in 1917 by the family of Anton Reymann of Wheeling in memory of Lawrence A. Reymann. The farm consisting of 990 acres located in Wardensville in Hardy County, comes until the Davis College of Agriculture.

WVU was required to have a Cadet Corps under the terms of the Morrill Act of 1862, which allowed for the creation of land-grant colleges. The United States Department of War—a predecessor of the U.S. Department of Defense—offered military equipment to the university at no charge, forming the basis of the school's Military Tactics department. The heavy military influence led to opposition of female enrollment that lasted through the first decade of the university. The trend changed in 1889 when ten women were allowed to enroll and seek degrees at the university. In June 1891, Harriet Lyon became the first (white) woman to receive a degree from West Virginia University, finishing first in the class ahead of all male students. Lyon's academic success supported the acceptance of women in the university as students and educators.

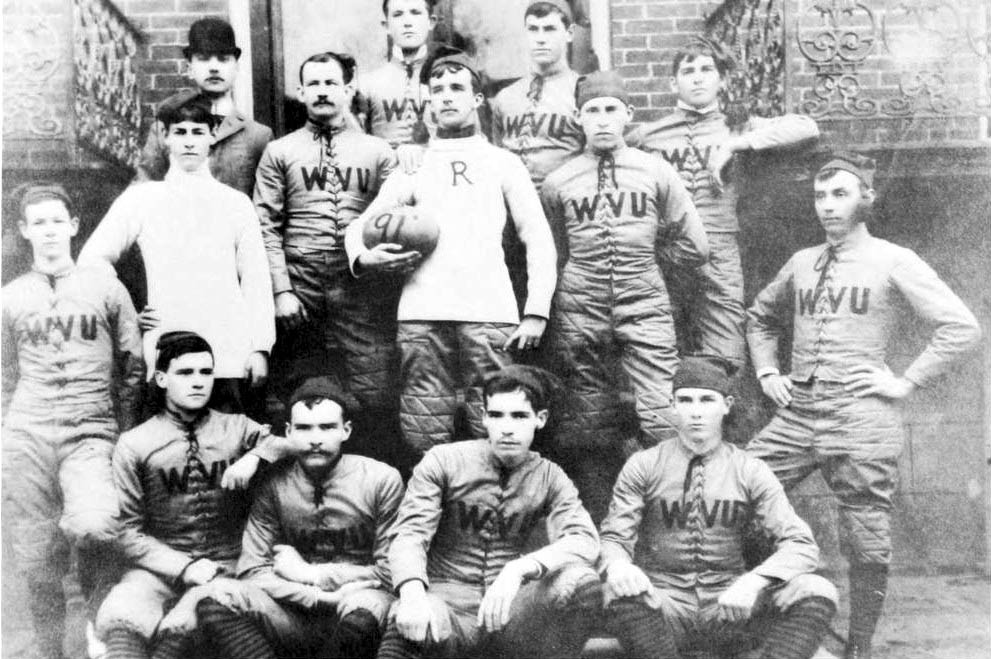
West Virginia University's first football team, formed in 1891

During the university's early years, daily chapel services and roll call for all students were mandatory, limiting time for student recreation. Following the removal of these obligations, students became active in extracurricular activities and established many of the school's first athletic and student organizations. The first edition of the student newspaper known as the Athenaeum, now The Daily Athenaeum, was published in 1887, and the West Virginia Law Review became the fourth-oldest law review in the United States when it was founded in 1894. In 1897, E. Eva Hubbard (1858–1947) became the first head of WVU's new Department of Art. Of Hubbard's students was renowned Modernist Blanche Lazzell. Phi Kappa Psi was the first fraternity on campus, founded May 23, 1890, while Kappa Delta, the first sorority at WVU, was established in 1899. The first football team was formed in 1891, and the first basketball team appeared in 1903.

=== Early 20th century ===
Boyd "Slim" Arnold, the first Mountaineer mascot to don the traditional buckskin uniform. His selection in 1937 marked the beginning of an official process to name the mascot annually.

The university's outlook at the turn of the 20th century was optimistic as the school constructed the first library in present-day Stewart Hall in 1902.

The campus welcomed U.S. President William Howard Taft to the campus for WVU President Thomas Hodges's inauguration in 1911. Taft delivered the address "World Wide Speech" from the front porch of Purinton House on November 2, 1911. However, the university's efforts to attract more qualified educators, increase enrollment, and expand the campus was hindered during a period that saw two World Wars and the Great Depression. With a heavy military influence in the university, many students left college to join the army during World War I, and the local ROTC was organized in 1916. Women's involvement in the war efforts at home led to the creation of Women's Hall dormitory, now Stalnaker Hall, in 1918.

Despite its wartime struggles, the university established programs in biology, medicine, journalism, pharmacy, and the first mining program in the nation. In 1918, Oglebay Hall was built to house the expanded agriculture and forestry programs. Additionally, the first dedicated sports facilities were constructed including "The Ark" for basketball in 1918 and the original Mountaineer Field in 1925. Stansbury Hall was built in 1928 and included a new basketball arena named "The Fieldhouse" that held 6,000 spectators. Elizabeth Moore Hall, the woman's physical education building, was also completed in 1928. Men's Hall, the first dormitory built for men on campus, was built in 1935 and was funded in part by the Works Progress Administration. The Mountaineer mascot (based on the mountain man) was adopted during the late 1920s, with an unofficial process to select the Mountaineer through 1936. An official selection process began naming the mascot annually in 1937, with Boyd "Slim" Arnold becoming the first Mountaineer to wear the buckskin uniform.

On March 16, 1922, West Virginia University was issued the state's first radio broadcasting license, for station WHD. The person primarily responsible for its establishment was Dr. Chauncey W. Waggoner, the head of the physics department. In late April, the projected schedule was announced as evenings, daily from 4 to 6 and 7 to 7:30 p.m., except for Sundays, when the schedule would be 10:45 to noon. The station was mainly used for experimental purposes, and made few entertainment and informational broadcasts. The university soon determined that the cost of running a broadcasting station exceeded its benefits, so WHD's license was allowed to expire, and it was deleted on November 19, 1923. In the early 1930s, a local commercial station, WMMN, established a studio in Morgantown, and assigned a daily 20 minute time slot to the university for its School of the Air programs.

=== Campus expansion ===
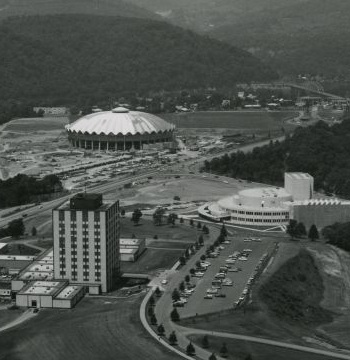
A view of the Evansdale campus and many new facilities constructed around 1970, including the iconic WVU Coliseum

As male students left for World War II in 1941–42, women became more prominent in the university and surpassed the number of men on campus for the first time in 1943. Soldiers returning from the war qualified for the G.I. Bill and helped increase enrollment to over 8,000 students for the first time but the university's facilities were becoming inadequate to accommodate the surging student population. Preparation for the baby boomer generation and plans for curriculum expansion led to the purchase of land for the Evansdale and Medical campuses. The growth of downtown Morgantown limited the space available on the original campus; the new site was nearly two miles north on what had been farmland. Beginning in the late 1950s the university experienced the most rapid period of growth in its history. In 1957, WVU opened a Medical Center on the new campus and founded the first school of dentistry in West Virginia. The basketball program reached a new level of success when the university admitted future 14‑time NBA All-Star and Hall of Fame player Jerry West, who led the team to the national championship game in 1959. As enrollment approached 14,000 in the 1960s, the university continued expansion plans by building the Evansdale Residential Complex to house approximately 1,800 students, the Mountainlair student union, and several engineering and the creative arts facility on the Evansdale campus. In 1970, the WVU Coliseum, a basketball facility with a capacity of 14,000, opened near the new campus. As the facilities expanded, the university researched ways to move its growing student population across the split campuses and to solve its worsening traffic congestion. The resulting Personal Rapid Transit system opened in 1973 as the world's first automated rapid transit system.

=== Post-expansion and 21st century ===
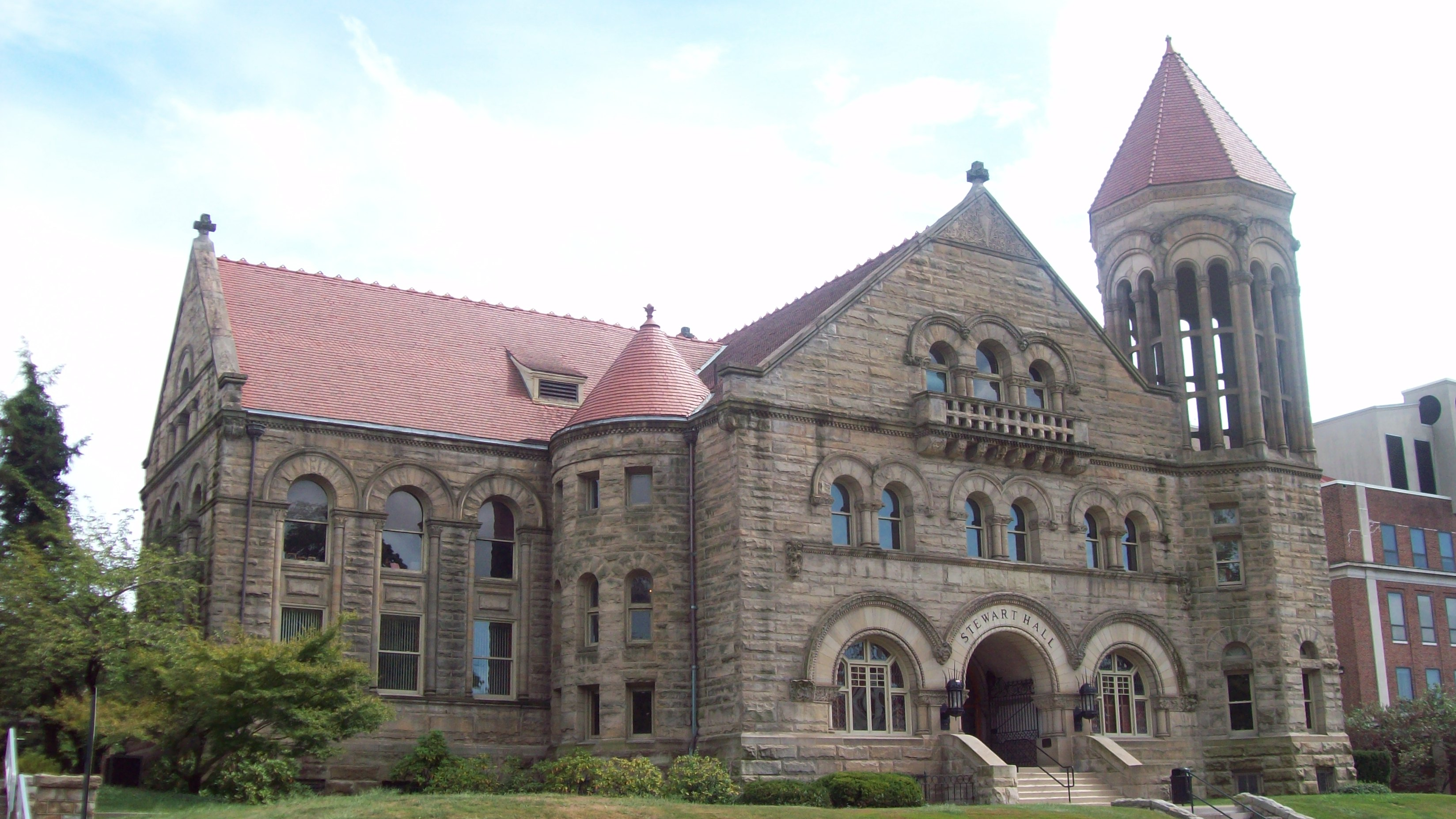
Stewart Hall is home to university administration and is one of the multiple campus buildings on the National Register of Historic Places.

The student population continued to grow in the late 1970s, reaching 22,000. With no room for growth on the downtown campus, the football stadium was closed, and the new Mountaineer Field was opened near the Medical campus on September 6, 1980. Mountaineer Field would later be named Mountaineer Field at Milan Puskar Stadium. After an $8 million donation to the university, Ruby Memorial Hospital opened on the Medical campus in 1988, providing the state's first level-one trauma center. Early the next year, the undefeated Mountaineer football team, led by Major Harris, made it to the national championship game before losing to Notre Dame in the Fiesta Bowl.

During the 1990s the university developed several recreational activities for students, including FallFest and WVU "Up All Night". While the programs were created to provide safe entertainment for students and to combat WVU's inclusion as one of the nation's top party schools, they also garnered national attention as solutions for reducing alcohol consumption and partying on college campuses across the country. In 2001, a $34 million, 177,000-square-foot (16,400 m^{2}) recreation facility opened on the Evansdale campus, providing students with exercise facilities, recreational activities, and personal training programs.

WVU reached a new level of athletic success to start the new millennium. The football team featured a 3‑0 BCS bowl record, ten consecutive bowl game appearances, a #1 ranking in the USA Today Coaches' Poll, three consecutive 11‑win seasons amassing a 33–5 record, 41 consecutive weeks in the top 25, and 6 conference championships. The men's basketball team won the 2007 NIT Championship and the 2010 Big East championship, while appearing four times in the sweet sixteen, twice in the elite-eight, and once in the final-four of the NCAA tournament. The athletic successes brought the university a new level of national exposure, and enrollment has since increased to nearly 30,000 students.

On April 24, 2008, the Pittsburgh Post-Gazette reported the university had improperly granted an MBA to Heather Bresch, the daughter of the state's governor Joe Manchin and an employee of Mylan, a pharmaceutical company whose then-chairman Milan Puskar was one of the university's largest donors. In the aftermath, the university determined Bresch's degree had been awarded without the prerequisite requirements having been met. They subsequently rescinded it, leading to the resignation of President Michael Garrison, provost Gerald Lang, and business school dean Steve Sears. Garrison had been profiled as a trend toward non-traditional university presidents by the Chronicle of Higher Education and Inside Higher Ed, but the faculty senate approved a vote of no confidence in the search that selected him. C. Peter McGrath was named interim president in August 2008. James P. Clements became WVU's 23rd president on June 30, 2009. He had previously served as provost at Towson University. On September 16, 2009, Michele G. Wheatly was named provost and vice president for Academic Affairs. In November 2013, James P. Clements was selected to be Clemson University's 15th president. E. Gordon Gee served as interim president; this was Gee's second time in this role, having first served as president of WVU in 1981.

On August 11, 2023, facing financial difficulties, university leaders proposed to cut 7% of the university's faculty and eliminate 32 major programs offered at the Morgantown campus. These cuts would affect some humanities disciplines, including the entire Department of World Language, Literature and Linguistics, as well as some non-humanities programs, such as pharmacy and engineering. Within the first week of fall classes, on August 21, 2023, hundreds of students staged a walkout and held rallies on Morgantown's Downtown and Evansdale campuses to show opposition to the proposal. Participants wore red in honor of the striking coal miners who fought in the Battle of Blair Mountain. The event was organized by the West Virginia United Students' Union, which began organizing in response to potential reductions and discontinuations while the program reviews were still in process. Shortly thereafter, the WVU Faculty Assembly approved a vote of "no confidence" in president Gee.

== Campus ==
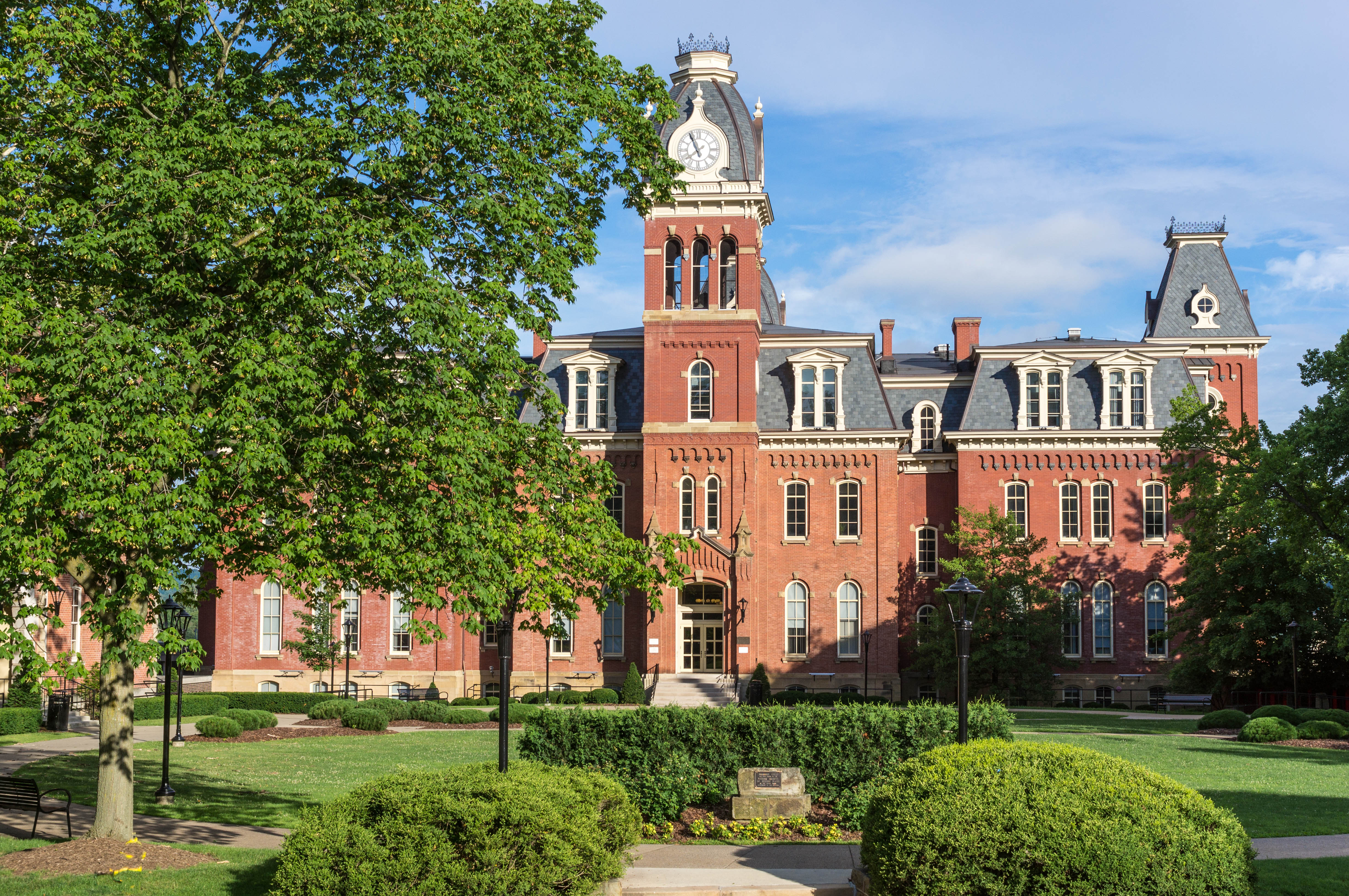
Woodburn Hall is one of the oldest buildings at West Virginia University, and has long been a symbol of the university.

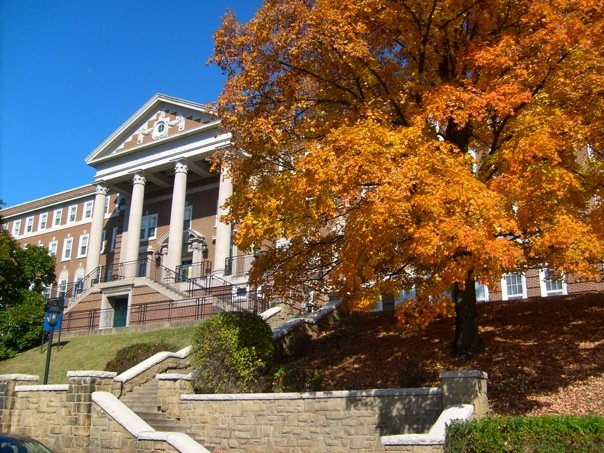
Stalnaker Hall is the oldest residence hall on campus.

The Morgantown campus comprises three sub-campuses. The original main campus, typically called the Downtown Campus, is in the Monongahela River valley on the fringes of downtown Morgantown. This part of the campus includes eight academic buildings on the National Register of Historic Places. The Downtown Campus comprises several architectural styles predominantly featuring red brick including Victorian Second Empire, Federal, Neoclassical, and Collegiate Gothic among others. The Evansdale Campus, a mile and a half north-northwest, on a rise above the flood plain of the Monongahela River, was developed in the 1950s and 1960s to accommodate a growing student population since space for expansion was limited at the Downtown Campus. The Health Sciences Campus, in the same outlying area (but on the other side of a ridge), includes the Robert C. Byrd Health Sciences Center, the Erma Byrd Biomedical Research Facility, Ruby Memorial Hospital, Chestnut Ridge Hospital, Mary Babb Randolph Cancer Center, WVU Healthcare Physicians Office Center, Rockefeller Neuroscience Institute, WVU Eye Institute, and the WVU Children's Hospital.

The Health Sciences Campus is near Mountaineer Field, over a ridge from the Evansdale Campus.

=== Core Arboretum ===
The Core Arboretum is a 91-acre (37 ha) arboretum owned by West Virginia University and on Monongahela Boulevard in Morgantown. It is open to the public daily without charge.

The arboretum's history began in 1948 when the university acquired its site. Professor Earl Lemley Core (1902–1984), chairman of the Biology Department, then convinced President Irvin Stewart to set the property aside for the study of biology and botany. In 1975 the arboretum was named in Core's honor.

The arboretum is now managed by the WVU Department of Biology and consists of mostly old-growth forests on steep hillside and Monongahela River floodplain. It includes densely wooded areas with 3.5 miles (5.6 km) of walking trails, as well as 3 acres (12,000 m^{2}) of lawn planted with specimen trees.

The arboretum has a variety of natural habitats in which hundreds of species of native West Virginia trees, shrubs, and herbaceous plants can be found.

=== Campus safety ===
The university created WVU Alert, a text-based alert system for quickly disseminating emergency situations to faculty, staff, and students. WVU also uses LiveSafe, a smart phone application that enables users to anonymously report crimes or safety concerns, or to use the walk safe feature which allows the user to invite a friend to monitor their location while they walk. Additionally, there are 37, easily accessible, blue-lit towers housing emergency phones across the WVU campuses that automatically dial 911 in the event of an emergency.

The West Virginia University Police Department (UPD) is the largest campus police department in the state and the only campus law enforcement agency in the state accredited by the International Association of Campus Law Enforcement Administrators. The UPD has a sworn officer operations division, a central communication unit, a student cadet unit, investigations, K-9 teams and other support services. Officers have the same authority and powers as city and county police officers.

=== Transportation ===
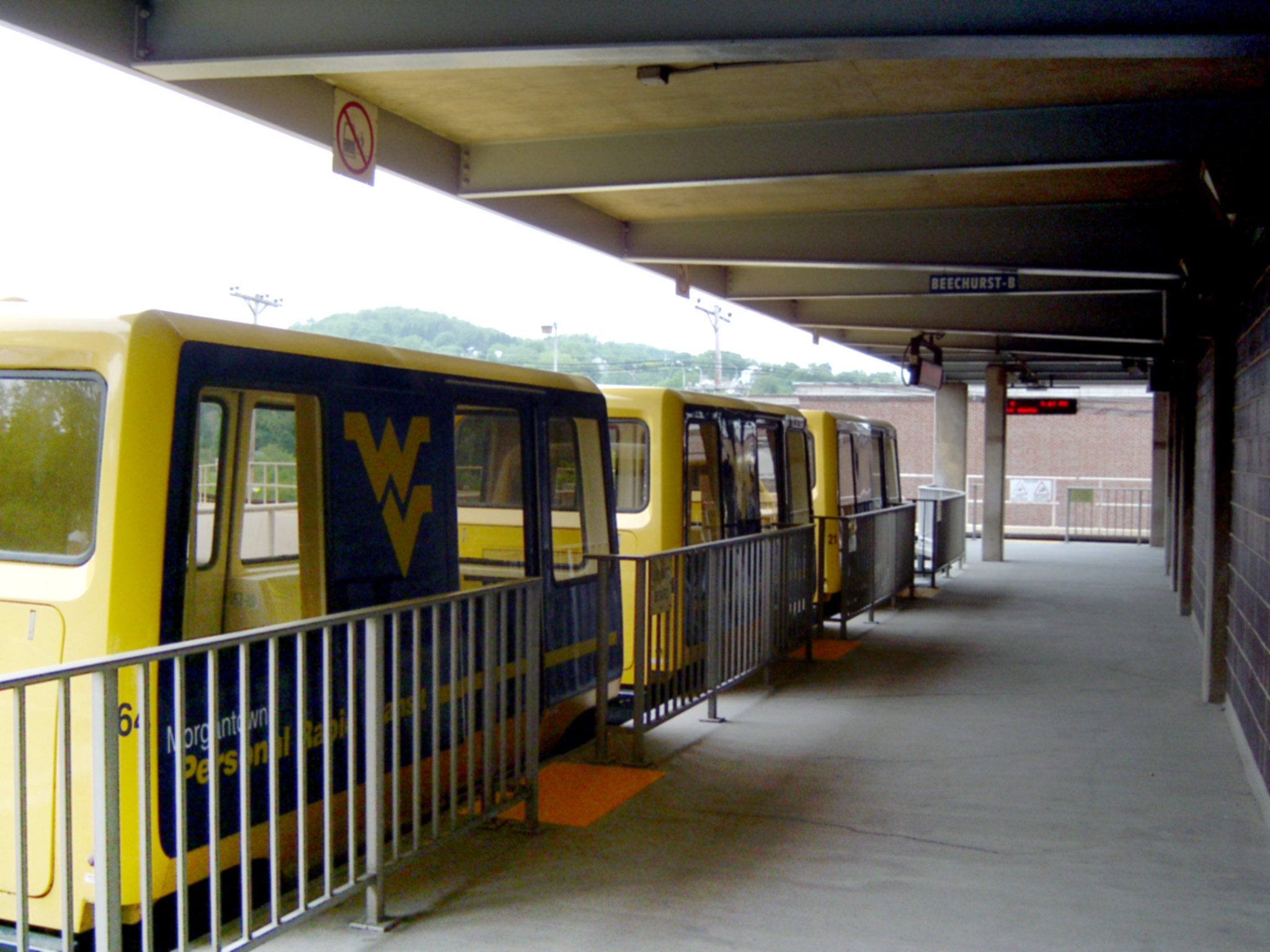
The PRT shuttles students to and from WVU's Health Sciences, Evansdale, and Downtown campuses.

Due to the distance between WVU's three campuses, the university built the innovative Personal Rapid Transit (PRT) system to link the campuses (Downtown, Evansdale, and Health Sciences) and reduce student traffic on local highways. Boeing began construction on the Personal Rapid Transit (PRT) system in 1972. The unique aspect that makes the system "personal" is that a rider specifies their destination when entering the system and, depending on the system load, the PRT can dispatch a car that will travel directly to that station.

The PRT began operation in 1973, with U.S. President Richard Nixon's daughter, Tricia, aboard one of five prototype cars for a demonstration ride.

The system has 8.7 miles (14.0 km) of guideway track and five stations. The vehicles are rubber-tired, but the cars have constant contact with a separate electrified rail. Steam heating keeps the elevated guideway free of snow and ice.

The National Society of Professional Engineers named the WVU PRT one of the top 10 engineering achievements of 1972, and in 1997 The New Electric Railway Journal picked the WVU PRT as the best people mover in North America (for 1996).

In 2006 the U.S. Department of Transportation and U.S. Environmental Protection Agency dubbed WVU one of the best workplaces for commuters.

Each autumn, during Mountaineer Week celebrations, a special PRT car is placed in front of the Mountainlair student union where groups of students participate in the "PRT Cram" with the objective of squeezing in as many people as possible. A record of 97 was set in 2000.

=== Divisional campuses ===
WVU has two divisional campuses:

- Potomac State College of West Virginia University in Keyser
- West Virginia University Institute of Technology in Beckley

West Virginia University at Parkersburg, a primarily two-year school, was a regional campus of WVU, but has been independent since 2009.

== Academics ==
=== Reputation and rankings ===
Academic rankings

National
- Forbes: 303
- U.S. News & World Report: 222 (tie)
- Washington Monthly: 374
- WSJ/College Pulse: 265

Global
- ARWU: 501–600
- QS: 1,001–1,200
- U.S. News & World Report: 667 (tie)

WVU is classified among "R1: Doctoral Universities – Very high research activity". According to the National Science Foundation, WVU spent $246.2 million on research and development in fiscal year 2023, ranking it 121st in the nation. WVU is affiliated with the Rockefeller Neurosciences Institute, dedicated to the study of Alzheimer's and other diseases that affect the brain. WVU is also a leader in biometric technology research and the Federal Bureau of Investigation's lead academic partner in biometrics research.

=== Admissions ===
Freshman West Virginia resident applicants must have a 2.0 GPA and either an SAT super score of 990 of 1600 or an ACT super score of 19 of 36. For non-residents the requirements are a GPA of 2.5 and either a super score SAT 1060 or a super score ACT of 21. College and program admission requirements for first-time freshmen vary by program. The general freshman acceptance rate at WVU is 71.9% of applications received with an average entering student GPA of 3.42, an SAT super score of 1115 of 1600, and an ACT super score of 24 of 36.

In the fall of 2020, the university relaxed its test score requirements for students applying for admission in response to the coronavirus pandemic. According to WVU assistant vice president of Enrollment Management George Zimmerman, if students are unable to take the SAT or ACT, they will still be admitted to WVU as long as they have shown academic ability in other areas of their application. The policy is said to be in effect until spring 2023.

=== Curriculum ===
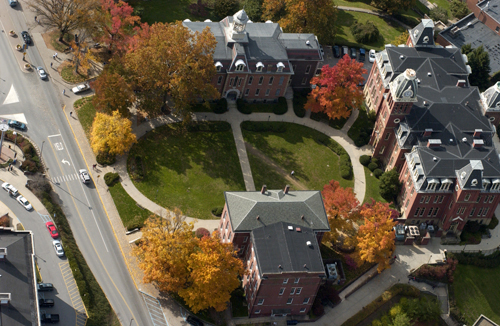
Woodburn Circle on the downtown campus – Martin Hall (top), Woodburn Hall (right), Chitwood Hall (bottom)

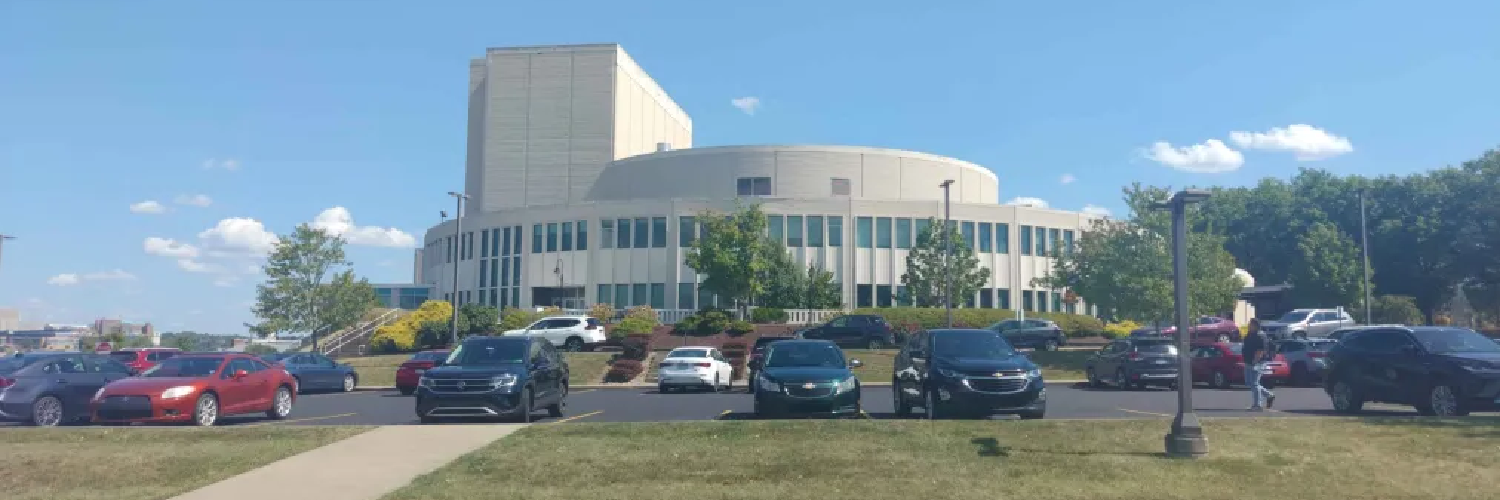
Canady Creative Arts Center in 2024

West Virginia University is organized into 15 degree-granting colleges or schools, and also offers an Honors College.

- College of Creative Arts and Media
- Davis College of Agriculture and Natural Resources
- Eberly College of Arts & Sciences
- John Chambers College of Business & Economics
- Benjamin M. Statler College of Engineering & Mineral Resources
- College of Applied Human Science
- College of Law
- School of Dentistry
- School of Medicine
- School of Nursing
- School of Pharmacy
- School of Public Health
- University College
- Honors College

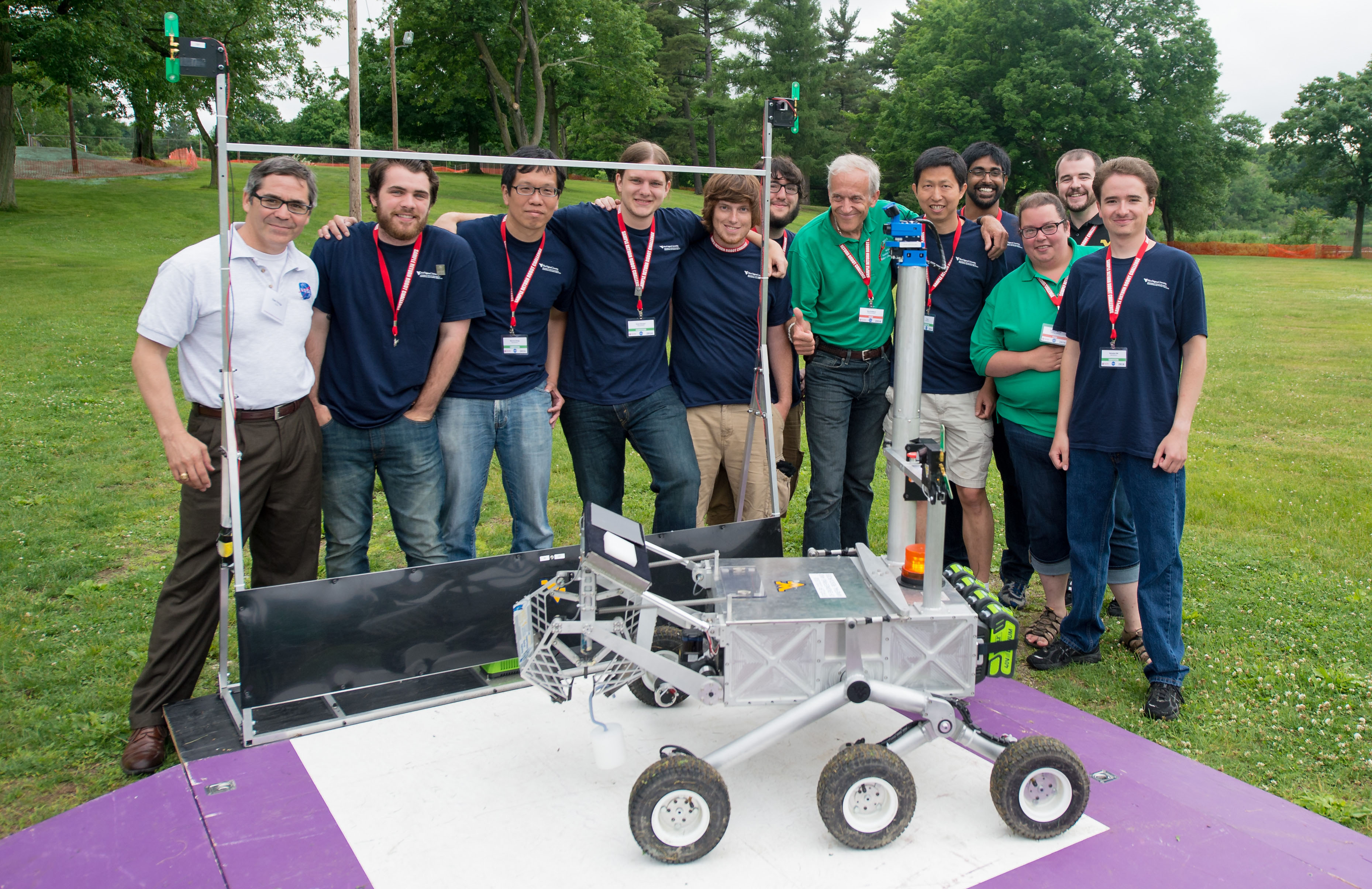
The 2014 WVU Robotics Team won the NASA Centennial Challenge (NASA/Joel Kowsky).

WVU's forensics and investigative science program was originally created through a partnership with the Federal Bureau of Investigation. The program is accredited by the American Academy of Forensic Sciences and is the official library holdings repository for the International Association for Identification. Facilities include four "crime-scene" houses, a vehicle processing garage, a ballistics laboratory, and numerous traditional laboratories and classrooms in Ming Hsieh Hall and Oglebay Hall.

WVU's forensic accounting graduate programs were originally created through a grant from the National Institute of Justice. Today, these programs form the basis for a national curriculum used to teach fraud examination and to combat white-collar crime.

WVU robotics teams have won several international competitions such as the NASA Robotic Mining Competition and the NASA/NIA RASC-AL Exploration Robot-OPS Challenge. In 2016, a WVU team won the final NASA Sample Return Robot Centennial Challenge with a $750,000 prize.

Biometrics is an engineering-centric field of study offered at WVU, the first institution in the world to establish a Bachelor of Science degree in Biometric Systems. In 2003, the university also founded the initial chapter of the Student Society for the Advancement of Biometrics (SSAB). On February 6, 2008, WVU became the national academic leader for the FBI's biometric research. WVU is also the founding site for the Center for Identification Technology Research (CITeR), focusing on biometrics and identification technology.

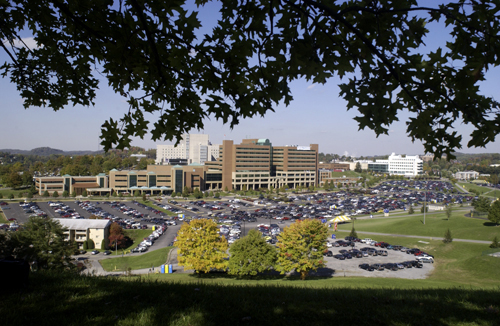
Health Sciences Campus

The Robert C. Byrd Health Sciences Center is on West Virginia University's Evansdale Campus, and houses the Schools of Dentistry, Medicine, Nursing, and Pharmacy. These schools grant doctoral and professional degrees in 16 different fields.

=== Libraries ===
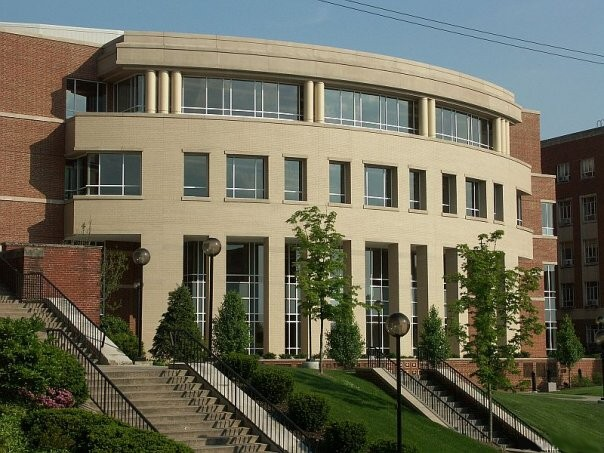
Wise Library on the downtown campus is West Virginia University's main library.

The West Virginia University Libraries encompasses seven libraries and the WVU Press. The West Virginia and Regional History Center (the world's largest collection of West Virginia-related research material), is in the Wise Library on the Downtown Campus. Collections include an Appalachian collection.

The Evansdale Library supports the academic programs and research centered on the Evansdale Campus. The library holds materials in the disciplines of agriculture, art, computer science, education, engineering, forestry, landscape architecture, mineral resources, music, physical education, and theater. In addition to the collections, Evansdale Library is home to da Vinci's Cafe, an Information Technology Services Big Prints! poster printing lab, and the Academic Innovation Teaching and Learning Commons Sandbox.

The university co-publishes the Labor Studies Journal with the United Association for Labor Education.

== Student life ==
Student demographics as of Fall 2025
Race and ethnicity	Total
White	79.5%
Two or more races	4.7%
Hispanic	4.7%
Black	3.2%
Asian	1.8%
International student	3.9%
Unknown	1.9%
Gender Makeup
Male	46.9%
Female	53.1%

=== Events ===
FallFest welcomes students to the university by providing an evening of entertainment and musical performances traditionally held during the first week of the fall semester and traditionally at the Mountainlair Student Union. The event began in 1995 as a safe alternative to partying and has become one of the largest University-sponsored events, typically drawing crowds of 15,000 or more. The celebration has been highlighted by a series of evening concerts by renowned artists. A dance party, film festival, comedy show, and several indoor musical performances are also featured.

Mountaineer Week is a celebration of WVU tradition and Appalachian heritage that began in 1947. Festivities have expanded to include competitions among WVU students, designed to honor school and state pride. A beard-growing competition introduced in 1949 has continued throughout the event's history. Participants must shave before the panel of judges that also chooses the winner at the end of the competition. The Mr. and Ms. Mountaineer competition has been included in Mountaineer Week since 1962, honoring one male and one female student who show "outstanding school spirit, academic excellence, and extracurricular involvement". The annual PRT Cram features the unique PRT system, where students compete to fit the maximum number of riders on a special-model PRT car with the windows removed. The record was set in 2000 when 97 students fit inside one PRT car.

The Lighting of Woodburn Hall is an annual university ceremony held in early December to light historic Woodburn Hall for the holiday season. The event began in 1987 and is open to the public. Christmas carols are typically sung and donations are taken at the event to support community organizations. Patients from WVU's Children's hospital are often selected to light the Hall.

Fall Family Weekend is an opportunity for students' family members to experience WVU campus life by attending classes, athletic events, college presentations, and student events such as WVU "Up All Night". Tours of the campus facilities are offered by individual colleges and organizations, including tours of the PRT.

Homecoming weekend activities include the Alumni Band-led homecoming parade through downtown Morgantown, the crowning of the royalty, and a football game with a performance by the WVU Alumni band. Student organizations participate in the parade by designing floats. Receptions are held by colleges, student groups, and the alumni center.

Greek Week is held during the spring semester. Highlights include airband events, where organizations compete in cheerleading and dance routines, and sports competitions on the Mountainlair recreational field.

=== Recreation ===
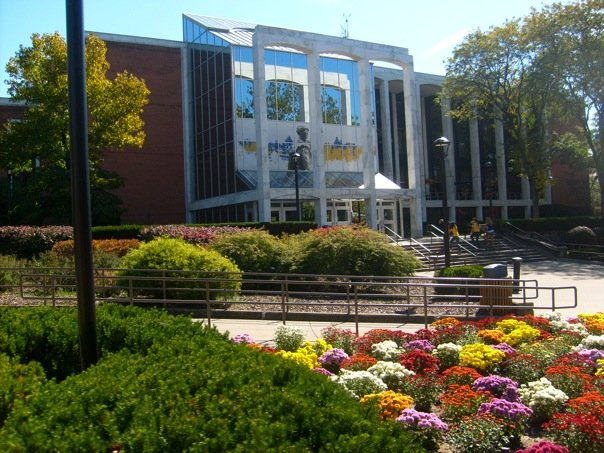
The Mountainlair Student Union on WVU's downtown campus

The Mountainlair Student Union, commonly called "the Lair" by students, is the three-floor student union building at WVU. The building dates to 1968 and replaced an earlier structure built in 1948. The student union offers many recreational opportunities to students including a movie theater, bowling alley, pool hall, ballrooms, video game arcade, a cafeteria-style restaurant, and a collection of fast food restaurants.

The Student Recreation Center is a 177,000-square-foot (16,400 m^{2}) recreation facility that opened before the 2001 academic year with an initial construction cost of $34 million. The facility offers a six-lane swimming pool, 20‑seat spa, 17,000 square feet (1,600 m^{2}) of cardio and free-weight equipment, an elevated running track, basketball courts, volleyball and badminton courts, glass squash and racquetball courts, and a 50-foot (15 m) climbing wall. The center also offers a variety of wellness programs, personal training, child care services, exercise classes, and intramural activities.

The Mountaineer Adventure Program (MAP) offers several activities including Adventure WV, Challenge Course, and International Trips. Adventure WV is focused on providing guidance to freshmen and sophomores through various outdoor orientation expeditions. The Challenge Course program uses a recreational facility designed to teach teamwork and problem-solving skills through physical interaction. International Trips offers worldwide recreational opportunities to places like Fiji and Peru, as well as study abroad credit courses. Several of the MAP programs provide University-accepted credit hours.

The Outdoor Recreation Center, a division of the Student Recreation Center, helps students find recreational activities locally and in other parts of West Virginia. The center sponsors some trips, including whitewater rafting on the Cheat River and hiking in the Monongahela National Forest. Students can take advantage of West Virginia's natural wilderness by renting outdoor recreational equipment for hiking, camping, climbing, fishing, biking, skiing, and whitewater rafting, all of which is available with minimal travel time. WVU's main campus is next to the Monongahela River along which runs the Caperton Trail, also known as the "Rail Trail", a 10-mile (16 km) paved path for walking, running, or biking. Other connecting trails total 43 miles (69 km) in additional length, extending from the Pennsylvania border to Prickett's Fort State Park. Many student groups take day trips to the nearby Coopers Rock State Forest, which is less than 15 miles (24 km) from WVU's campus.

=== Student organizations ===
West Virginia University offers more than 400 student-run organizations and clubs. Many of the organizations are associated with academia, religion, culture, military service, politics, recreation, or sports.

==== Fraternities and sororities ====
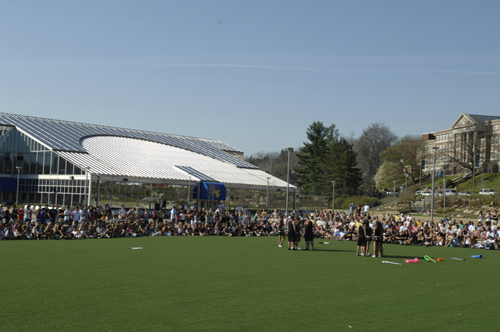
Greek Games on Mountainlair Plaza during WVU's annual Greek Week

There are several fraternities and sororities on campus.

Fraternity controversies

In 2014, 18-year-old Kappa Sigma pledge Nolan Burch died during a hazing incident at the fraternity house. Police say his blood-alcohol level was 0.493% at the time of his death. A lawsuit was settled over the student's death in 2018 for $250,000.

In 2019, City Drive Studios produced the documentary Breathe, Nolan, Breathe, which details what led up to Burch's death. The film begins with security footage inside the Kappa Sigma house, showing a fraternity brother performing CPR on Burch's limp body hours after he was dragged inside. The brother kept repeating the words, "breathe, Nolan, breathe." Video also shows fraternity brothers filming Burch lying on a wooden plank, and kicking him. According to City Drive Studios, "The purpose of this film is to stop this from ever happening again and to save lives."

=== Student media ===
The Daily Athenaeum, nicknamed the DA, is the 9th-largest newspaper in West Virginia. Offered free on campus, it generates income through advertisements and student fees. The paper began in 1887 as a weekly literary magazine, with writing, editing and production taken over by the newly formed School of Journalism in the 1920s. In 1970, the paper split from the School of Journalism and became an independent campus entity governed by the Student Publications Board. The DA was voted as the Princeton Review's 10th-best college newspaper in the United States in 2005, 15th in 2006, and 8th in 2007.

WWVU-FM, called U92 or The Moose, plays new music, talk shows, and newscasts. On the air since 1982, U92 can be heard in the Morgantown area at 91.7 FM and also streams live on the internet. In 2007 the station was one of four college radio stations nominated for College Music Journal's Station of the Year Award. In 2015 CMJ awarded the station with three awards including Station of the Year.

=== Student health ===
The Student Center of Health, also known under the label "WELLWVU", provides services related to student health, disease prevention, and awareness. The Carruth Center for Psychological and Psychiatric Services offers therapy to any WVU student. The Robert C. Byrd Health Science Center and the associated West Virginia University Hospitals, on the Health Science Campus, serve as West Virginia's largest healthcare institution. The hospitals provide a comprehensive set of healthcare needs for local and regional patients. WVU students have full access to healthcare resources, which are accessible from the PRT towers station.

==== WVU Student Health Services ====
Starting with the fall 2014 semester, WVU implemented a mandatory student health insurance policy, with an opt-out. All domestic students at West Virginia University and WVU Tech enrolled in six or more credit hours, and international students enrolled in 1 or more credit hours, are required to carry health insurance coverage.

With the opening of the new Student Health and Wellness building on the Evansdale Campus, WVU Medical Corporation operates the medical services of Student Health. This is a WVU Urgent Care Clinic office, and is the primary care provider to students who use WVU's Aetna Health Insurance policy. The clinic is open seven days a week.

=== Arts and entertainment ===
WVU Arts & Entertainment (A&E) sponsors entertainment events for students throughout the academic year. The department organizes the annual FallFest event, which features popular musicians, comedians, and other performers. WVU A&E annually hosts several concerts at the WVU Coliseum and Canady Creative Arts Center, with past performances by Akon, The All-American Rejects, The Fray, Kelly Clarkson, Ludacris, Maroon 5, Reba McEntire, Willie Nelson, and 50 Cent. The Canady Creative Arts Center was constructed in 1967, it included a new Möller pipe organ.

The West Virginia Public Theater (WVPT) is one of two professional musical theaters in West Virginia. The group is near WVU's campus and performs several Broadway numbers yearly.

The 5,300-square-foot (490 m^{2}) Art Museum of West Virginia University features touring exhibitions and displays a collection including over 2,500 works of art from the Appalachian region, Asia, and Africa.

The Royce J. and Caroline B. Watts Museum, on the Evansdale campus, features tools, equipment, artifacts, photos, and other items related to West Virginia's coal and petroleum industries.

== Athletics ==
The "Flying WV" is the most widely used logo in West Virginia University athletics.

The school's sports teams are called the Mountaineers and compete in the NCAA's Division I. The school has teams in 17 college sports and has won several national championships, including 20 NCAA Rifle Championships as of March 2025. Formerly a full member of the Big East Conference in all sports, on October 28, 2011, the school accepted an invitation to join the Big 12 Conference and became a member on July 1, 2012.

Notable athletes from West Virginia University include Ashley Lawrence, Jerry West, Jim Braxton, Marc Bulger, Avon Cobourne, Mike Compton, Noel Devine, Cecil Doggette, D'or Fischer, Mike Gansey, Marc "Major" O. Harris, Chris Henry, Joe Herber, Jeff Hostetler, Chuck Howley, Sam Huff, Darryl Talley, "Hot Rod" Hundley, Adam "Pacman" Jones, Joe Stydahar, Dan Mozes, Kevin Pittsnogle, Jerry Porter, Todd Sauerbrun, Steve Slaton, Ray Gaddis, Rod Thorn, Oliver Luck, Mike Vanderjagt, Pat White, Quincy Wilson, Amos Zereoué, Greg Jones, Joe Alexander, Owen Schmitt, Georgann Wells, Geno Smith, Ginny Thrasher, Pat McAfee, Tavon Austin, Miles McBride, and Jedd Gyorko.

=== Marching band ===
The West Virginia University Mountaineer Marching Band is nicknamed "The Pride of West Virginia." The 340-member band performs at every home football game and makes several local and national appearances throughout the year.

=== Fanbase ===
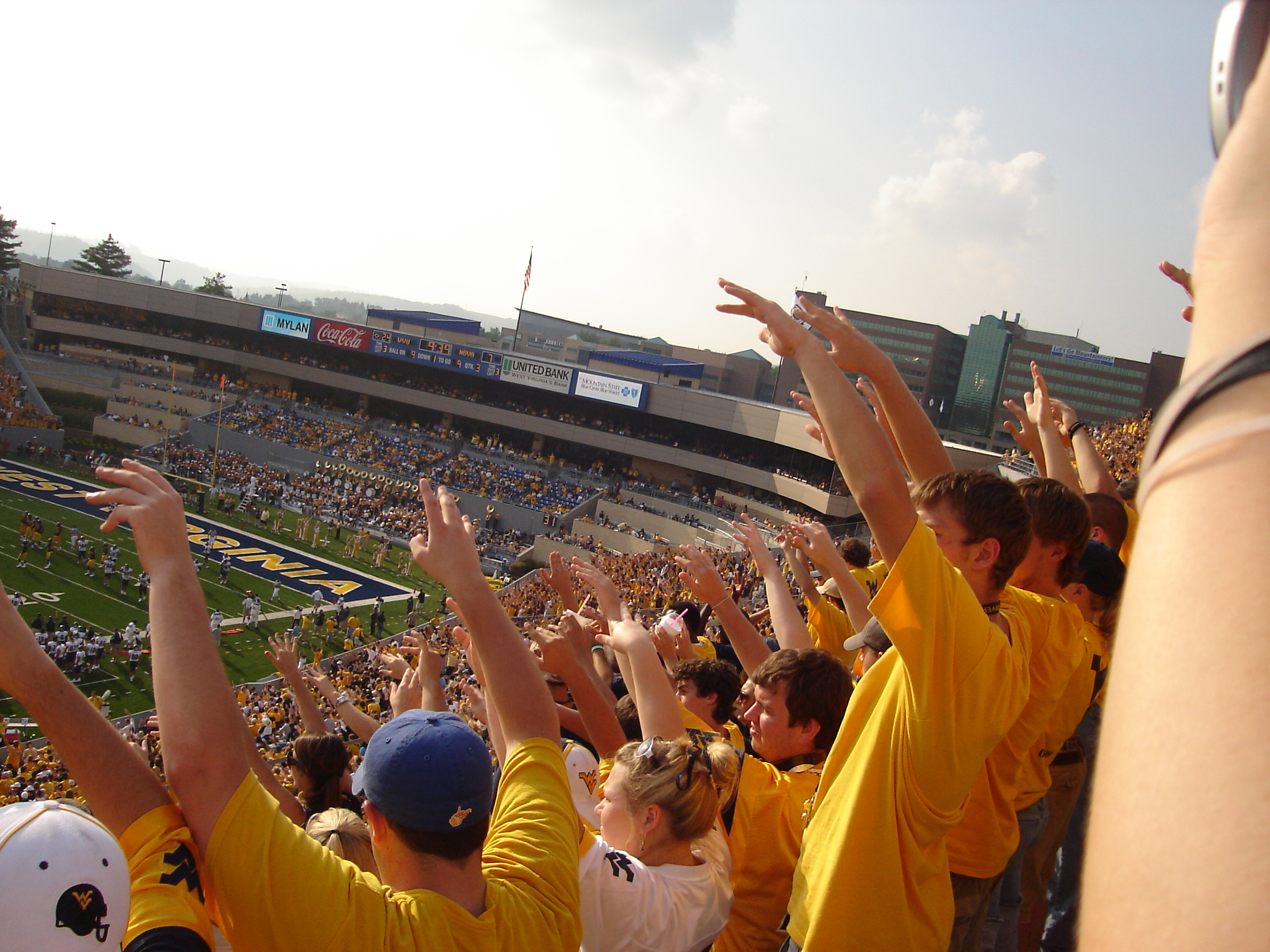
The WVU student section perform the first down cheer at a home football game.

In a state that lacks professional sports franchises, West Virginians passionately support West Virginia University and its athletics teams. Former men's basketball head coach Bob Huggins, a former Mountaineer basketball player who was born in Morgantown, stated that the "strong bond between the university and the people of West Virginia" is a relationship that is difficult for non-natives to understand.

Members of the Morgantown-area community volunteered as Goodwill City Ambassadors for the first time in the fall of 2012 to welcome visiting fans to the football games. The Goodwill City initiative is a collaborative effort of the City of Morgantown, WVU, Morgantown's Dominion Post, and community residents.

== Pageantry ==
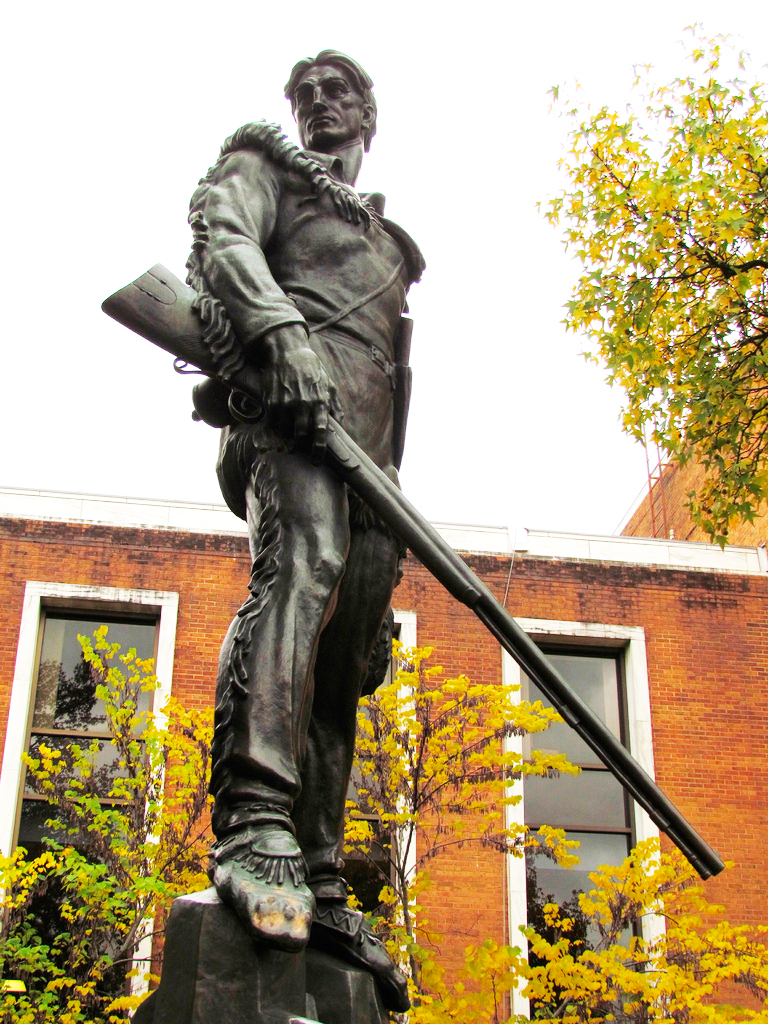
The Mountaineer (1971), West Virginia University, Morgantown, West Virginia

The Mountaineer was adopted in 1890 as the official school mascot and unofficially began appearing at sporting events in 1936. A new Mountaineer is selected each year during the final two men's home basketball games, with the formal title "The Mountaineer of West Virginia University". The new Mountaineer receives a scholarship, a tailor-made buckskin suit with a coonskin hat, and a period rifle and powder horn for discharging when appropriate and safe. The mascot travels with most sports teams throughout the academic year. While not required, male mascots traditionally grow a beard.

The "Flying WV" is the most widely used logo in West Virginia athletics. It debuted in 1980 as a part of a football uniform redesign by Coach Don Nehlen, and was adopted as the official logo for the university in 1983. While the "Flying WV" represents all university entities, unique logos are occasionally used for individual departments. Some examples include the script West Virginia logo for the WVU Department of Intercollegiate Athletics and the interlocking WV logo used in baseball.

Fight songs of West Virginia University include "Hail, West Virginia" and "Fight Mountaineers". The West Virginia University Alma Mater was composed in 1937, and is sung before every home football game. The crowd sings along as the WVU Marching Band stands playing it on the field, as part of the pregame show.

"Old gold and blue", the official University colors, were selected by the upperclassmen of 1890 from the West Virginia state seal. While the official school colors are old gold and blue, brighter gold is used in official university logos and merchandise. This change in color scheme is often cited for the lack of a universal standard for colors during the 19th century when the university's colors were selected. Additionally, the brighter gold is argued to create a more intimidating environment for sporting events. The university accepts "gold and blue" for the color scheme, but states clearly that the colors are not "blue and gold", to distinguish West Virginia from its rival, the University of Pittsburgh.

=== Sporting traditions ===
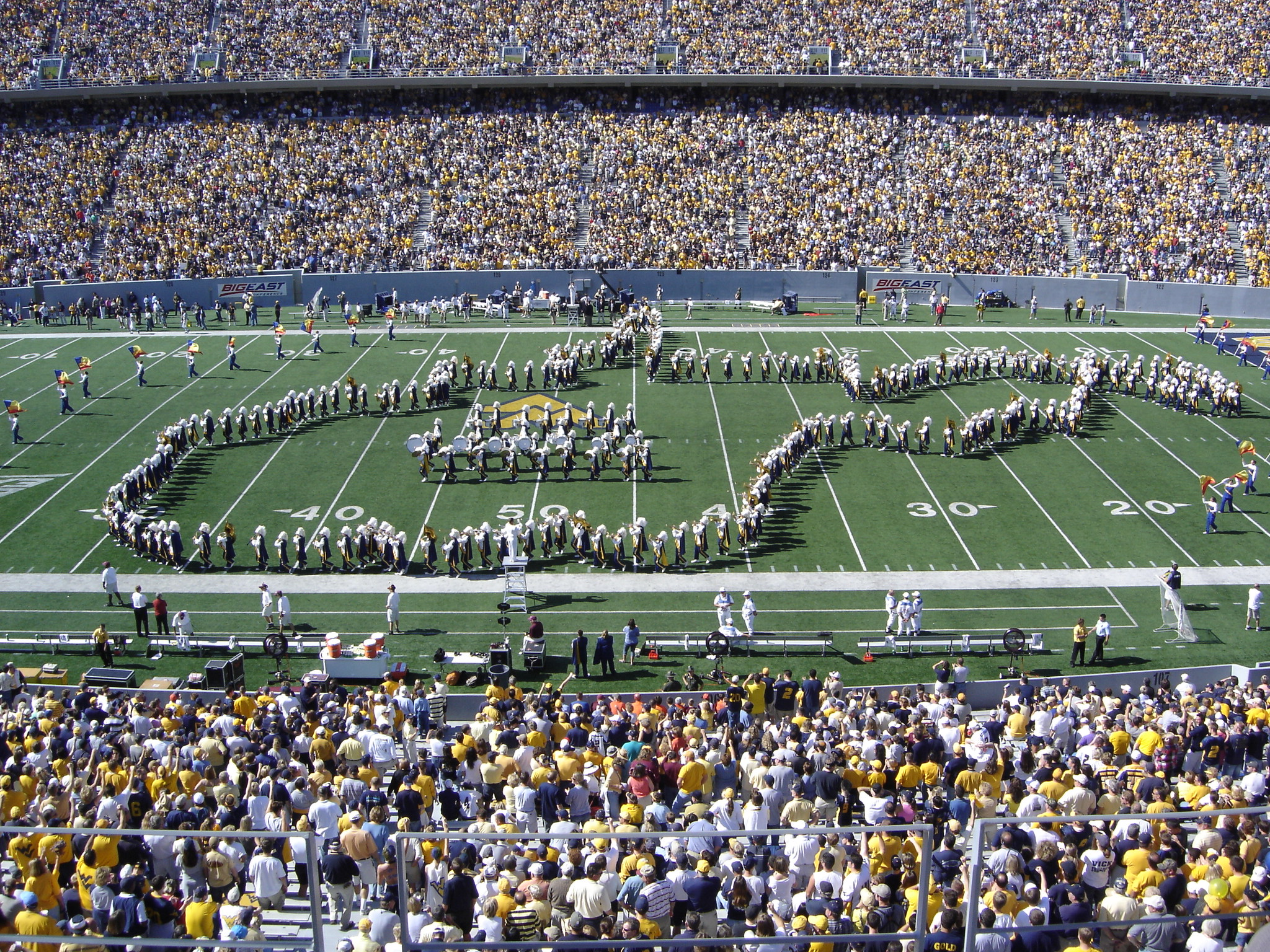
The formation of the state outline by The Pride of West Virginia

The unofficial song of the university, "Take Me Home, Country Roads" by John Denver, became an official West Virginia state song on March 8, 2014. In 1980 John Denver performed his hit song "Take Me Home, Country Roads" at the dedication of Mountaineer Field, and it has since become a tradition for fans to remain in the stands following every Mountaineer victory and sing the song with the players. Although the tradition originated during football games, it is now recognized throughout the university, with the song performed at various athletic events and ceremonies. Sports Illustrated named the singing of "Country Roads" as one of the must-see college traditions.

The Pride of West Virginia is the official marching band of the university. The band's football pre-game show includes traditions such as the Drumline's "Tunnel" and "Boogie" cadences, the 220‑beat per minute run-on cadence to start the performance, marching the "WV" logo down the field to the university fight song, "Fight Mountaineers", expanding circles during Simple Gifts, and the formation of the state's outline during "Hail, West Virginia".

The Firing of the Rifle is a tradition carried out by the Mountaineer mascot to open several athletic events. The Mountaineer points the gun into the air with one arm and fires a blank shot from a custom rifle, a signal to the crowd to begin cheering at home football and basketball games. The Mountaineer also fires the rifle every time the team scores during football games.

The Carpet Roll is a WVU men's basketball tradition. In 1955 Fred Schaus and Alex Mumford devised the idea of rolling out an elaborate gold and blue carpet for Mountaineer basketball players to use when taking the court for pre-game warm-ups. In addition, Mountaineer players warmed up with a special gold and blue basketball. The university continued this tradition until the late 1960s when it died out, but former Mountaineer player Gale Catlett reintroduced the carpet when he returned to West Virginia University in 1978 as head coach of the men's basketball team.

== Popular culture ==
- West Virginia University is a location in the game Fallout 76, as Vault-Tec University.
