= West Virginia United Students' Union =

Students' union at West Virginia University

WVUSU
- West Virginia United Students' Union
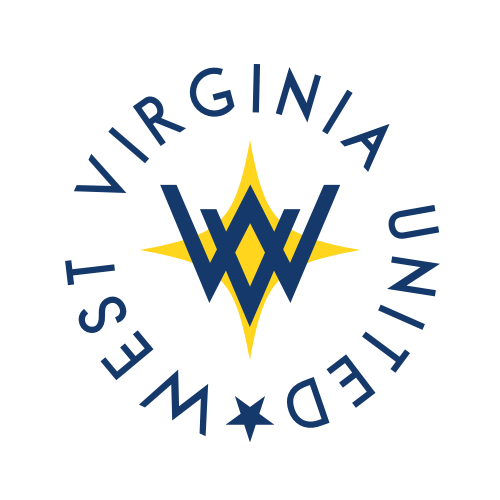
- Formation: 20 July 2023; 3 years ago
- Founders: Christian Adams; Matthew Kolb; Winston Smith
- Members: 400+ Students
- Assembly President: Matthew Kolb
- Main organ: Assembly of Delegates
- Website: https://www.wvusu.org/

The West Virginia United Students' Union (WVUSU) is a students' union with the self-stated goal of consolidating and strategically directing student power at West Virginia University (WVU).

== History ==
=== Beginnings and the WVU Budget Crisis ===
WVUSU, founded by West Virginia University undergraduates leading up to the fall semester of 2023, began organizing in response to the university's administrative review into its academic programs. Since its formation was announced on July 20, WVUSU has gained over four hundred members.

On August 11, 2023, WVU's administration released its recommendations to fill a $45 million budget deficit by eliminating 32 majors and reducing faculty by 169 positions. WVUSU opposed the recommendations by organizing a student walkout held ten days later. Walkout rallies were held on the university's Evansdale and Downtown campuses and saw hundreds of participants, with the downtown rally growing to the point that participants blocked traffic. In addition to opposing the recommendations, participants called for university president E. Gordon Gee to be removed from his position. The rallies saw physical support from faculty and two sitting members and one former member of the West Virginia House of Delegates. That same week, WVUSU led a live music event at the local performance venue 123 Pleasant Street.

On August 31, 2023, WVUSU's Assembly of Delegates released a statement urging the student body president, who sits on WVU's Board of Governors, to vote against the recommended cuts and reductions.

Members of WVUSU attended the university's regular Student Government Association (SGA) assembly meeting on September 6, 2023, where they spoke against the recommended cuts and reductions and called for SGA to give make more efforts to support students.

On September 9, 2023, members of WVUSU joined Marshall University students in a solidarity rally on Marshall's campus in Huntington, WV. Many of the students in attendance expressed interest in forming a students' union at the university.

On September 14, 2023, members of WVUSU rallied outside the WVU Erickson Alumni Center ahead of the Board of Governors meeting to hear public comments regarding the recommendations. At the meeting, about fifty people, including WVUSU members, spoke in opposition to the recommendations, and not a single person spoke in favor.

On September 15, 2023, the Board of Governors vote to approve the recommendations was disrupted by student protesters, led by WVUSU, inside the meeting room. The students eventually exited the meeting room, which was followed by the board chair stating that she did not tell them to leave and that she "will not let that misinformation spread." The students returned, attempted to re-enter the meeting room, and were physically removed by university personnel, according to WVU's student newspaper The Daily Athenaeum. The students continued their protest outside the building and outside the windows of the meeting room while the board voted in favor of eliminating twenty-eight programs and one hundred forty-three faculty positions.

=== Post-Board of Governors Vote ===
On October 23, 2023, WVUSU and West Virginia Campus Workers organized a response, dubbed the "People's State of the University Address," to an address delivered by university president E. Gordon Gee earlier that afternoon. Speakers included the WVUSU Assembly President, Matthew Kolb, and Lisa DiBartolomeo, a teaching professor from the to-be-discontinued World Languages Department. The event's speeches included discussions of program cuts, reductions in force, and labor.
