= Athletic nickname =

Nickname for members of an athletic team

The athletic nickname, or equivalently athletic moniker, of a university or college within the United States and Canada is the name officially adopted by that institution for at least the members of its athletic teams. Typically as a matter of engendering school spirit, the institution either officially or unofficially uses this moniker of the institution's athletic teams also as a nickname to refer to people associated with the institution, especially its current students, but also often its alumni, its faculty, and its administration as well. This practice at the university and college tertiary higher-education level has proven so popular that it extended to the high school secondary-education level in the United States and Canada and even to the primary-education level as well.

== Themes ==
In the United States and Canada, multiple recurring themes have appeared over time for choosing a school's athletic nickname. In almost all cases, the institution chooses an athletic nickname with an overtly positive goal in mind, where that goal reflects the character of the institution—either a previously established characteristic or a characteristic hoped for as a goal henceforth.

=== Abstract concept ===
Often by choosing an abstract concept as its athletic moniker, the institution wants to inspire its student-athletes on and off the field to achieve success that the abstract concept represents. Examples: Cornell Big Red, Stanford Cardinal, UIC Flames, Tulane Green Wave.

=== Animal ===
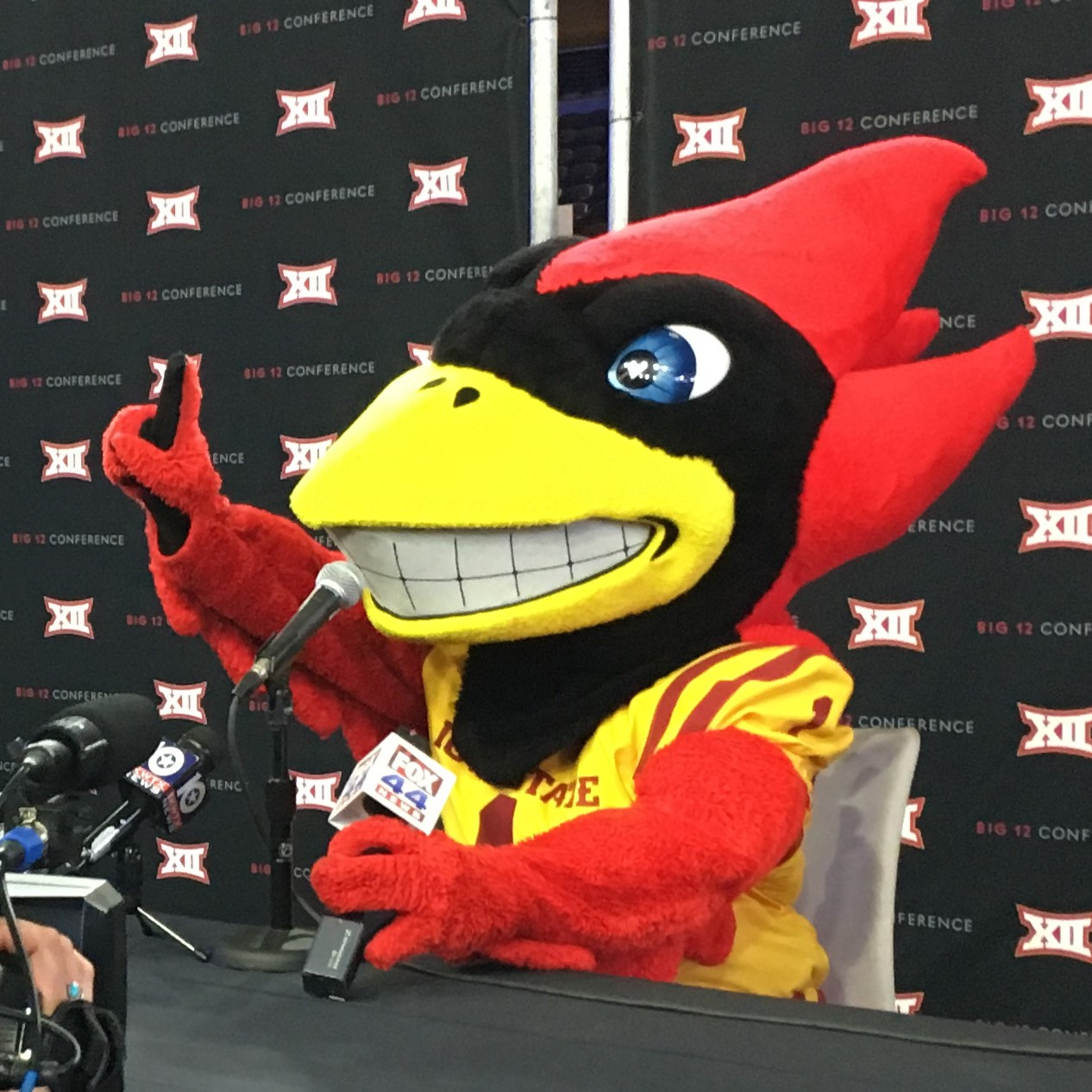
Cy the Cardinal, mascot of Iowa State University

Often by choosing an animal, the school wants to emphasize the instillation of fear of losing athletic competitions to the institution's teams, such as through an especially fierce or stealthy animal. When the school chooses an animal as its athletic nickname, usually in the plural or as a collective noun for a group of that animal, then typically, the school has that animal (in the singular) as its mascot, either specifically named with a proper noun or generically referred to without a proper noun. Examples: Michigan Wolverines, Oregon Ducks, Princeton Tigers, Iowa Hawkeyes, California Golden Bears, Minnesota Golden Gophers, Texas Longhorns and the Bowling Green Falcons.

=== Collection ===
Often by choosing a collection that represents a summary of the institution's students or of its history. Such a collection may refer to an ethnicity; a profession; religious designation, such as saints; or other groupings of people. A portion of athletic monikers that fall into this collection category started originally as derogatory epithets from others, but as an act of defiance, the school embraced the term as a rallying cry to overcome the term's negative origin. Because a collection is hard to represent or iconify, when a school chooses a collection as its athletic nickname, the school typically chooses a related but different mascot that symbolizes that collection. Examples: Notre Dame Fighting Irish, Oklahoma Sooners, Purdue Boilermakers, Illinois Fighting Illini, Texas A&M Aggies

=== Hero or archetype ===
A small number of schools choose an archetypical heroic person as their official athletic nickname. This person may be a graduate of the school who is viewed as embodying the school's mission or an archetypal person who is symbolic of the school's area, such as the West Virginia University Mountaineer. In religiously affiliated schools, this person may be an historical person who has received an official designation in that religion, such as a saint in the Roman Catholic or Eastern Orthodox Churches.

=== Native American likeness ===
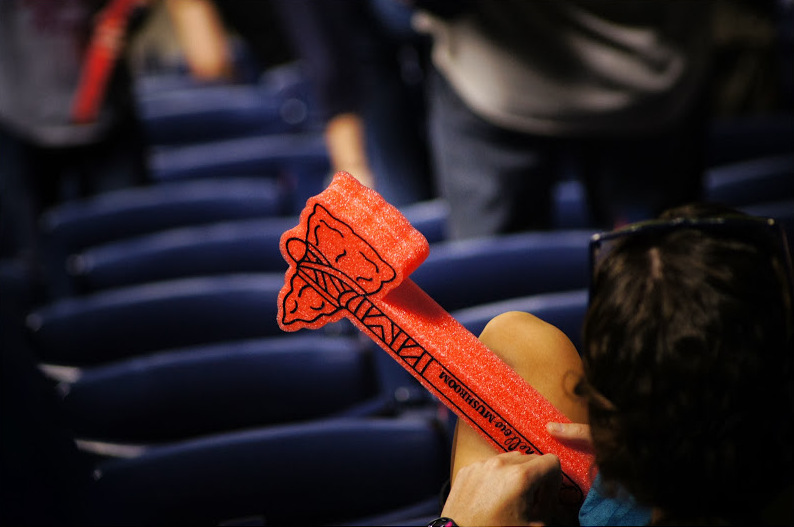
The Atlanta Braves encouraged fans to gesture with the tomahawk chop, distributing foam tomahawks at games and other events.

Likenesses to Native Americans were at one time widely popular athletic monikers, especially for schools that adopted them in the 19th or early 20th century. In recent years, some Native American organizations have protested the unlicensed use of likenesses of Native Americans related to team names, team logos, athletic monikers, cheerleaders, and cheering techniques. The granting of overtly expressed written licenses by Native American organizations to use likenesses of Native Americans in these ways is rare, although not unheard of. In one notable example, two major groups of the Seminole nation, the Seminole Tribe of Florida and Seminole Nation of Oklahoma, have expressly given Florida State University permission to use the nickname "Seminoles" and certain Seminole imagery. Central Michigan University has a similar arrangement with the Saginaw Chippewa Indian Tribe to use the name "Chippewas".

Because of protests from some Native American organizations, some schools have changed their athletic moniker and mascot and cheering practices without significant objection once the issue was raised, especially if such offense toward a group of people was viewed as incompatible with that school's stated mission or if the threat of legal action was too burdensome. Other schools or their student bodies have defended their use of Native American likenesses, especially if the institution views the use of Native American likenesses as respectful or so intimately tied with history to be inseparable from the institution, such as if the name of institution derives from the name of a tribe. Still other schools have embarked on a series of failed attempts to find a replacement.

=== Common and uncommon names ===
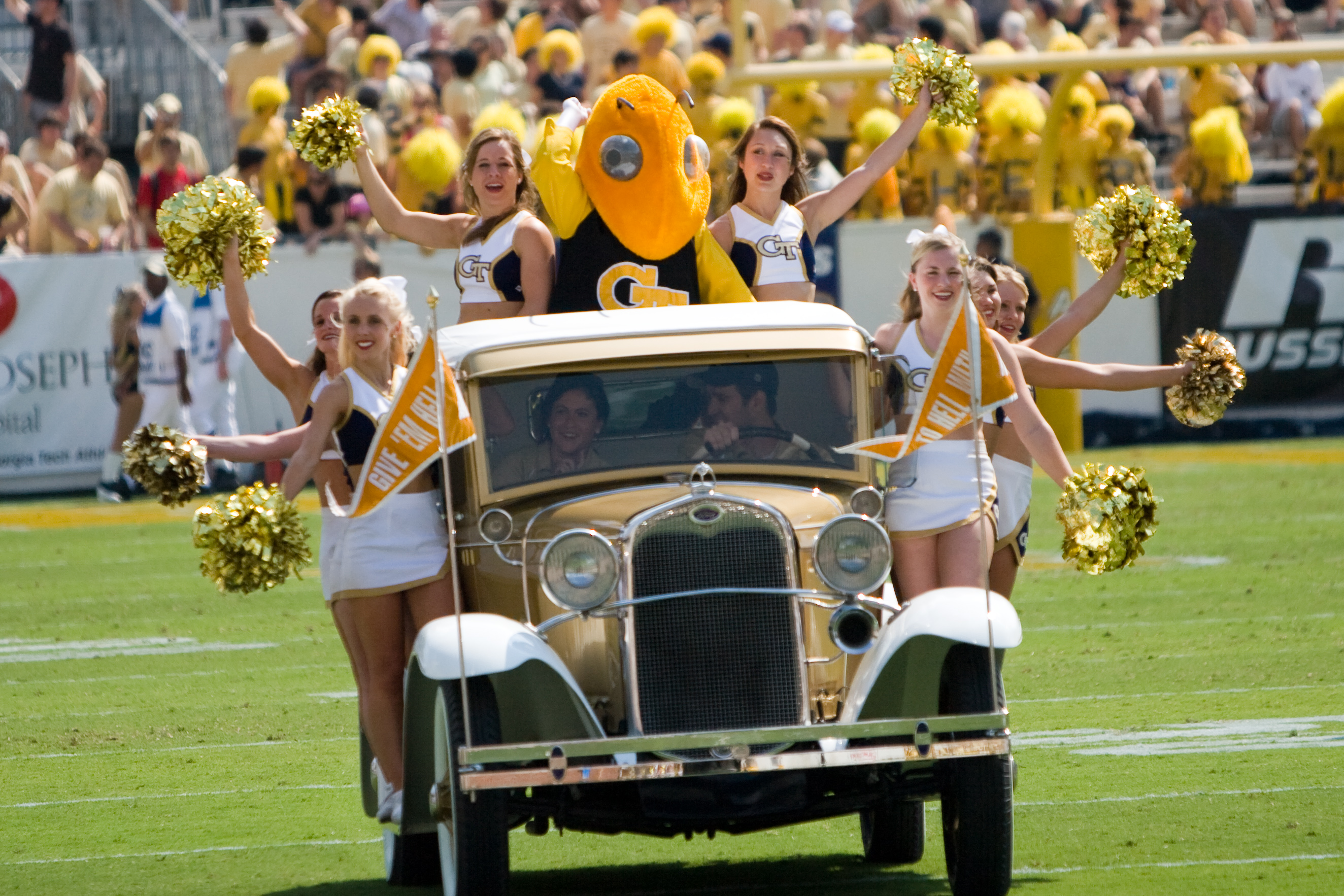
The official mascot of the Georgia Institute of Technology is the Ramblin' Wreck, a 1930 Ford Model A sport coupe.

Often, certain nicknames (animals and some abstract concepts, such as Giants, Broncos, or Wildcats) have become very common. However, some nicknames are unique to that school/team such as Illini, Demon Deacons or Fords.

== See also ==
- Lists of nicknames – nickname list articles on Wikipedia
