= United Association for Labor Education =

- Abbreviation: UALE
- Established: April 15, 2000; 26 years ago
- Founded at: Milwaukee
- Merger of: College Labor Education Association & Workers' Education Local 189
- Type: Non-profit organization
- Headquarters: Portland, Oregon
- Origins: Labor schools
- Region served: Canada & United States focus
- Methods: Conferences, trainings, awards, & publications
- Fields: Labor education, leadership development
- Members: 19 organizations + individuals (2026)
- General Secretary: Aliqae Geraci
- President: Elizabeth Pellerito
- Vice President – Unions: Richard Gaboton
- Vice President – Higher Education: Zach Cunningham
- Treasurer: Valerie Braman
- Publication: Labor Studies Journal
- Affiliations: IFWEA
- Awards: New Generation Award, Best Book Award
- Website: uale.org

United Association for Labor Education (UALE) is an international association for post-secondary, community, union and associated labor educators based in Chicago, Illinois.

UALE was founded on April 15, 2000, in Milwaukee, Wisconsin, through the merger of the university and College Labor Education Association and Workers' Education Local 189 (an affiliate of the Communications Workers of America, AFL–CIO).

The goals of the UALE are to promote the development and professionalization of labor education, and to advocate for increased support of labor education programs in higher education and the international labor movement.

UALE co-publishes, with West Virginia University, Labor Studies Journal, a multi-disciplinary publication about workers and labor organizations.

UALE is a member of the International Federation of Workers' Education Associations.
