= Mountainlair =

Coordinates: 39°38′05″N 79°57′12″W

West Virginia University Mountainlair
- The Lair
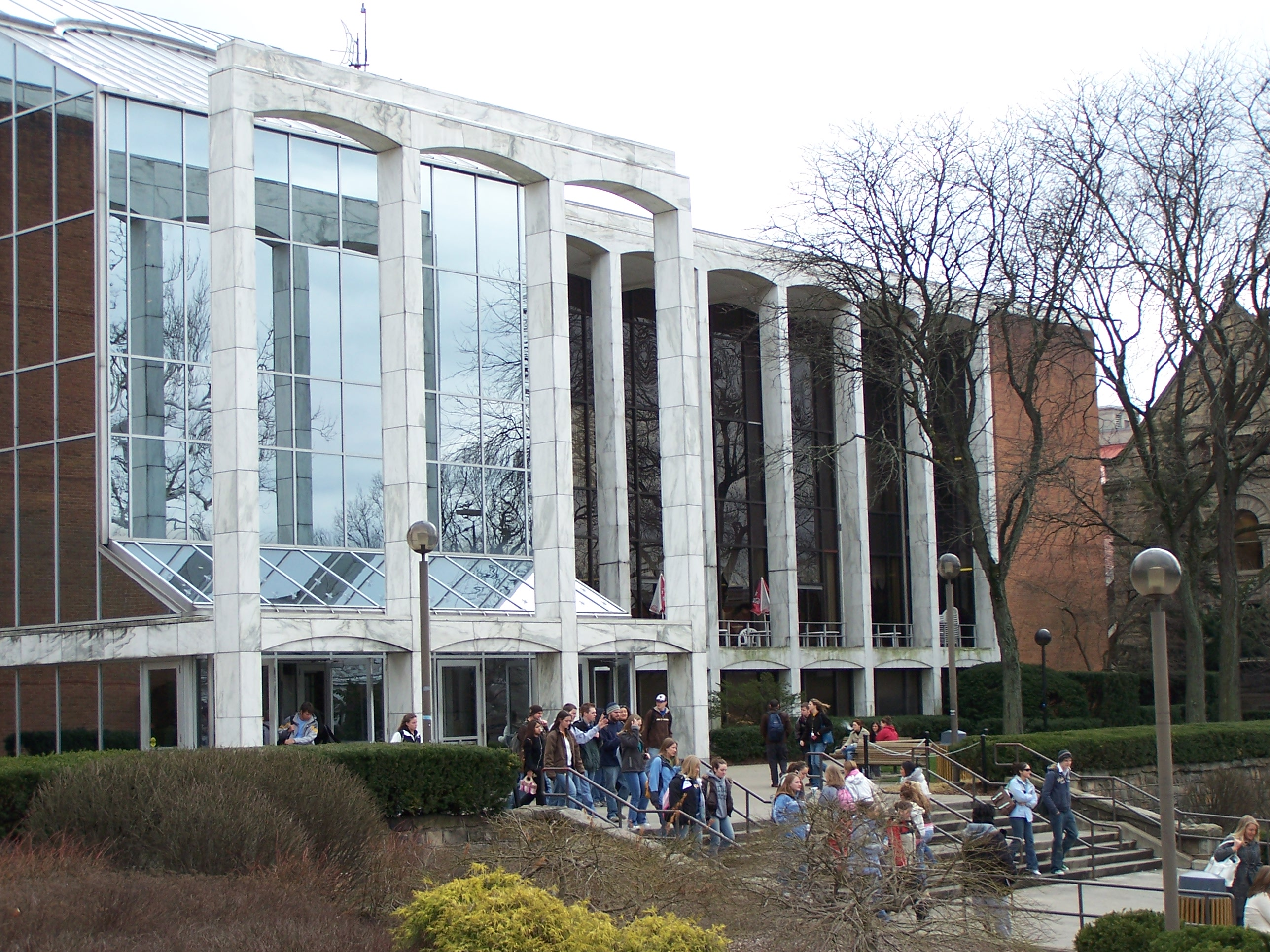
- The Mountainlair Student Union Building at West Virginia University
- Interactive map of the West Virginia University; Mountainlair area

General information
- Type: Student union
- Location: Monongalia County, West Virginia, United States
- Opened: 1968

Technical details
- Floor count: 3

The Mountainlair, commonly called "the Lair" by students, is the three-floor student union building at West Virginia University. The current building dates to 1968 and replaced an earlier structure built in 1948. The Mountainlair is also the site of American sculptor Donald De Lue's 1971 statue The Mountaineer, a bronze representation of West Virginia University's Mountaineer mascot.

== Description ==
The student union offers many services to students including an information desk, lounges, a post office, bank, movie theater, bowling alley, pool hall, video game arcade, cafeteria, and several chain restaurants. Along with these recreational facilities, the Mountainlair is also home to a large events ballroom, several meeting and conference rooms, and many administrative offices of the university. In addition, The Student Government Association (SGA) and other student organizations of special interest hold offices in the Student Organization Wing (SOW) of the Mountainlair, including the Hockey Club, Muslim Student Organizations, and Alpha Phi Omega National Service Fraternity. The Mountainlair's north wing additionally houses a coffee shop and the campus's main bookstore (managed and stocked by Barnes & Noble) and university shop. Located behind the main building is the Mountainlair parking garage, containing 245 short-term spaces and additional space for long-term. These facilities and its central location make the Mountainlair the "heart of the WVU campus."

== WVU "Up All Night" ==
WVU "Up All Night" is a program designed to provide a safe environment for WVU students to socialize during weekends. The Mountainlair has hosted "Up All Night" every Friday through Saturday during the fall and spring semesters since 1998. The University provides free food and beverages, and entertainment such as movie screenings at the Gluck Theater, laser tag, game shows, astro bowling, comedy caravans, and casino night. The program has garnered national attention from other universities as a solution for reducing alcohol consumption and partying on college campuses across the country. WVU administration have been asked to speak about its success at national conferences, and estimate the program's cost at $350,000 annually.
