= West Virginia Mountaineer =

Mascot of West Virginia University

- University: West Virginia University
- Conference: Big 12
- Description: Person in buckskins and coonskin cap, carrying a rifle
- First seen: 1920s

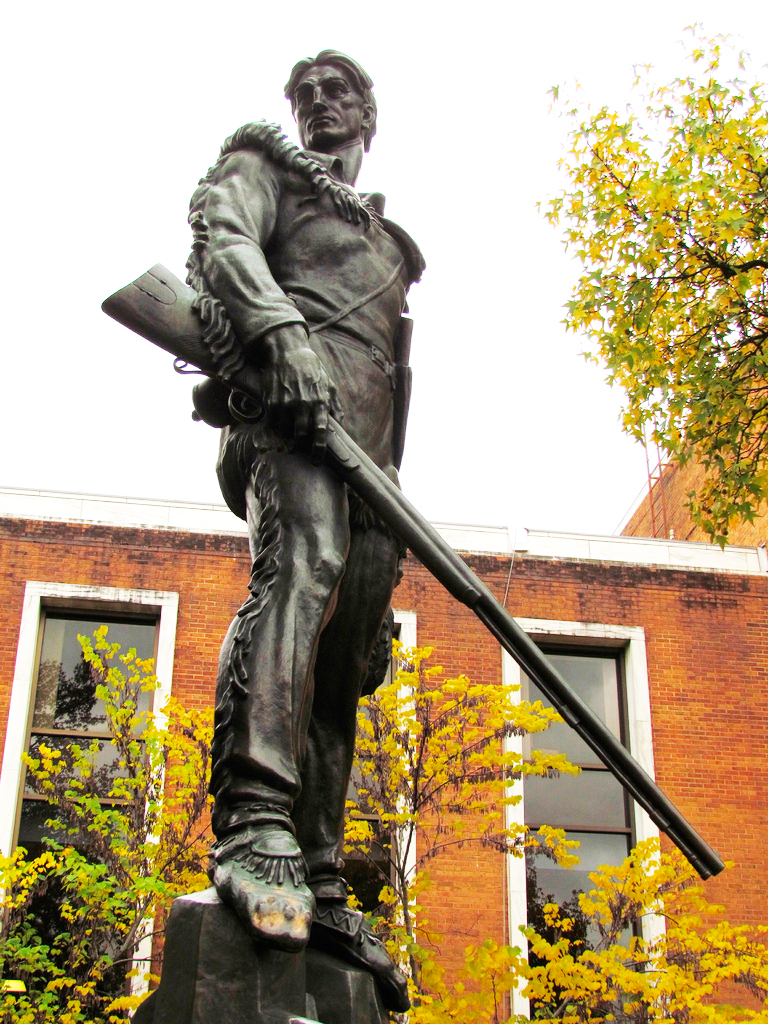
The Mountaineer, West Virginia University, Morgantown, West Virginia

The West Virginia Mountaineer is the official mascot of West Virginia University (WVU). Selected annually since the 1930s from the university's student body, the mascot is a popular tradition at the school. The Mountaineer appears in a buckskin outfit at West Virginia Mountaineers football games, men's and women's basketball matches, and other University-sponsored events.

== History ==
Boyd "Slim" Arnold, the first Mountaineer mascot to don the traditional buckskin uniform. His selection in 1937 marked the beginning of an official process to appoint the mascot annually.

Daily Athenaeum articles indicate that designating individuals to serve as the Mountaineer started as early as 1927. The name is derived from "Mountain State", meaning West Virginia. Clay Crouse was designated that year, followed in 1932 by Burton Crow and then Bill Fahey. It was not until 1934-35 when track runner Lawson Hill was selected that a more stable process was established. By 1937, the Mountaineer was being selected on an annual basis by Mountain Honorary. Beginning in 1934, The Monticola (the WVU yearbook) sponsored a contest to determine the male senior who had contributed most to the university throughout his four years in college. This male was entitled to be “The Mountaineer”. During the next decade the criterion was amended to specify a person who was suitable for the role.

In the 1930s, the unofficial mascot appeared at WVU sporting events carrying a muzzle-loading rifle while wearing a flannel shirt, a sheep or bearskin vest, and a coonskin cap. Volunteers including Burton “Irish” Crow, Lawson Hill, and William “Buckwheat” Jackson made appearances throughout the season.

Boyd H. "Slim" Arnold, a physical education major from Bayard, West Virginia, was the first Mountaineer selected to serve three years in succession (1937–39) and was the longest tenured until Rock Wilson equaled it from 1991 to 1993. During Arnold's tenure, he became the first Mountaineer to wear the now traditional buckskin uniform. Meeting minutes from the late 1930s indicate that a donor gave the Honorary several deerskins, asking that a buckskin costume be made for the Mountaineer.

In 1944, WVU did not choose a Mountaineer mascot due to World War II.

The 1950 Mountaineer Weekend brought about an idea for a Mountaineer mascot statue, raising funds from a carnival held in the Field House (now Stansbury Hall) and subsequent Mountaineer Week celebrations. Proceeds raised allowed for the procurement of a bronze Mountaineer statue, commissioned by Donald De Lue and formally dedicated on October 2, 1971. Today the statue remains situated on the front lawn of the Mountainlair student union.

The Mountaineer was first used in commerce in 1972, and was registered as a U.S. trademark in 1985.

Mountaineers' retired rifles and costumes are housed in a glass case in the Vandalia Lounge of the Mountainlair, located on the downtown campus.

Three women have held the position of West Virginia Mountaineer:

- Natalie Tennant served as the first female Mountaineer in 1990.
- Rebecca Durst in 2009
- Mary Roush in 2022

== Selection ==
The Mountaineer is a member of the student body chosen by the Mountaineer Selection Committee for outstanding enthusiasm, character, service to the community, and academics. The selected Mountaineer receives a tuition waiver or scholarship in return for their service.

== Duties ==
The role has remained substantially unchanged since its origins. The costume is tailored to fit each year's winner, and male Mountaineers customarily grow beards during their tenure, though this is not required. The rifle is a custom-built percussion rifle that since 1977 has been built and maintained by Marvin Wotring (WVU alumnus 1965). This style of rifle requires the user to become schooled in the amount of powder required to fire the charge.

The responsibilities of the Mountaineer mascot are set forth by the Mountaineer Advisory Committee Manual Regulations. The Mountaineer must attend every away and home West Virginia Mountaineers football game, as well as all home men's and women's basketball games. They might also be required to travel with the team as determined by the Department of Intercollegiate Athletics. The Mountaineer leads the football team onto Mountaineer Field every game, firing the rifle into the air. The Mountaineer leads the fans, along with the cheerleaders, on the football field and the basketball court in the Let's Go Mountaineers cheer and other cheers. The mascot is encouraged to attend certain alumni events and community events, and visit the WVU Children's Hospital. The Mountaineer may make close to 400 appearances per year.

He or she is also responsible for the cleaning, care, and handling of the rifle, which no one else is allowed to fire, except for the alternate Mountaineer. The Mountaineer is expected to follow a proper code of conduct at all times. While in costume, the mascot cannot use alcohol or tobacco, accept money or gifts for appearances, or endorse a company or product for profit.

Until 1993 there was no formal term limit for the Mountaineer. That year, a two-year term limit was introduced, and in February 2018 a one-year term limit was imposed by the Mountaineer Advisory Committee. During the COVID-19 pandemic in 2020, the term limit was briefly lifted to ensure a robust experience for the Mountaineer at the time.

== Other schools with a Mountaineer mascot ==
- Appalachian State University
- Berea College
- Eastern Oklahoma State College
- Eastern Oregon University
- Mansfield University
- Mount St. Mary's University
- Schreiner College
- Southern Vermont College
- Western State College

== List of Mountaineers ==
- Clay Crouse – 1927
- Burdette “Irish” Crow – 1932-33
- William “Bill” Fahey – 1933-34
- Lawson M. Hill – 1934-35 (deceased)
- William “Buckwheat” Jackson – 1936-37 (deceased)
- Boyd H. “Slim” Arnold – 1937-39 (deceased)
- Julius W. Singleton Jr. – 1940-1941 (deceased)
- William F. Gott – 1942-43 (deceased)
- (War years – 1943-44)
- Robert L. Carr – 1945
- James G. Couglin – 1946 (deceased)
- Sidney H. Gillis – 1947
- Matthew W. Harrison Jr. – 1948 (deceased)
- John P. Russell – 1949
- Thomas A. Deveny III – 1950
- James Almond – 1951 (deceased)
- Dan B. Fleming – 1952
- Dan R. Oliker – 1953
- John Coyner – 1954 (deceased)
- Fred S. Pattison – 1955 (deceased)
- Larry Reppert – 1956
- James L. McCoy – 1957 (deceased)
- Robert H. Allen – 1958
- David L. Ellis – 1959
- William R. McPherson – 1960 (deceased)
- Jerry S. Sturm – 1961
- William D. Thompson – 1962
- William W. “Buck” Rogers Jr. – 1963
- Edward S. Pritchard – 1964-65 (deceased)
- Kenneth B. Fonville – 1966
- Louis A. Garvin Jr. – 1967
- Frederick G. Reel – 1968, 1969
- Douglas F. Townshend – 1970
- Robert S. Lowe – 1971
- Mark Lothes – 1972
- Stuart A. Wolpert – 1973, 1974
- Junior Taylor – 1975 (deceased)
- Jerome E. Scherer – 1976
- Bruce D. Heisler – 1977
- Richard D. Poling – 1978
- James Campbell – 1979
- Cecil C. Graham – 1980
- Andy M. Mergler – 1981
- Ed R. Cokeley – 1981
- Robert E. Richardson – 1982
- Michael G. Russell – 1983
- Mark A. Boggs – 1984
- Tim S. Nilan – 1985
- Matt P. Zervos – 1986
- Tom E. Dulaney Jr. – 1987
- Dan C. Pearson – 1988
- Benjamin F. White – 1989
- Natalie E. Tennant – 1990
- Rock S. Wilson – 1991, 1992, 1993
- John R. Stemple – 1994, 1995
- Andrew R. Cogar – 1996, 1997
- Brandon S. Flower – 1998, 1999
- Scott W. Moore – 2000, 2001
- Trey Hinrichs – 2002, 2003
- Derek Fincham – 2004, 2005
- Brady Campbell – 2006, 2007
- Michael Squires – 2008
- Rebecca Durst – 2009
- Brock Burwell – 2010, 2011
- Jonathan Kimble – 2012, 2013
- Michael Garcia – 2014, 2015
- Troy Clemons – 2016, 2017
- Trevor Kiess – 2018
- Timothy Eads – 2019
- Colson Glover – 2020, 2021
- Mary Roush – 2022
- Mikel Hager – 2023
- Braden Adkins - 2024
- Cade Kincaid - 2025
- Reese Allen - 2026
