= The Daily Athenaeum =

West Virginia University student newspaper

Daily Athenaeum
- Type: Student newspaper
- Format: Tabloid
- School: West Virginia University
- Owner: West Virginia University
- Publisher: WVU Student Media
- Editor-in-chief: Lauren Taylor
- Managing editor: Anna Goldizen
- Founded: 1887
- Headquarters: Morgantown, West Virginia, U.S.
- Circulation: 12,500
- ISSN: 0011-5371
- Website: The Daily Athenaeum
- Free online archives: https://www.thedaonline.com/latest_edition/

The Daily Athenaeum is the official student newspaper at West Virginia University. Founded in 1887, the paper draws students from all disciplines to contribute original content for publication. It is editorially independent from the university, and also does not have a faculty adviser. The DA is distributed at various locations on campus, as well as around Morgantown, West Virginia, in restaurants and businesses. Content is also available online via its website.

The DA's offices are located at 284 Prospect Street, across the street from Arnold Hall on the Downtown campus. The DA publishes once a week, Wednesdays, throughout the school year, as well updating content every day online. The primary sections of the paper are news, opinion, culture and sports.

== History ==
The Athenaeum (Athe-a-nay-um) has a long tradition of serving the students, faculty, and staff of West Virginia University.

The publication began in 1887 as a literary magazine when classics were popular in college study, hence the name which refers to the forum in ancient Athens where oratory and debate took place. The Athenaeum celebrated its centennial in 1987 with the publication of a special edition.

Soon after journalism instruction began at WVU in the 1920s, the journalism faculty took over the supervision of the Athenaeum, utilizing it as a laboratory newspaper to help teach writing, editing and advertising. The publication took on the appearance of a newspaper and became a weekly. It assumed daily status (five days a week) in 1933.

Over the years, the Athenaeum has improved and grew larger, and hundreds of journalism students worked as reporters and editors. Today the Athenaeum is no longer part of the School of Journalism, as it became completely independent in 1970.

In May 1994, The Daily Athenaeum moved into a new facility located at 284 Prospect Street. A special Building Fee funded construction of this facility.

In May 2016, The Daily Athenaeum announced that it would stop printing Monday through Friday, instead opting to print only Monday, Wednesday and Friday. The newspaper also switched from a broadsheet to a tab layout. This announcement came not long after WVU hired Adell Crowe to head up student media at the school.

In 2020, the paper switched to printing once a week, with campus delivery on Wednesdays and insertion in the Dominion-Post Fridays.

In 2022, Madison Fleck Cooke was hired as the current director of WVU Student Media and main advisor to the paper.

== Rankings and Reviews ==
In 2022, The Daily Athenaeum was recorded as having an average of 137 shares per article published, making it the 7th highest in the U.S.

== Staff ==
The Daily Athenaeum has generally been led by two top editors, the editor-in-chief and managing editor. Appointments to these positions are made by a committee of journalism professors at the school, full-time staff members at the newspaper and students. The appointments generally last one academic year. The following is the most recent history of the newspaper's leadership team.

== Notable alumni ==
- Ken Ward, Jr., environmental reporter

== See also ==
- West Virginia University
- List of college newspapers
