= International Federation of Workers' Education Associations =

The International Federation of Workers' Education Associations (IFWEA) is an international organisation of associations, foundations, non-governmental organisations and trade unions involved in adult education for working people. It is based in Cape Town, South Africa, is an observer at the International Labour Organisation and UNESCO and is a member of SOLIDAR.

== History ==
The idea to form an international federation of educational associations for workers was conceived during World War II, at the annual conference of the United Kingdom Workers' Educational Association. In 1945 a conference for members of workers' educational organisations from a number of countries was held in London, where it was resolved to create an international coalition to support collaboration between organisations.

In October 1947 the International Federation of Workers' Educational Associations (IFWEA) was officially launched at a conference in London where a formal constitution was adopted. Worker representatives from the United Kingdom, Denmark, Finland, France, the Netherlands, Luxembourg, Norway, Switzerland and Sweden attended, while observers from Germany, Poland, Austria, Czechoslovakia and the United States of America were present.

A President and Secretary General were elected, and an Executive Committee was appointed with regional representation. Representation is now regularly modified to reflect the federation's membership.

Over the past 70-odd years membership of IFWEA has increased. As of 2023, IFWEA has affiliates in more than 30 countries including South Africa, Zimbabwe, Nepal, New Zealand, Indonesia, Sri Lanka, Pakistan, Philippines, India, Cambodia, Denmark, Sweden, Norway, Portugal, Iceland, Finland, the United Kingdom, Bulgaria, Belgium, Bolivia, Peru and the United States of America.

IFWEA helps new organisations, particularly in developing countries, and provides a global space for worker educators to share resources and advance the role of trade unions and community struggles in the transformation of society. An important role is to facilitate information exchanges between members.

== Purpose ==
The purpose of IFWEA is to “advance the education of the public with respect to the democratic labour movement; and to promote the carrying out of free and voluntary educational work, according to the principles of solidarity and cooperation, justice and equality, and democracy and freedom”.

== Governance ==
The highest decision making assembly in IFWEA is the quadrennial International General Conference. The General Secretary, President and Executive Committee are elected at this conference. The 22nd IFWEA General Conference was held in Lima, Peru in 2015, the 23rd IFWEA General Conference was held in Cape Town, South Africa in 2019 and the 24th IFWEA General Conference was held in Cape Town, South Africa in 2023.

The role of the IFWEA Secretariat is to stimulate the development of a democratic workers’ education movement, by providing contact between member organisations, assisting with the development of partnerships, and promoting best practice in educational design and delivery through the provision of education resources, web communication and learning events such as workshops, seminars and conferences. The IFWEA Secretariat was registered in Cape Town, South Africa in 2009, after the election of IFWEA General Secretary Sahra Ryklief in December 2007. Previously it had been registered in the UK with the Secretariat in Manchester, and prior to that, it was hosted by the AOF Norway, with the Secretariat in Oslo.

Archival records of IFWEA 1945 to 1986 are held at the Trades Union Congress (TUC) Library Collections and University Archives at London Metropolitan University, reference code GB 1924 IFWEA. Current records are held at the Institute of The Hague.

== Programmes ==
=== Foundation Skills for Social Change Certificate Programme ===
The Foundation Skills for Social Change Certificate Programme (FSSC) provides courses aimed at grassroots leaders in community organisations and trade unions. Past programmes have included courses on youth civic and political mobilisation; participatory learning and research methods; women’s leadership; and organising for the social protection of vulnerable workers. The courses are designed by IFWEA affiliates who have expertise in these fields.

=== Study Circles for Social Change Programme ===
The Study Circles for Social Change Programme (SCSC) promotes study circles by training potential study circle facilitators. The study circles promote collective learning. The programme also brings study circle facilitators from different countries together online to share information on a global basis. Programmes have also included film clubs, dance clubs and theatre groups for social change.

=== Youth Global Awareness Programme ===
The annual Youth Global Awareness Programme (YGAP) run by IFWEA brings together young educators, trade union and youth leaders from around the globe. The programme, run in Cape Town, South Africa, raises awareness around global worker education issues. It is designed to mentor and develop young leaders in the field of worker education.

=== Online Labour Academy ===
The Online Labour Academy is an internet-based resource offering a range of education courses to the labour movement. Online educators can share materials, curricular and information on local, regional and international platforms.
