= Labor Studies Journal =

Academic labour journal

- Discipline: Industrial relations; Labor studies
- Language: English
- Edited by: Robert Bruno, Victor Devinatz

Publication details
- History: 1998-present
- Publisher: SAGE Publications on behalf of the United Association for Labor Education
- Frequency: Quarterly

Standard abbreviations
- ISO 4: Labor Stud. J.

Indexing
- ISSN: 0160-449X
- LCCN: 79642926
- OCLC no.: 663316314

Links
- Journal homepage; Online access; Online archive; Journal page at Project MUSE

Labor Studies Journal is a quarterly peer-reviewed academic journal covering research in the field of labor studies. Its editors-in-chief are Robert Bruno (University of Illinois) and Victor Devinatz (Illinois State University). It was established in 1998 and is published by SAGE Publications on behalf of the United Association for Labor Education.

== Abstracting and indexing ==
The journal is abstracted and indexed in Scopus and Sociological Abstracts.
