= National Register of Historic Places listings in Monongalia County, West Virginia =

Location of Monongalia County in West Virginia

This is a list of the National Register of Historic Places listings in Monongalia County, West Virginia.

This is intended to be a complete list of the properties and districts on the National Register of Historic Places in Monongalia County, West Virginia, United States. The locations of National Register properties and districts for which the latitude and longitude coordinates are included below, may be seen in an online map.

There are 48 properties and districts listed on the National Register in the county, 1 of which is a National Historic Landmark.

This National Park Service list is complete through NPS recent listings posted August 21, 2026.

Contents: Counties in West Virginia

Barbour - Berkeley - Boone - Braxton - Brooke - Cabell - Calhoun - Clay - Doddridge - Fayette - Gilmer - Grant - Greenbrier - Hampshire - Hancock - Hardy - Harrison - Jackson - Jefferson - Kanawha - Lewis - Lincoln - Logan - Marion - Marshall - Mason - McDowell - Mercer - Mineral - Mingo - Monongalia - Monroe - Morgan - Nicholas - Ohio - Pendleton - Pleasants - Pocahontas - Preston - Putnam - Raleigh - Randolph - Ritchie - Roane - Summers - Taylor - Tucker - Tyler - Upshur - Wayne - Webster - Wetzel - Wirt - Wood - Wyoming

== Current listings ==
	Name on the Register	Image	Date listed	Location	City or town	Description
1	D.I.B. Anderson Farm	D.I.B. Anderson Farm	March 25, 1994 (#94000213)	3333 Collins Ferry Rd. 39°39′36″N 79°58′27″W	Morgantown	
2	Brown Building	Brown Building	July 8, 1985 (#85001514)	295 High St. 39°37′47″N 79°57′22″W	Morgantown	
3	Camp Rhododendron	Camp Rhododendron	May 15, 1991 (#91000545)	Off Interstate 68 8 mi (13 km) east of Morgantown; 39°38′18″N 79°48′56″W	Morgantown	
4	Chancery Hill Historic District	Chancery Hill Historic District	December 3, 1999 (#99001401)	Roughly bounded by S. High St., Oak Grove Cemetery, Waitman, Allison, and Simpson Sts. and 256 Prairie Ave. 39°37′20″N 79°57′43″W	Morgantown	The 2001 boundary increase added the Alexander Wade House to the district.
5	Judge Frank Cox House	Judge Frank Cox House	January 12, 1984 (#84003626)	206 Spruce St. 39°37′42″N 79°57′20″W	Morgantown	
6	Deckers Creek Wall		March 26, 2025 (#100007609)	Deckers Creek; 39°37′29″N 79°56′42″W	Morgantown	
7	Dents Run Covered Bridge	Dents Run Covered Bridge	June 4, 1981 (#81000604)	County Route 43/4 near junction of County Route 43 crossing Dents Run; 39°37′26″N 80°02′24″W	Laurel Point	
8	Dering Building	Dering Building	November 4, 1994 (#94001288)	175-177 Walnut St. 39°37′49″N 79°57′25″W	Morgantown	
9	Downtown Morgantown Historic District	Downtown Morgantown Historic District	May 2, 1996 (#96000441)	Roughly bounded by Chestnut and Spruce Sts. between Foundry and Willey Sts. 39°37′47″N 79°57′26″W	Morgantown	
10	Easton Roller Mill	Easton Roller Mill	December 19, 1978 (#78002806)	Near Easton Hill on County Route 119/17; 39°39′00″N 79°54′45″W	Morgantown	
11	Eighth Street Stone Retaining Walls		March 26, 2025 (#100007610)	305 and 321 8th St. 39°38′39″N 79°57′43″W	Morgantown	
12	Ford House	Ford House	November 15, 1993 (#93001227)	310 Ford St. 39°37′18″N 79°57′45″W	Morgantown	
13	Fourth Ward School	Fourth Ward School	August 25, 2004 (#04000914)	287 Eureka Dr. 39°38′25″N 79°56′56″W	Morgantown	
14	Greenmont Historic District	Greenmont Historic District	February 2, 2005 (#04001597)	Roughly bounded by Arlington, Front, Conn, White Ave., Posten Ave., Kingwood St., and Decker Ave. 39°37′31″N 79°57′00″W	Morgantown	
15	Hackney House	Hackney House	July 1, 1999 (#99000789)	89 Kingwood St. 39°37′39″N 79°57′08″W	Morgantown	
16	Hamilton Farm Petroglyphs	Hamilton Farm Petroglyphs	August 7, 1974 (#74002015)	Southeast of Ringgold on U.S. Route 119; 39°33′34″N 79°56′16″W	Ringgold	
17	Harmony Grove Meeting House	Harmony Grove Meeting House	September 16, 1983 (#83003245)	Off Interstate 79; 39°36′12″N 79°59′25″W	Harmony Grove	
18	Harner Homestead	Harner Homestead	January 12, 1984 (#84003629)	1818 Listravia St. 39°37′26″N 79°55′14″W	Morgantown	
19	Henry Clay Furnace	Henry Clay Furnace	January 26, 1970 (#70000658)	Southeast of Cheat Neck in Coopers Rock State Forest; 39°38′56″N 79°49′07″W	Cheat Neck	
20	Kern's Fort	Kern's Fort	April 9, 1993 (#93000225)	305 Dewey St. 39°37′31″N 79°56′59″W	Morgantown	
21	Kincaid and Arnett Feed and Flour Building	Kincaid and Arnett Feed and Flour Building	July 21, 1995 (#95000873)	156 Clay St. 39°37′31″N 79°57′50″W	Morgantown	
22	Lynch Chapel United Methodist Church	Lynch Chapel United Methodist Church	November 15, 2006 (#06001046)	Junction of County Routes 32 and 41; 39°37′23″N 80°05′05″W	Morgantown	
23	Mason and Dixon Survey Terminal Point	Mason and Dixon Survey Terminal Point	June 25, 1973 (#73001922)	2.25 mi (3.62 km) northeast of Pentress on County Route 39; 39°43′16″N 80°07′07″W	Pentress	Extends into Perry Township in Greene County, Pennsylvania
24	Men's Hall	Men's Hall	February 5, 1990 (#89002309)	Prospect and High Sts. 39°37′59″N 79°57′10″W	Morgantown	
25	Metropolitan Theatre	Metropolitan Theatre	January 12, 1984 (#84003631)	371 S. High St. 39°37′51″N 79°57′20″W	Morgantown	
26	Monongalia County Courthouse	Monongalia County Courthouse	July 8, 1985 (#85001525)	243 High St. 39°37′47″N 79°57′26″W	Morgantown	
27	Elizabeth Moore Hall	Elizabeth Moore Hall	December 19, 1985 (#85003208)	University Ave. 39°38′06″N 79°57′20″W	Morgantown	
28	Morgantown Green Book Historic District		November 13, 2024 (#100011009)	2 Cayton Street, 3 Cayton Street, and 1046 College Avenue; 39°38′14″N 79°56′59″W	Morgantown	
29	Morgantown Wharf and Warehouse Historic District	Morgantown Wharf and Warehouse Historic District	December 16, 1998 (#98001466)	Roughly along the Monongahela River from Warren St. to Walnut St. 39°37′42″N 79°57′39″W	Morgantown	
30	Oglebay Hall	Oglebay Hall	December 19, 1985 (#85003207)	University Ave. 39°38′14″N 79°57′16″W	Morgantown	
31	Old Morgantown Post Office	Old Morgantown Post Office	March 28, 1979 (#79002593)	107 High St. 39°37′41″N 79°57′29″W	Morgantown	
32	Old Stone House	Old Stone House	December 27, 1972 (#72001290)	Chestnut St. 39°37′50″N 79°57′24″W	Morgantown	
33	Old Watson Homestead House	Old Watson Homestead House	December 7, 1984 (#84003871)	County Route 73; 39°31′46″N 80°02′38″W	Smithtown	
34	Purinton House	Purinton House	December 19, 1985 (#85003206)	University Ave. 39°38′05″N 79°57′20″W	Morgantown	
35	Richwood Avenue Wall		March 26, 2025 (#100007608)	Richwood Ave. along Whitmore Park; 39°37′44″N 79°56′47″W	Morgantown	
36	Rogers House	Rogers House	December 4, 1984 (#84000683)	293 Willey St. 39°37′53″N 79°57′09″W	Morgantown	
37	St. Mary's Orthodox Church	St. Mary's Orthodox Church	February 3, 1988 (#87002525)	W. Park and Holland Aves. 39°38′03″N 79°57′43″W	Westover	
38	Second Ward Negro Elementary School	Second Ward Negro Elementary School	July 28, 1992 (#92000896)	Junction of White and Posten Aves. 39°37′17″N 79°56′57″W	Morgantown	
39	Seneca Glass Company Building	Seneca Glass Company Building	December 19, 1985 (#85003214)	709 Beechurst Ave. 39°38′28″N 79°57′44″W	Morgantown	
40	South Park Historic District	South Park Historic District	July 23, 1990 (#90001054)	Roughly bounded by Elgin St., Kingwood St., Cobun Ave., Prairie Ave., Jefferson St., Lincoln Ave., and Grand St. 39°37′21″N 79°57′08″W	Morgantown	
41	Stalnaker Hall	Stalnaker Hall	December 19, 1985 (#85003205)	Maiden Ln. 39°38′08″N 79°57′11″W	Morgantown	
42	Stewart Hall	Stewart Hall	June 25, 1980 (#80004034)	West Virginia University campus 39°38′03″N 79°57′16″W	Morgantown	
43	Vance Farmhouse	Vance Farmhouse	November 21, 1991 (#91001731)	1535 Mileground, West Virginia University; 39°38′23″N 79°56′13″W	Morgantown	
44	Alexander Wade House	Alexander Wade House	October 15, 1966 (#66000752)	256 Prairie St. 39°37′29″N 79°57′30″W	Morgantown	
45	Walters House	Walters House	August 18, 1983 (#83003246)	221 Willey St. 39°37′55″N 79°57′13″W	Morgantown	
46	Waitman T. Willey House	Waitman T. Willey House	April 15, 1982 (#82004327)	128 Wagner Rd. 39°37′30″N 79°57′34″W	Morgantown	
47	Women's Christian Temperance Union Community Building	Women's Christian Temperance Union Community Building	October 30, 1985 (#85003406)	160 Fayette St. 39°37′52″N 79°57′22″W	Morgantown	
48	Woodburn Circle	Woodburn Circle	December 4, 1974 (#74002014)	University Ave., West Virginia University; 39°38′09″N 79°57′18″W	Morgantown	

== See also ==
- List of National Historic Landmarks in West Virginia
- National Register of Historic Places listings in West Virginia
