= Harmony Grove =

Harmony Grove may refer to:

- Harmony Grove, California, a census designated place in San Diego County
- Harmony Grove, West Virginia, an unincorporated community in Monongalia County
- Harmony Grove, Wisconsin, an unincorporated community in Columbia County
- Harmony Grove Cemetery, in Salem, Massachusetts
- Harmony Grove High School (disambiguation), multiple schools
