= Alexander Wade =

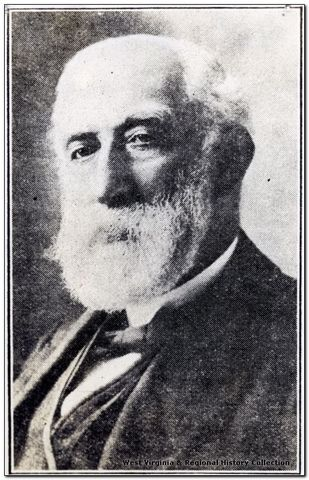
Photo from Wade family archives

Alexander L. Wade (February 1, 1832 – May 2, 1904) was an American educator. Alexander Luark Wade was born in Rushville, Indiana, to George Wade III and Ann Luark Wade on February 1, 1832. He moved to Monongalia County (then Virginia) when he was a small child. He married Esther "Hettie" Sanders in 1854. Alexander and Hettie had six children, all of whom lived to adulthood.

== Early career ==
Wade began teaching in rural schools at the age of 16. He served as a school principal and Superintendent of Monongalia County Schools. In 1874, he developed a system of grade promotional exams and graduations for West Virginia schools that allowed rural children to participate more efficiently. Wade's plan also outlined the fundamentals of the school formation itself.

== Travel ==
Wade then spent many years traveling around the country speaking to school districts about developing his plan in their locations. At the National Educational Association at Philadelphia in July, 1879, the following resolution was adopted by the highest educational body in America: 'Resolved, That the attention of the State superintendents of public instruction throughout the United States be called to the propriety of adopting a graduating system for country schools.' His plan was widely adapted throughout the country and forms the basis of the standardized progression from grades 1-12 utilized in the majority of American schools today.

His book A Graduating System for Country Schools was originally published in 1881. Copies of this manual are still in print and in the public domain and are still in use around the world in underdeveloped nations to help establish a working foundation for rural school systems. The latest edition was published in 2018.

== Alexander Wade House ==
The Alexander Wade House in Morgantown, West Virginia is located on Prairie Avenue at Wagner Road. It was originally constructed in 1860 for Judge Edward C. Bunker. At the time, and for almost the entire residence of Alexander Wade, the house was essentially a simple, Greek Revival mass. Rectangular in shape, it was constructed of brick laid in common bond on a hewn-stone foundation. The structure had a classic, one-story portico and three-windowed front facade with stone sills and lintels at all openings. Change was first made in 1901 when the bay productions were added to each side. Until the death of Wade in 1904, there were no other major changes to the house. The home is still privately owned and has been converted into three apartments. It was declared a U.S. National Historic Landmark due to the significance of his work, and is also a contributing property of the Chancery Hill Historic District, which also holds Oak Grove Cemetery.

== Academic writing ==
In addition to his academic writing for journals and magazines, Alexander Wade also wrote a book on choosing a spouse and maintaining a happy marriage. This book, entitled How to Make the Honeymoon Last Through Life, was published by L.B. Lipincott Company of Philadelphia in 1903.

Alexander L. Wade died on May 2, 1904, in Richmond, Virginia, while visiting friends and being treated for an unknown stomach ailment. His estate was divided equally among his children. His collection of religious books and journals were bequeathed to the West Virginia Methodist Episcopal Seminary in Buckhannon (now West Virginia Wesleyan College).

He is buried in Oak Grove Cemetery in Morgantown, along with three of his children. During his lifetime, Alexander Wade donated a portion of the land adjacent to his home on Prairie Avenue to Monongalia County Schools. Morgantown High School was built on this property in 1927 and remains in this location today (2022).
