= Old Watson Homestead House =

Historic house in West Virginia, United States

- U.S. National Register of Historic Places
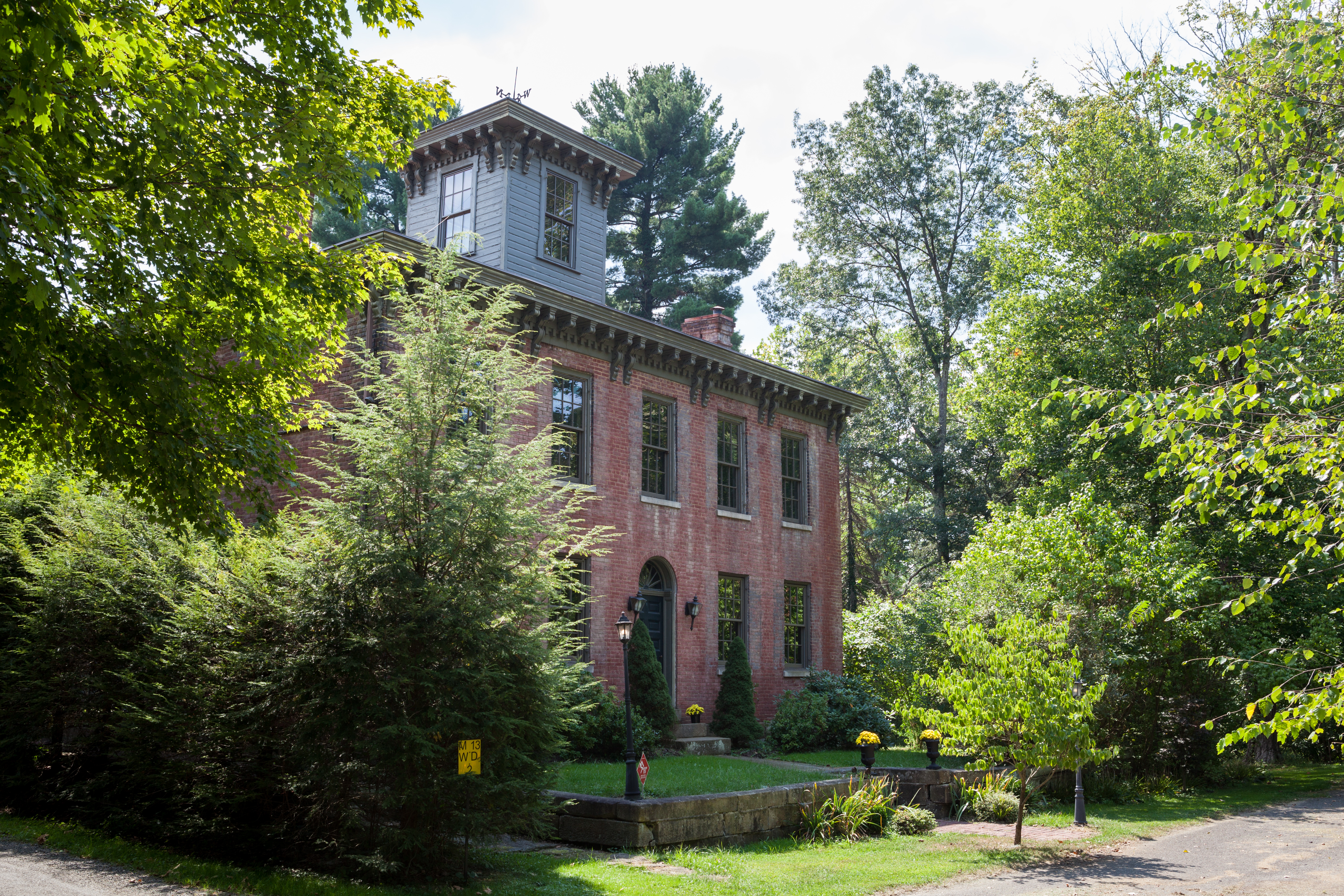
- Front of the house in 2015

- Location within West Virginia Location within the United States
- Location: County Route 73, Smithtown, West Virginia
- Coordinates: 39°31′46″N 80°2′38″W
- Area: 5.8 acres (2.3 ha)
- Built: 1803
- Architect: Riggs, Isaac
- Architectural style: Federal, Italianate,
- NRHP reference No.: 84003871
- Added to NRHP: December 7, 1984

Old Watson Homestead House, also known as Rowe Residence, is a historic home located at Smithtown, Monongalia County, West Virginia. It is a two-story, L-shaped Federal style brick dwelling with Italianate details. The original house was built about 1803, with two additions, one completed about 1843 and another in the late 1850s. It is one of Monongalia County's oldest and most significant homes.

It was listed on the National Register of Historic Places in 1984.
