= Second Ward Negro Elementary School =

- U.S. National Register of Historic Places
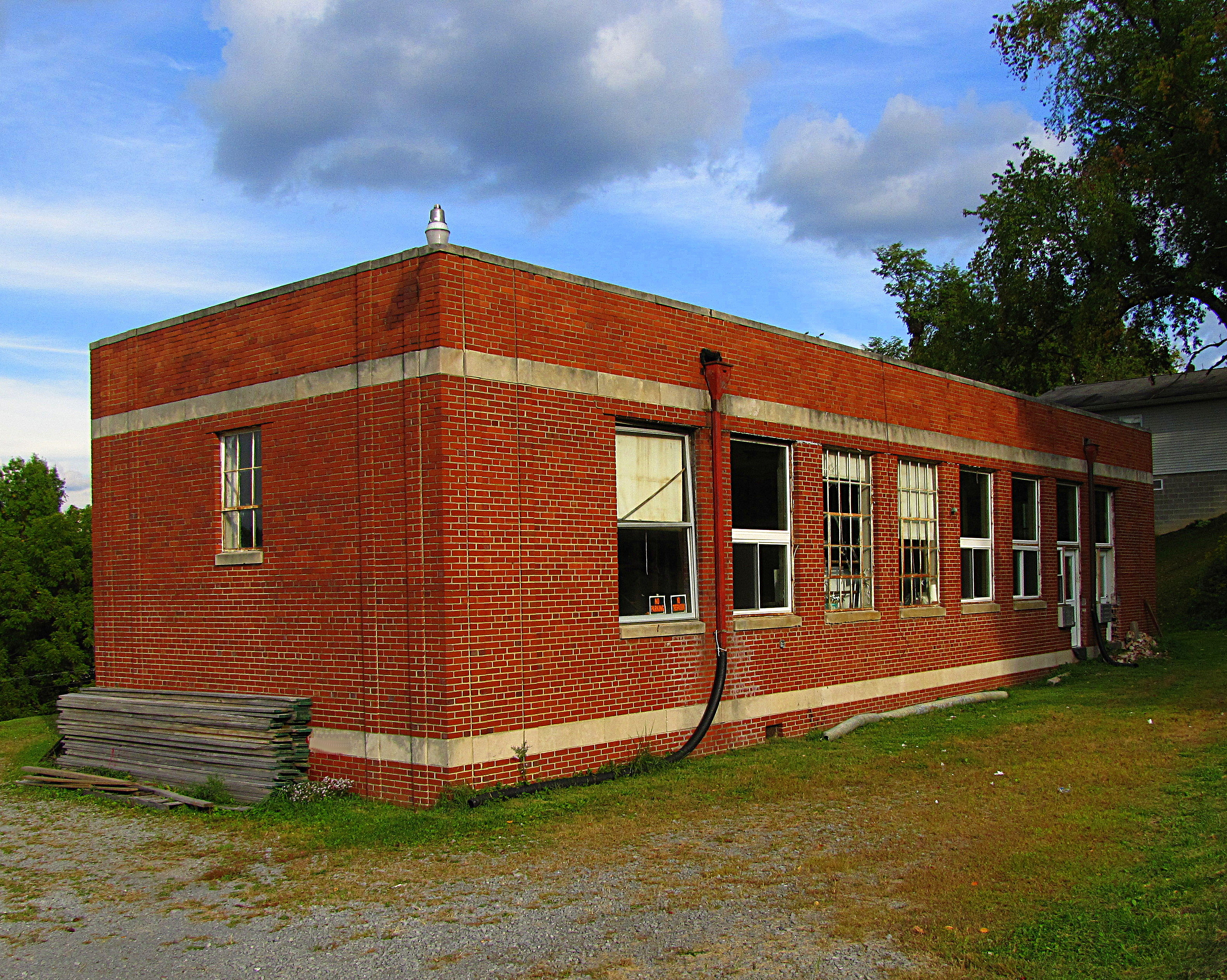

- Location within West Virginia Location within the United States
- Location: Jct. of White and Posten Aves., Morgantown, West Virginia
- Coordinates: 39°37′17″N 79°56′57″W
- Area: 1.9 acres (0.77 ha)
- Built: 1939
- Architect: Tucker & Silling; Russell, John W.
- Architectural style: Art Deco
- NRHP reference No.: 92000896
- Added to NRHP: July 28, 1992

Second Ward Negro Elementary School, also known as the Second Ward Annex, is a historic school building located at Morgantown, Monongalia County, West Virginia. It was built in 1938–1939, and is a one-story, plus basement, T-shaped brick building in the Art Deco style. It sits on a sandstone foundation. Funds for the building's construction were provided by the Works Progress Administration. It functioned as a school for African American students and a community center until the end of segregation in 1954. The building reopened as a school annex and Instructional Materials Center in the 1960s, but ceased being used as a school in 1993.

It was listed on the National Register of Historic Places in 1992. It is located in the Greenmont Historic District, listed in 2005.
