= Alexander Wade House =

Historic house in West Virginia, United States

- U.S. National Register of Historic Places
- U.S. National Historic Landmark
- U.S. Historic district – Contributing property
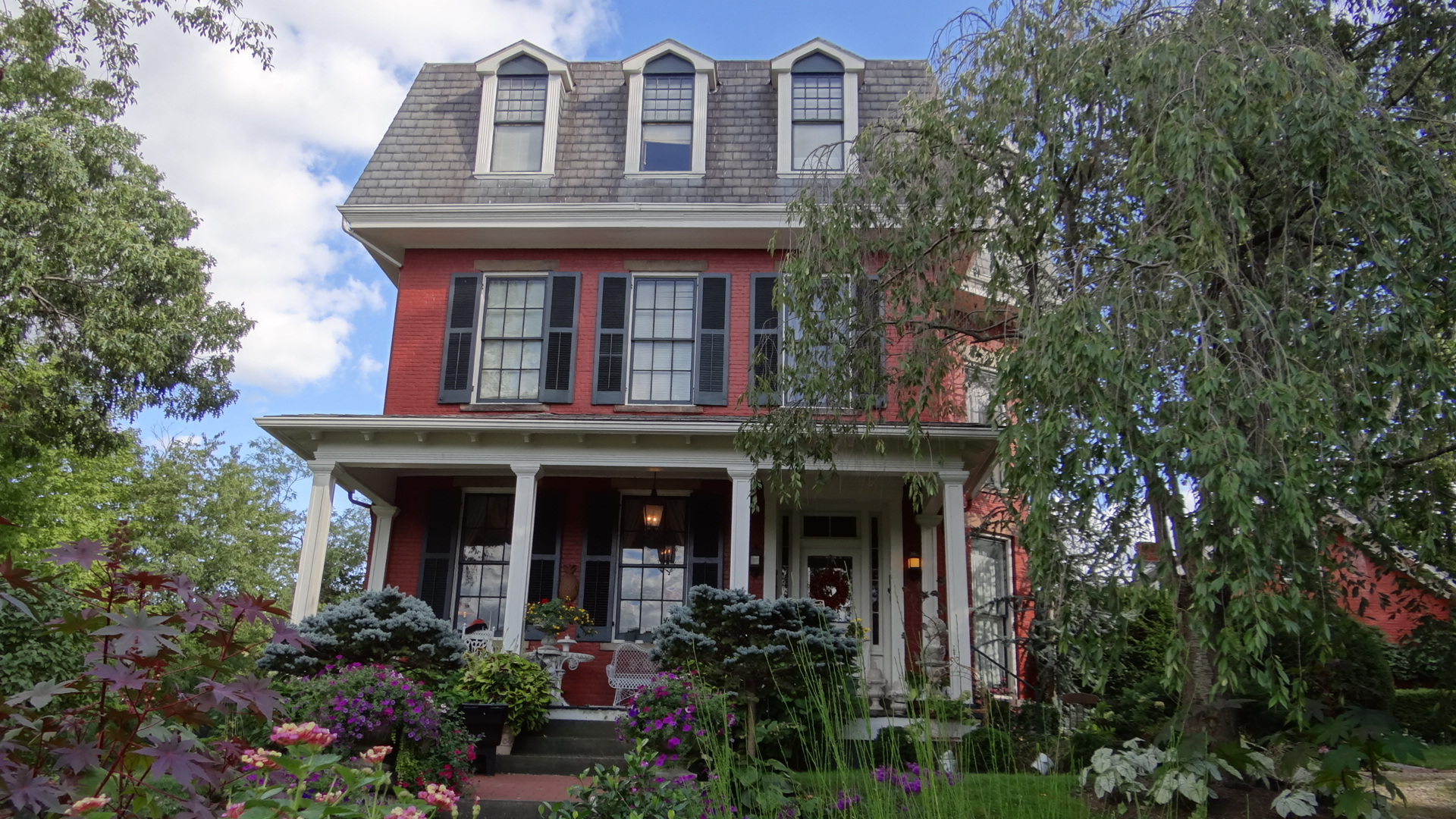
- Alexander Wade House, September 2012

- Location within West Virginia Location within the United States
- Location: 256 Prairie St., Morgantown, West Virginia
- Coordinates: 39°37′29″N 79°57′30″W
- Area: less than one acre
- Built: 1860
- Architectural style: Mixed (more Than 2 Styles From Different Periods)
- Part of: Chancery Hill Historic District (2001 increase) (ID01001405)
- NRHP reference No.: 66000752

Significant dates
- Added to NRHP: October 15, 1966
- Designated NHL: December 21, 1965
- Designated CP: November 29, 2001

The Alexander Wade House is a historic house at 256 Prairie Street in Morgantown, West Virginia. Built in 1860, it was the home of educator Alexander Wade (1832-1904) from 1872 until his death. Wade is credited with developing a system of grade promotional exams and graduations that was widely adopted in the late 19th century. The house was declared a U.S. National Historic Landmark in 1965.

== Description and history ==
The Alexander Wade House is located south of downtown Morgantown in the city's Chancery Hill area, just east of the junction of Prairie Avenue and Wagner Road. It is a 2 1/2-story brick building, with a dormered mansard roof. Its main facade is three bays wide, with a single-story porch extending across the front, supported by paneled square columns. Windows are set in rectangular openings, with stone sills and lintels.

The house was built in 1860 for Judge Edward Bunker. At that time, it had a more Greek Revival appearance, with a gabled roof; the mansard roof was added in 1911, when the building was divided into apartments. The house was purchased in 1872 by Alexander Wade, an educator native to Maryland. As the superintendent of Monongalia County schools, Wade experimented with a system of grading and promotional examinations that successfully normalized the progress of children through rural schools. Wade documented his ideas and presented them to the National Education Association in 1879, where they met with approval and were eventually widely adopted by school systems nationwide. Wade was also an early advocate favoring adoption of the metric system in the United States.

== See also ==
- List of National Historic Landmarks in West Virginia
- National Register of Historic Places listings in Monongalia County, West Virginia
- Wadestown, West Virginia, namesake of Thomas B. Wade (1787-1869), Alexander's first cousin, once removed.
