= D.I.B. Anderson Farm =

Historic house in West Virginia, United States

- U.S. National Register of Historic Places
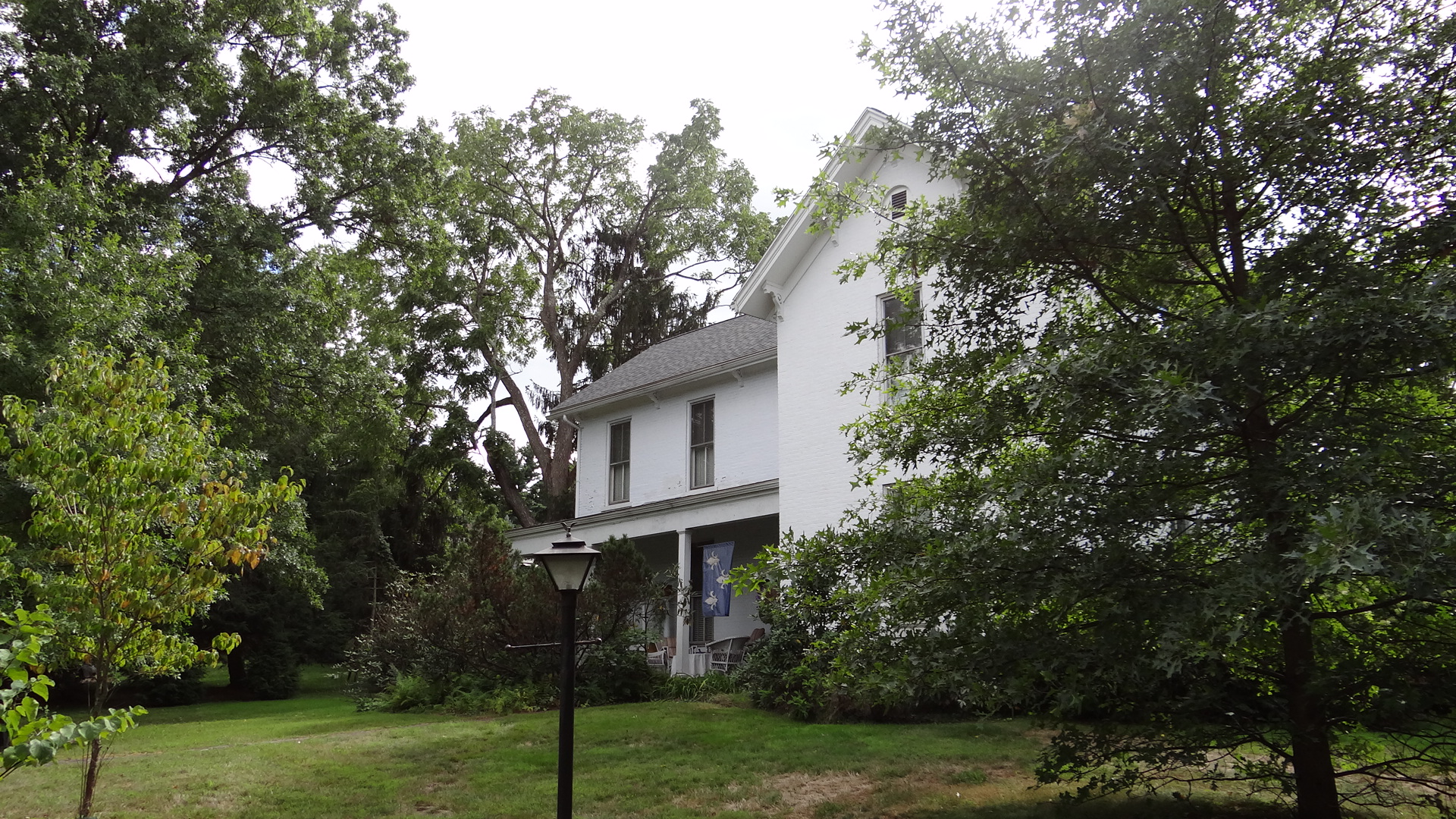
- D.I.B. Anderson Farmhouse, September 2012

- Location within West Virginia Location within the United States
- Location: 3333 Collins Ferry Rd., Morgantown, West Virginia
- Coordinates: 39°39′36″N 79°58′27″W
- Area: 14,067 acres (5,693 ha)
- Built: 1866
- Architectural style: vernacular Italianate
- NRHP reference No.: 94000213
- Added to NRHP: March 25, 1994

D.I.B. Anderson Farm, also known as the D.I.B. Anderson House and Chauncey M. Price House, is a historic home located in Morgantown, Monongalia County, West Virginia. It was built about 1866, and is a two-story, asymmetrical brick farmhouse in a vernacular Italianate style. It features a one-story front porch and a second story "sleeping porch." Also on the property is a contributing ice house and summer kitchen building built of hand made bricks, and a cut sandstone well house.

It was listed on the National Register of Historic Places in 1994.
