= Purinton House =

Historic house in West Virginia, United States

- U.S. National Register of Historic Places
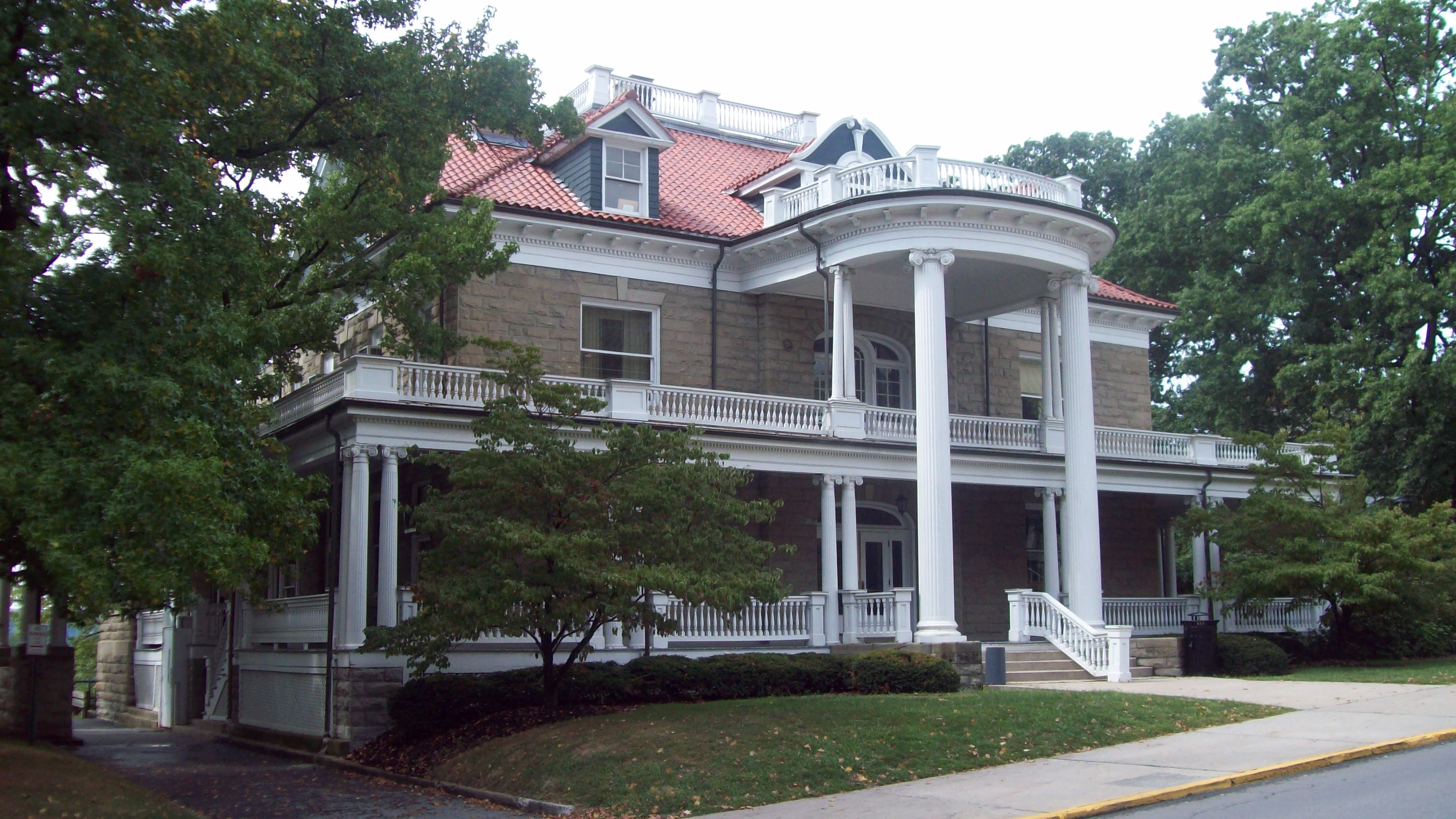
- Purinton House, September 2012

- Location within West Virginia Location within the United States
- Location: University Ave., Morgantown, West Virginia
- Coordinates: 39°38′5″N 79°57′20″W
- Area: 0.3 acres (0.12 ha)
- Built: 1904
- Architect: Fulton, J. Charles
- Architectural style: Classical Revival, Colonial Revival
- MPS: West Virginia University Neo-Classical Revival Buildings TR
- NRHP reference No.: 85003206
- Added to NRHP: December 19, 1985

Purinton House is a historic home associated with the West Virginia University and located at Morgantown, Monongalia County, West Virginia. It was built in 1904, and is a 2 1/2-story masonry dwelling with Classical Revival and Colonial Revival style features. It features a large wraparound porch whose hip roof is supported by Ionic order columns. The porch roof is topped by a balustrade. The roof is topped by a balustraded deck and widow's walk. It served as the on-campus residence for university presidents from 1905 to 1967. On November 2, 1911, President William Howard Taft delivered the address "World Wide Speech," from the front porch of Purinton House.

It was listed on the National Register of Historic Places in 1985.
