= St. Mary's Orthodox Church (West Virginia) =

Historic church in West Virginia, United States

- U.S. National Register of Historic Places
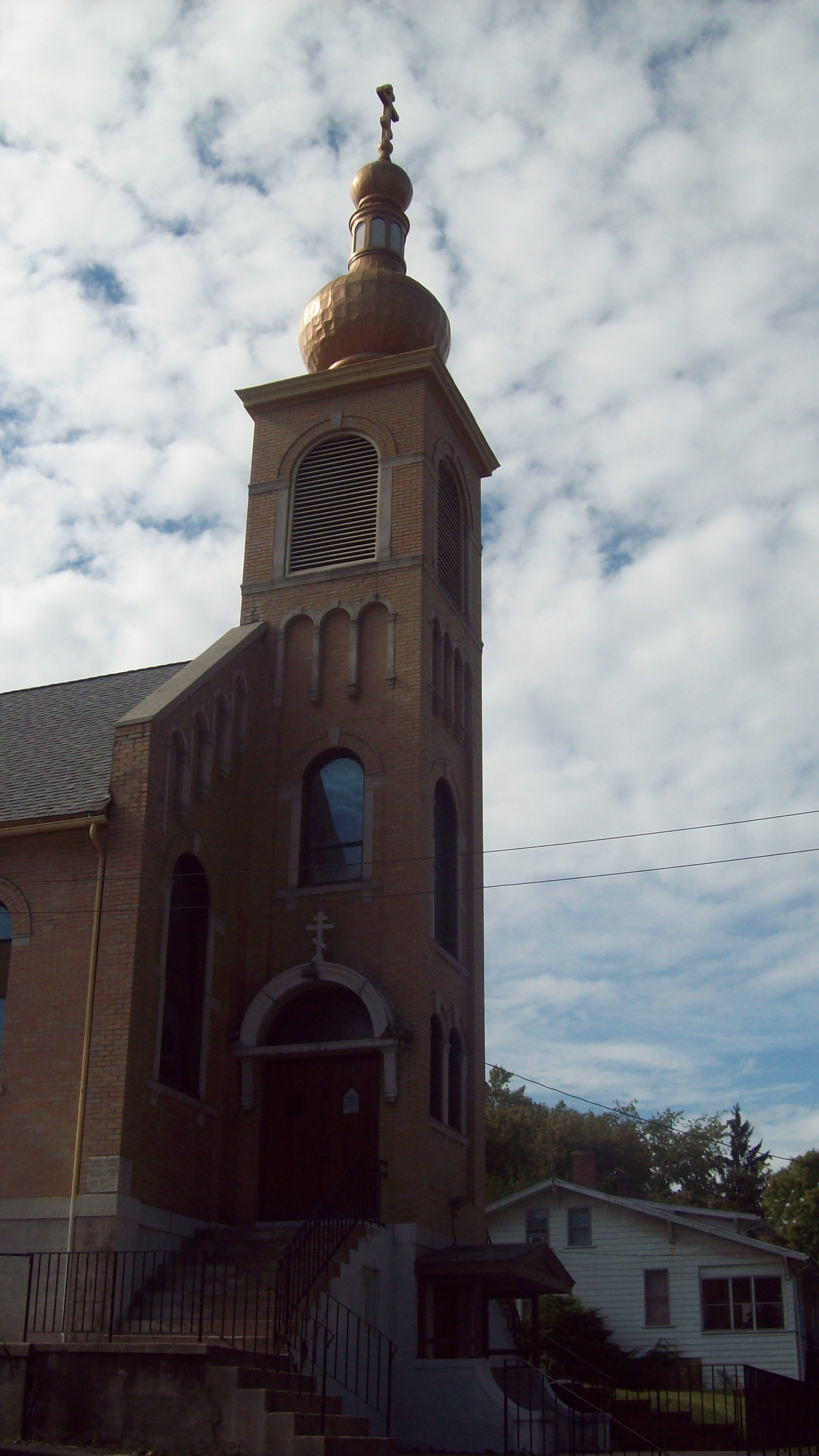
- St. Mary's Orthodox Church, September 2012

- Location within West Virginia Location within the United States
- Location: West Park and Holland Aves., Westover, West Virginia
- Coordinates: 39°38′3″N 79°57′43″W
- Area: less than one acre
- Built: 1923
- Architectural style: Exotic; Byzantine Revival
- NRHP reference No.: 87002525
- Added to NRHP: February 3, 1988

St. Mary's Orthodox Church, originally known as Nativity of the Most Holy Mother of God Russian Orthodox Church, is a historic church of the American Carpatho-Russian Orthodox Diocese located at the intersection of West Park and Holland Avenues in Westover, Monongalia County, West Virginia. It was also known as St. Michael the Archangel Church and St. Mary's Capatho-Russian Orthodox Greek Catholic Church.

The building itself was built in the 19th century and originally housed the Westover Methodist Church. It was later sold to the Orthodox Church, at which time it underwent significant alterations to bring it to the architectural standards necessary for an Orthodox house of worship. It was dedicated as an Orthodox church on September 8, 1923 (hence its dedication to the Nativity of the Virgin Mary, which feast day falls on that date). It is a yellow brick building on a high foundation of textured concrete block.

It was listed on the National Register of Historic Places in 1988.
