= Harmony Grove High School =

Harmony Grove High School may refer to:

- Harmony Grove High School (Benton, Arkansas) in Benton, Arkansas
- Harmony Grove High School (Camden, Arkansas) in Camden, Arkansas

== See also ==
- Grove High School (disambiguation)
