= Harmony Grove Meeting House =

Historic church in West Virginia, United States

- U.S. National Register of Historic Places
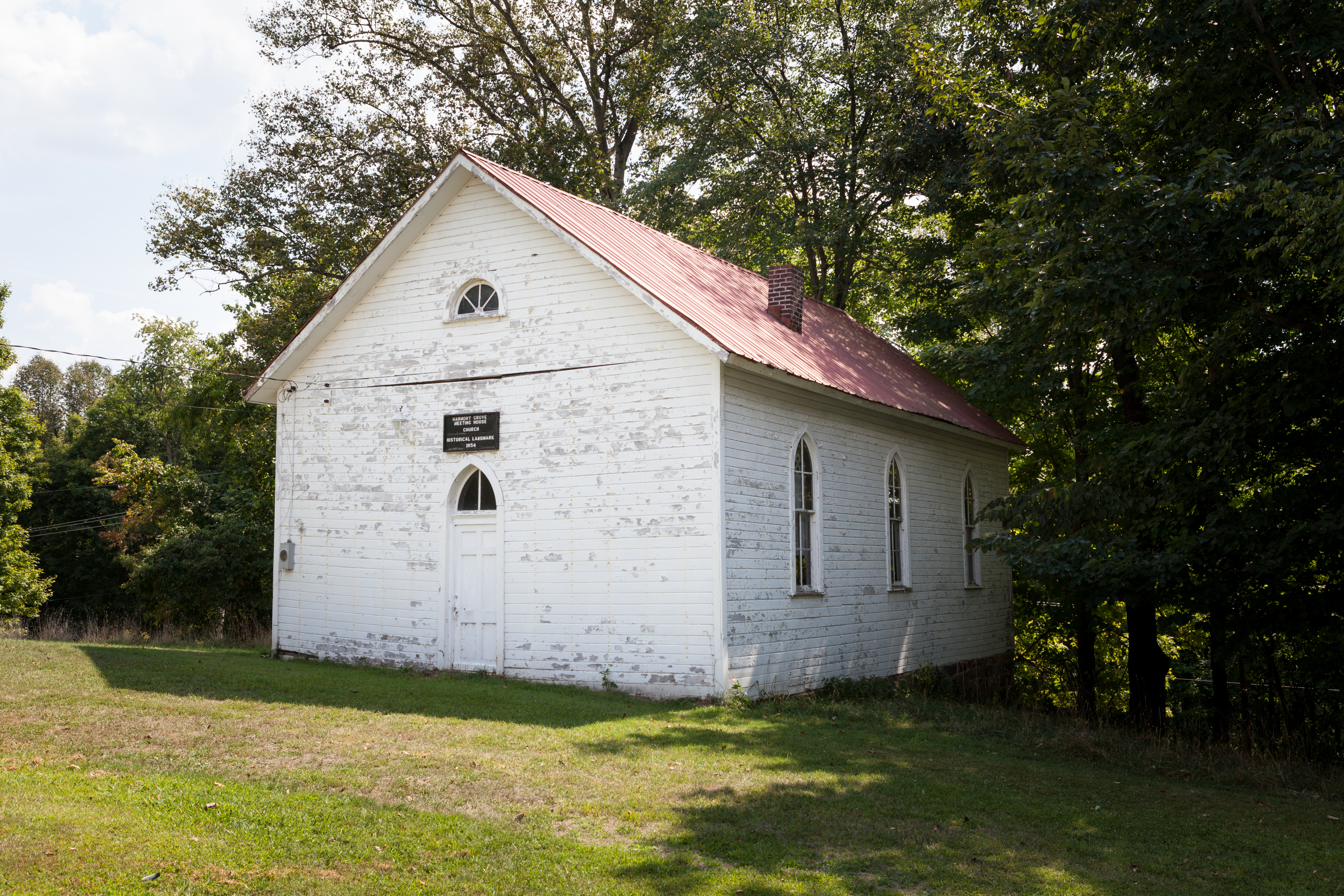
- Looking south

- Location within West Virginia Location within the United States
- Location: off I-79, Harmony Grove, West Virginia
- Coordinates: 39°36′12″N 79°59′25″W
- Area: less than one acre
- NRHP reference No.: 83003245
- Added to NRHP: September 16, 1983

Harmony Grove Meeting House, also known as Harmony Grove Church, is a historic church off I-79 in Harmony Grove, Monongalia County, West Virginia. It was built in 1854, and is a small, one-story wood-frame building. It measures 20 feet wide and 50 feet long. It sits on a foundation of rough-cut stone blocks. It is the oldest unaltered church building in Monongalia County.

The church was built by Presbyterians, Baptists and Methodists. The deed for the land apportioned one Sunday per month to each denomination, leaving the fourth and fifth Sundays for "any Protestant Minister of good standing in his own church". The founding documents specifically prohibited Roman Catholics, which was not unusual for that era. Several denominations used the church until 1910, when Methodist circuit preachers became the main users. The church was also used as a school during the week, primarily from 1864 through 1871. The church was closed in 1979.

It was listed on the National Register of Historic Places in 1983.
