= Kern's Fort =

Historic house in West Virginia, United States

- U.S. National Register of Historic Places
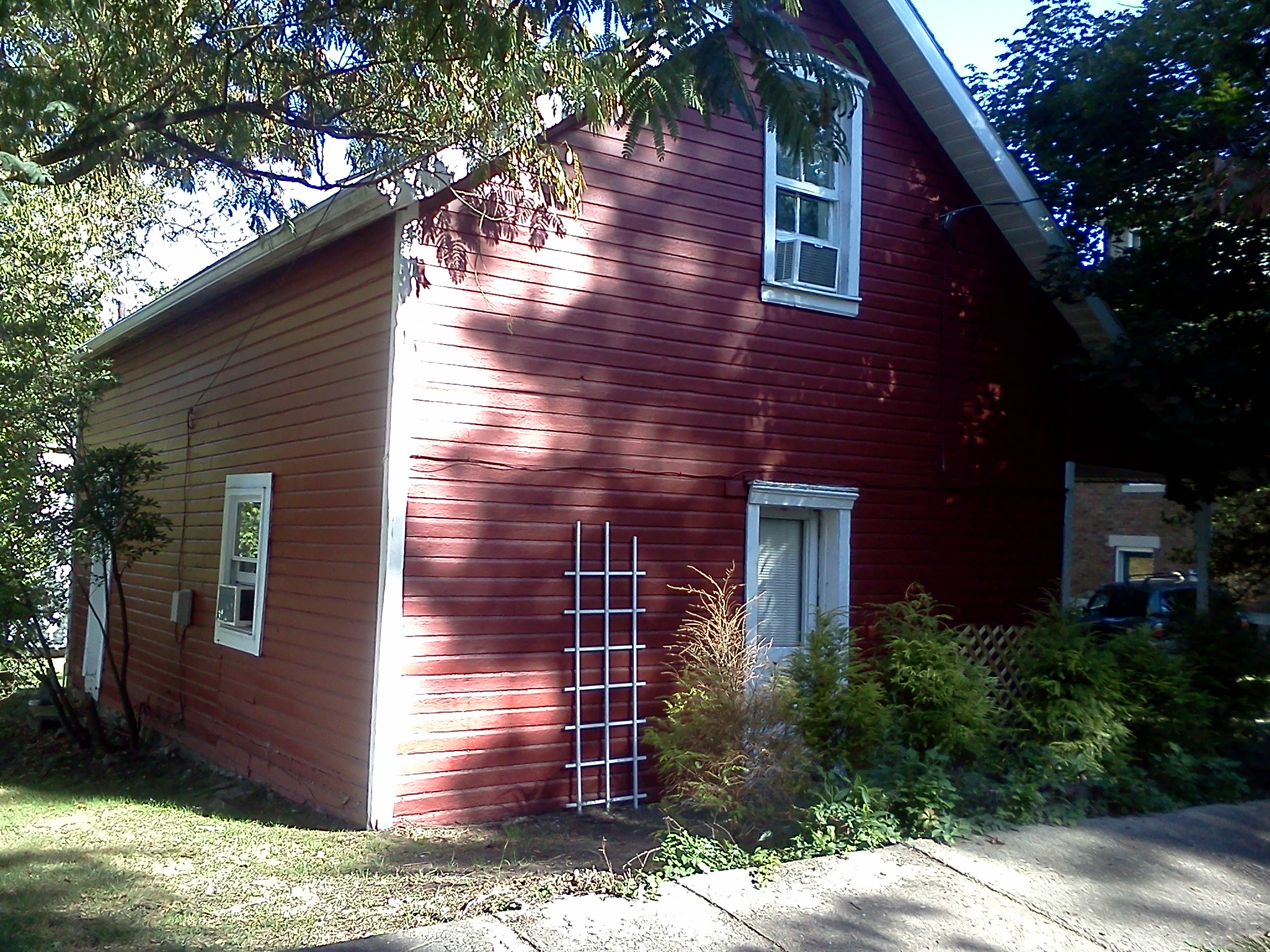

- Location within West Virginia Location within the United States
- Location: 305 Dewey St., Morgantown, West Virginia
- Coordinates: 39°37′31″N 79°56′59″W
- Area: less than one acre
- Built: 1772
- Architect: Michael Kerns
- Architectural style: Colonial, Log House
- NRHP reference No.: 93000225
- Added to NRHP: April 9, 1993

Kern's Fort, also known as Michael Kern's Cabin, is a historic home located at Morgantown, Monongalia County, West Virginia. It is a one-story log house built in 1772. It is built of chestnut logs and covered with wood clapboards. Attached to the rear is a 19th-century frame addition. It was built by Michael Kern, perhaps, the first permanent settler of what is now Morgantown. When Lord Dunmore's War started in 1774, Kern built a stockaded fort around his cabin.

It was listed on the National Register of Historic Places in 1993. It is located in the Greenmont Historic District, listed in 2005.
