= Waitman T. Willey House =

Historic house in West Virginia, United States

- U.S. National Register of Historic Places
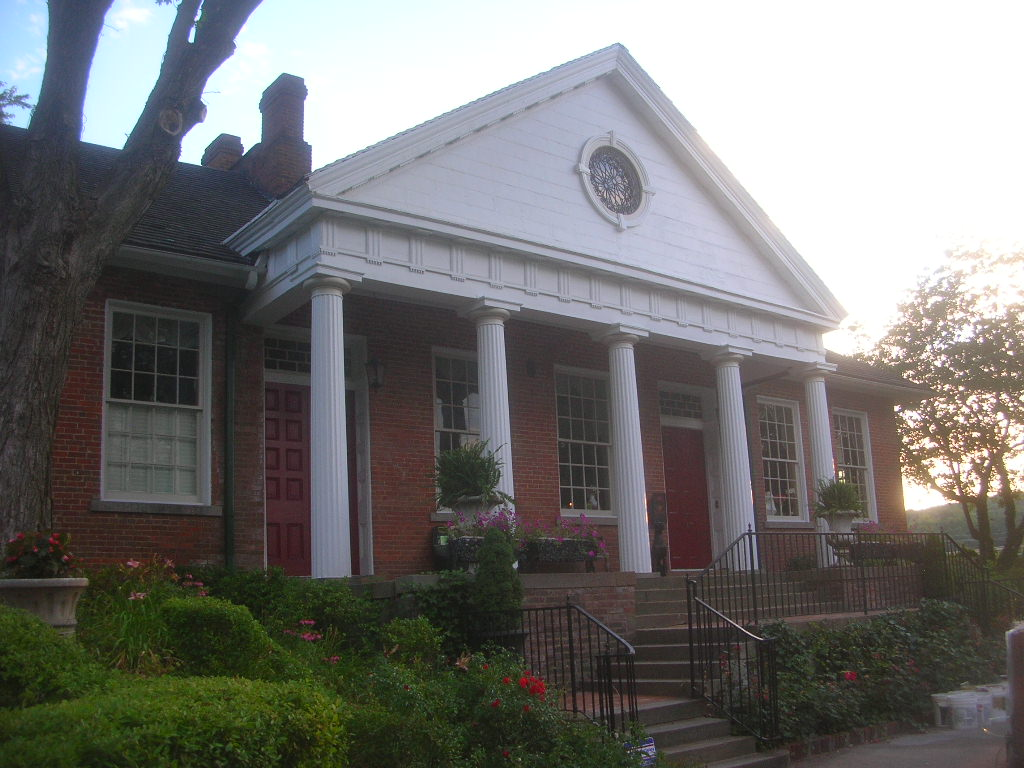
- Waitman T. Willey House, June 2012

- Location within West Virginia Location within the United States
- Location: 128 Wagner Rd., Morgantown, West Virginia
- Coordinates: 39°37′30″N 79°57′34″W
- Area: less than one acre
- Built: 1839-1840
- Architectural style: Classical Revival
- NRHP reference No.: 82004327
- Added to NRHP: April 15, 1982

Waitman T. Willey House is a historic home located at Morgantown, Monongalia County, West Virginia. It was built in 1839–1840, and is a 1 1/2-story, L-shaped brick residence in the Classical Revival style. The front facade features a one-story pentastyle portico with five fluted wood Doric order columns and a high pitched triangular pediment. It was built for Waitman T. Willey (1811-1900), noted lawyer, orator, and statesman.

It was listed on the National Register of Historic Places in 1982.
