= Hackney House =

Historic house in West Virginia, United States

- U.S. National Register of Historic Places
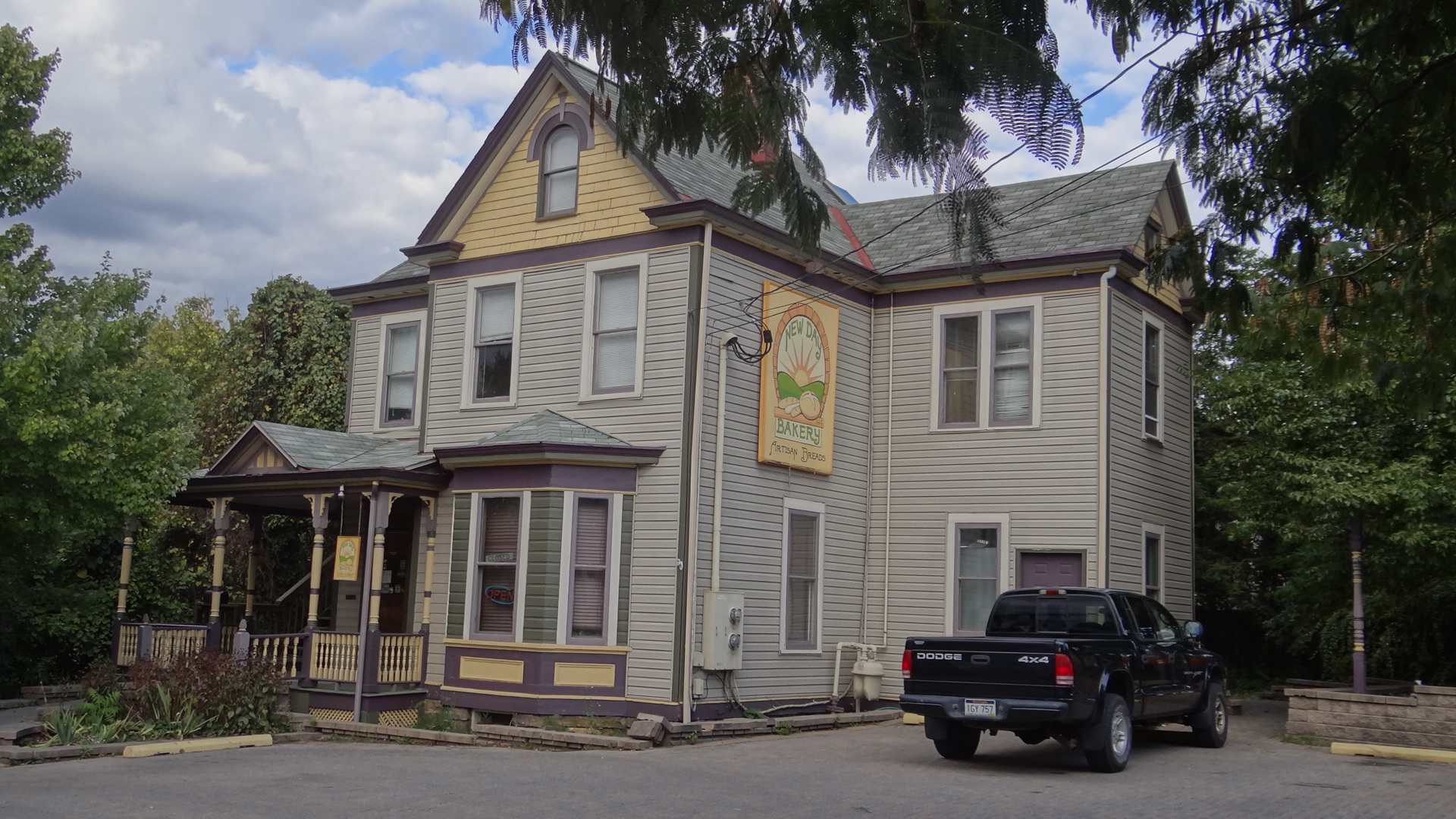

- Location within West Virginia Location within the United States
- Location: 89 Kingwood St., Morgantown, West Virginia
- Coordinates: 39°37′39″N 79°57′8″W
- Area: less than one acre
- Built: 1892
- Built by: Samuel B. Hackney
- Architectural style: Queen Anne
- NRHP reference No.: 99000789
- Added to NRHP: July 1, 1999

Hackney House, also known as Hackney Place, is a historic home located at Morgantown, Monongalia County, West Virginia. The original section was built in 1892, and is a square, 2 1/2-story balloon frame structure with a Queen Anne style entrance porch. A two-story, square addition was added shortly after the original construction. It sits on a cut sandstone foundation.

It was listed on the National Register of Historic Places in 1999. It is located in the Greenmont Historic District, listed in 2005.

The historic house is currently a local bakery.
