= Morgantown Wharf and Warehouse Historic District =

Historic district in West Virginia, United States

- U.S. National Register of Historic Places
- U.S. Historic district
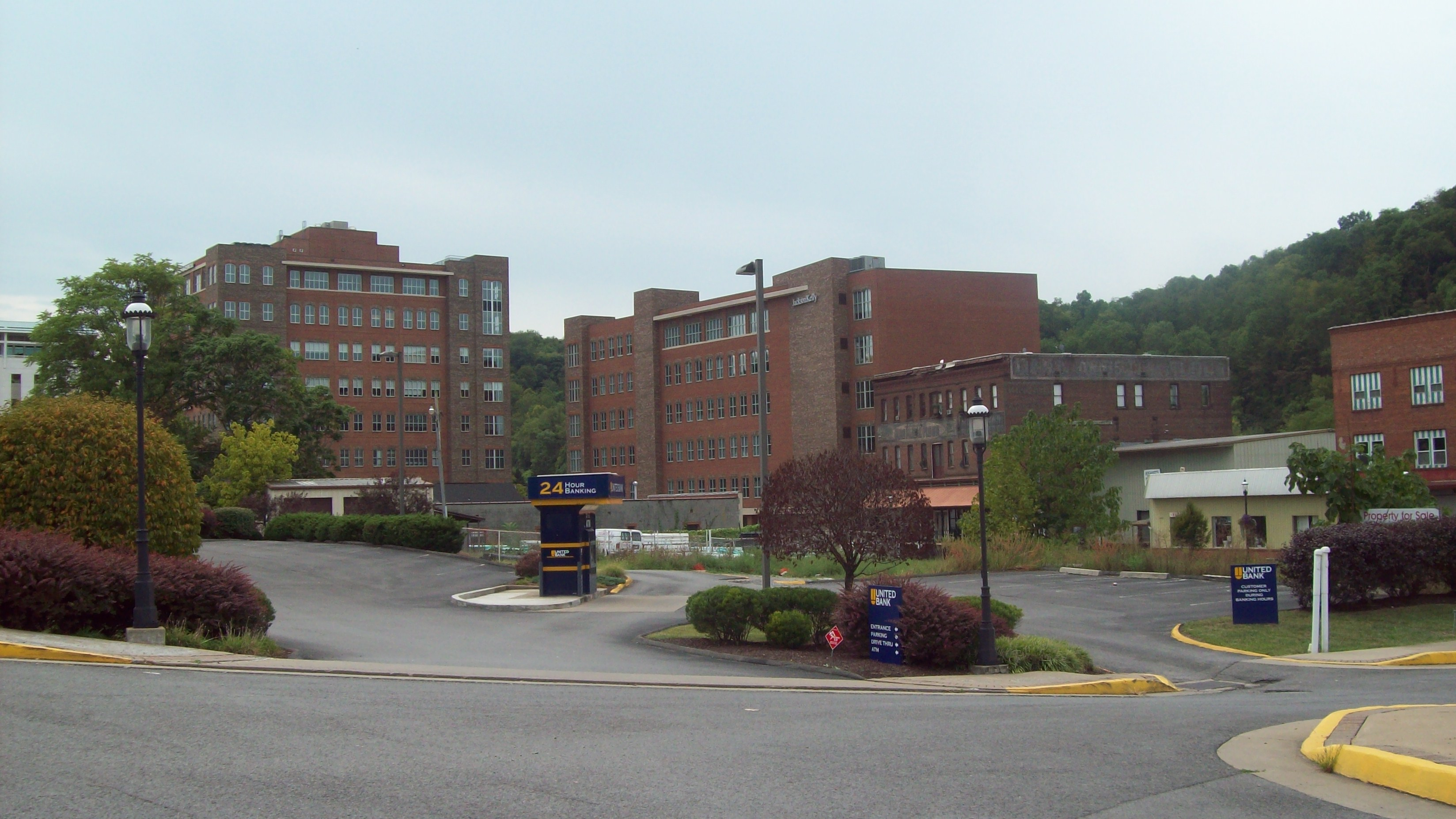

- Location within West Virginia Location within the United States
- Location: Roughly along Monongahela R. from Warren St. to Walnut St., Morgantown, West Virginia
- Coordinates: 39°37′42″N 79°57′39″W
- Area: 20 acres (8.1 ha)
- Built: 1885
- Architectural style: Italianate, Queen Anne, Romanesque
- NRHP reference No.: 98001466
- Added to NRHP: December 16, 1998

Morgantown Wharf and Warehouse Historic District is a national historic district located at Morgantown, Monongalia County, West Virginia.

== Description ==
The district includes 36 contributing buildings, 1 contributing site, and 2 contributing structures in a formerly industrial area along the Monongahela River and B&O Railroad tracks. The district consists of primarily two and three-story, masonry buildings with warehouse or commercial facilities on the first floor with some residential on the upper stories, and some worker's housing. Most of the buildings were built between 1885 and 1948. Notable buildings include the B&O Railroad Depot (1885), Kincaid Building (c. 1904–1906), railroad bridge over Deckers Creek (c. 1900–1910), railroad trestle (c. 1900), and wharf site (c. 1847). Also located in the district is the separately listed Kincaid and Arnett Feed and Flour Building.

It was listed on the National Register of Historic Places in 1998.
