= Easton Roller Mill =

- U.S. National Register of Historic Places
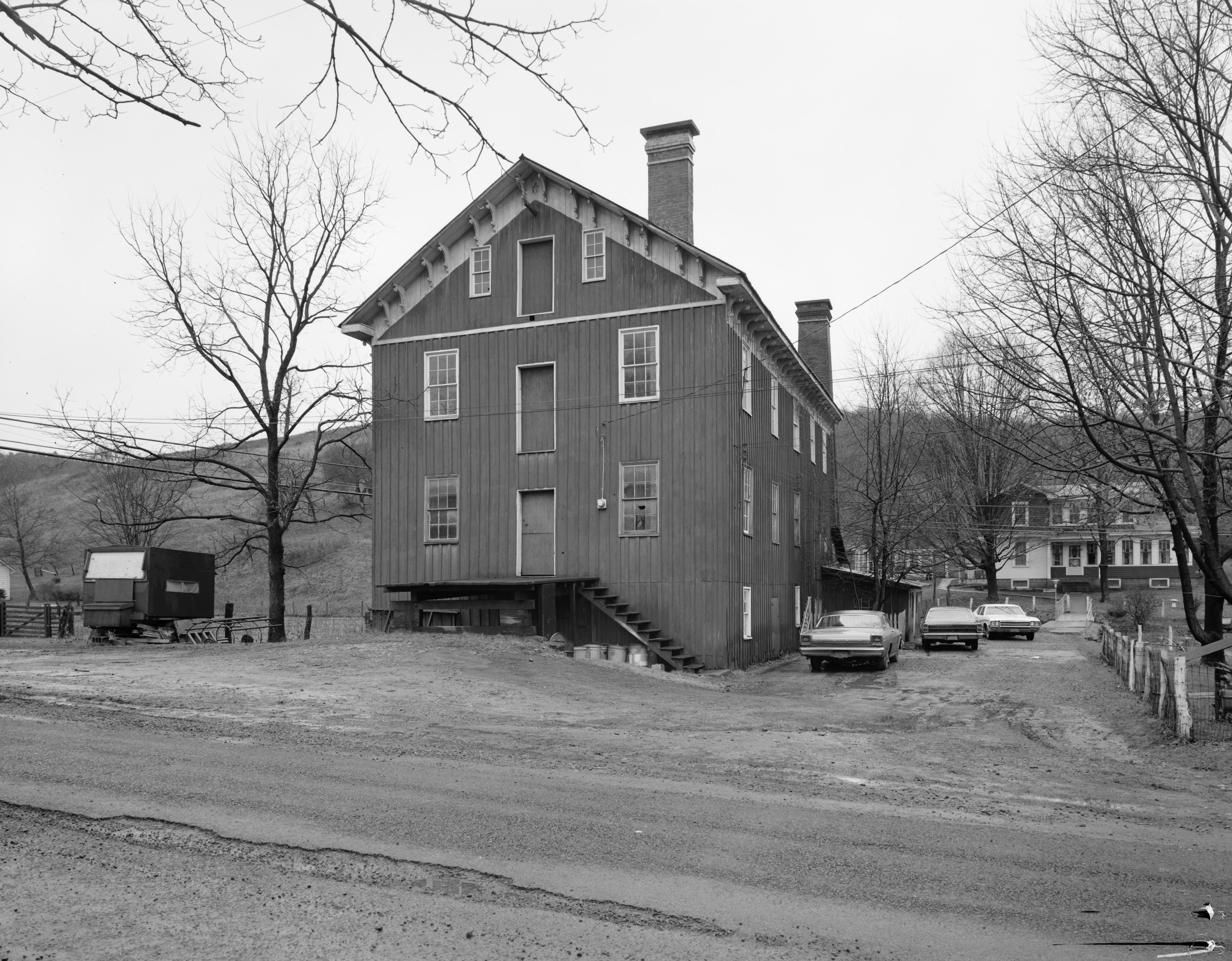
- Easton Roller Mill, 1974

- Location within West Virginia Location within the United States
- Location: Near Easton Hill on County Route 119/17, near Morgantown, West Virginia
- Coordinates: 39°39′0″N 79°54′45″W
- Area: 0.5 acres (0.20 ha)
- Built: 1894
- NRHP reference No.: 78002806
- Added to NRHP: December 19, 1978

Easton Roller Mill is a historic sawmill and grist mill located near Morgantown, Monongalia County, West Virginia. Construction began in 1864 and was completed in 1867. During the first 10 or so years, the mill changed hands from the original builder, Henry Koontz of Frostburg MD, about four times before mill-modernizer Isaac Morris bought the mill in 1894. Originally it was a 3 1/2-story rectangular, timber frame building with a shed addition; however, the shed was removed In recent years. Most mills of this era were exclusively using Burr stones for milling and grinding, however in 1894, the owner, Isaac Morris, installed roller mills for the production of high-grade white flour coming into popular demand. At that time, the Burr stone mill was relegated to grinding cornmeal, and so began a second business of cornmeal and animal feed products also sold at the Easton mill. It is probable Mr. Morris also installed the current steam engine, an 1875 Lane & Bodley 40 HP single expansion engine. The engine once ran on coal-generated steam; however, for insurance reasons, it now runs on compressed air for demonstration purposes. The mill ran under Mr. Morris' ownership until 1910. William C. Ley (pronounced lie) bought the mill in 1910 and ran it 24 hours a day until 1930. We are told that Mr. Ley was of German descent, was tall, spoke with a heavy accent, and often wore a thick black mustache under his wide brimmed hat. He was known for running a very expertly tuned operation, and keeping his equipment in perfect working order. We believe Mr. Ley potentially ran the mill seasonally through the 1930s, until his death in 1941. Between 1939 and Ley's death in 1941, Ley's daughter Estella Ley-Pickenpaugh and her husband Fred Pickenpaugh attempted to restore the mill to full working order, only to discover local wheat and grains unavailable, as most milling had moved to large-scale mills in the Midwest. During this time they may have been assisted by Mr. Ley's milling partner Frank A. Walls of Easton. It is unclear whether Walls held ownership interest in the mill at any time; however, his name appears on the cornmeal bags only. The mill was willed by Estella Ley-Pickenpaugh to the Monongalia Historical Society in 1978. In the fall-winter of 2012–2013, restoration work began at the mill.

It was listed on the National Register of Historic Places in 1978.
