= Waitman T. Willey =

American lawyer and politician

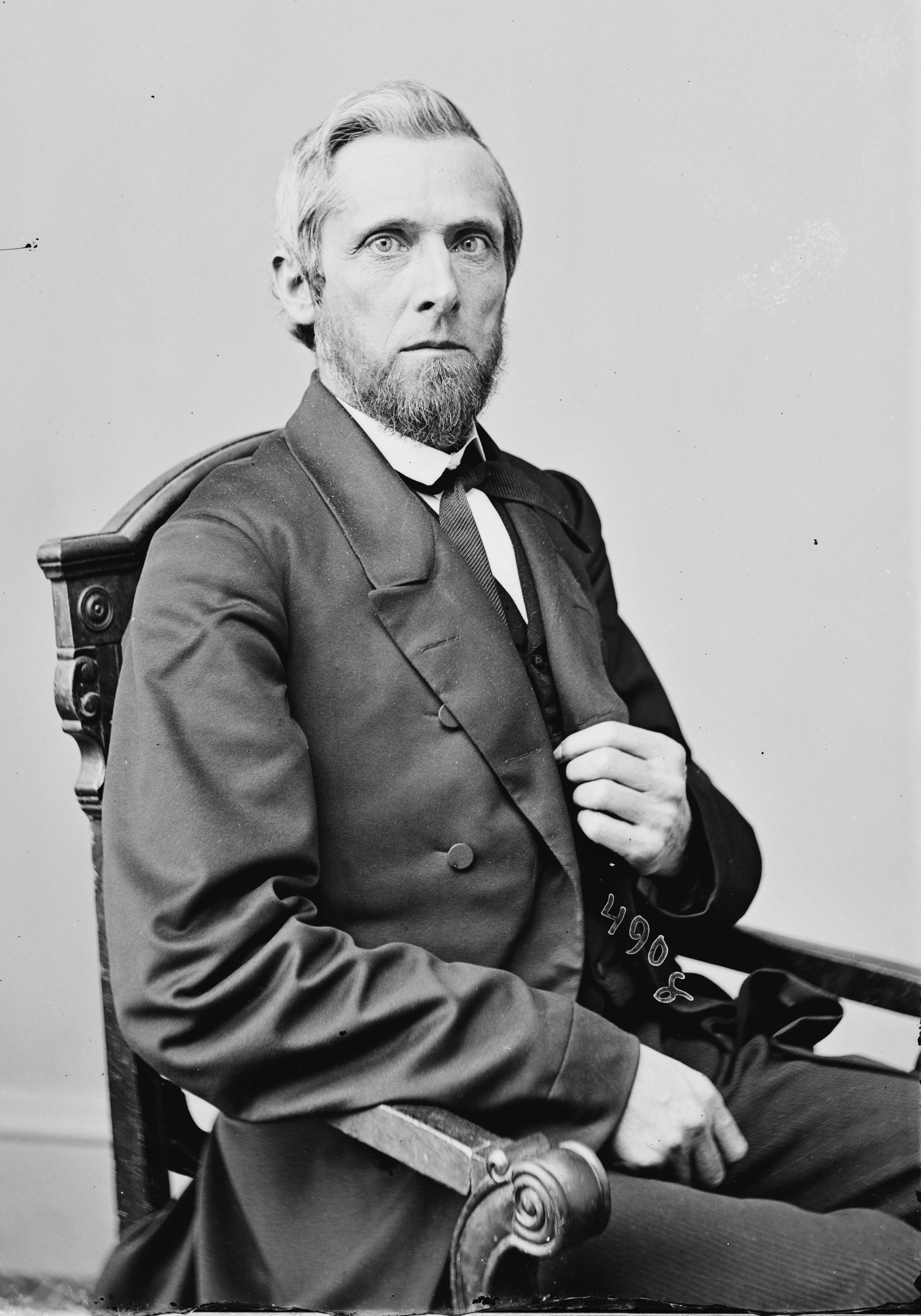

United States Senator
- In office August 4, 1863 – March 3, 1871
- Preceded by: Office established
- Succeeded by: Henry G. Davis
- Constituency: West Virginia
- In office July 9, 1861 – March 3, 1863
- Preceded by: James M. Mason
- Succeeded by: Lemuel J. Bowden
- Constituency: Virginia

Personal details
- Born: October 18, 1811 Farmington, Virginia (now Farmington, West Virginia), U.S.
- Died: May 2, 1900 (aged 88) Morgantown, West Virginia, U.S.
- Party: Whig (1840-1860); Union (1861-1865); Republican (1865-1900)
- Spouse: Elizabeth Ray Willey

Waitman Thomas Willey (October 18, 1811 – May 2, 1900) was an American lawyer and politician from Morgantown, West Virginia. One of the founders of the state of West Virginia during the American Civil War, he served in the United States Senate representing first the Restored Government of Virginia and became one of the new state of West Virginia's first two senators. He is one of only two people in U.S. history to represent more than one state in the U.S. Senate, the other being James Shields (who represented Illinois, Minnesota, and Missouri).

== Early and family life ==
Willey was born in 1811, in a log cabin near Buffalo Creek and the present day Farmington, West Virginia, in Marion County. He was raised on Paw Paw Creek in Monongalia County. He could only attend school for about two months because his family needed him to work on the farm, but he was determined to get an education. On Christmas Day 1827, the 17 year old with his belongings wrapped in a handkerchief, began walking from his home to Madison College (later Allegheny College) in Uniontown, Pennsylvania. He worked hard, and even tutored other students, graduating six months ahead of schedule in June 1831.

Having gained many friends who were ministers or other church folk, Willey returned to what was then still Virginia. He moved to Wellsburg to read law under the guidance of western Virginia sectional leader Philip Doddridge. He later received honorary degrees from Alleghany College, Augusta College and West Virginia University.

In 1834, Willey married Elizabeth Ray, with whom he had six children before her death a few years before his: Mary E. Casselberry (d. 1862); Sarah B. Hagans, William P. Willey, Julia E. McGrew, Thomas R. Willey, Louisa A. Willey and John B. Willey.

== Career ==
Admitted to the Virginia bar in September 1832, Willey moved to Morgantown to establish a private legal practice.

He became active in politics, especially in the Whig Party, and in 1840 was an elector for the William Henry Harrison/John Tyler ticket, although he also lost election to become a delegate to the Virginia General Assembly. In 1841, voters elected Willey Clerk of the County Court of Monongalia County, and re-elected him several times; Willey served until 1852. He was active in local politics, served in a variety of positions, and was a popular speaker for the literacy society and temperance campaigns.

As one of four delegates representing Marion, Preston, Monongalia and Taylor Counties at the Virginia Constitutional Convention of 1850, Willey argued in favor of universal suffrage for white men, and also believed that eastern Virginian elites dominated political power in the state. His speech "Liberty and Union" brought him broader attention. In 1852, Willey became the Whig candidate for Congress, but lost.

In 1859 Willey became the Whig delegate for Lieutenant Governor of Virginia, but lost. The following year he campaigned for Everett and Bell of the Constitutional Union Party in the 1860 Presidential election. His candidates lost badly, and Republican Abraham Lincoln was elected president.

== American Civil War and West Virginia statehood ==
Elected a member of the Virginia Secession Convention in 1861 (representing Monongalia County, alongside J.M. Heck and Marshall M. Dent), Willey warned fellow delegates about the ravages of civil war. Although Willey voted against secession several times during the convention, the ordinance of secession eventually passed and Virginia seceded on April 17, 1861.

Although conservative (and a slaveowner), Willey actively participated at the First Wheeling Convention of May, 1861, which ultimately led to West Virginia statehood (although Willey had been among those who blocked John S. Carlile's proposal for immediate statehood). He did not seek election to the June Second Wheeling Convention, which established the Restored Government of Virginia, although he would soon be elected one of the new state's first two U.S. Senators (alongside Carlile).

In April 1863, Willey was one of the targets of the Confederate Jones-Imboden raid to destroy the Baltimore and Ohio Railroad tracks and capture the Restored Government of Virginia at Wheeling. However, when Jones' troops moved into Kingwood and Morgantown, their attempt to destroy a suspension bridge over the Monongahela River failed and Willey escaped in a fast buggy into Pennsylvania, although the raiders continued to Fairmont and destroyed the library of Gov. Francis Pierpont.

The Restored Government of Virginia elected him to the U.S. Senate to fill the vacancy of Senator James M. Mason, who had joined the Confederate cause. Willey (a Republican) became one of the first two U.S. Senators from West Virginia (1863–1871) (alongside Peter G. Van Winkle). On May 29, 1862, Willey presented the petition to Congress for the creation of West Virginia. In part because of a published abolitionist address by Rev. Gordon Battelle, it was accepted only after Willey offered an Amendment acceptable to Radical Republicans, which provided for emancipation of slaves under 21 years of age on July 4, 1863, upon their reaching 21 years of age. Previously, Willey (who had domestic slaves) had argued for compensated emancipation. That compromise secured adoption of the West Virginia statehood bill.

Because of his federal position (although he drew the short term of 2 years), Willey participated only from the sidelines in West Virginia's Constitutional Convention at Wheeling. However, he did vote to remove President Andrew Johnson from the Presidency, although that impeachment failed by one vote (and his fellow Senator Van Winkle voted the other way).

After Willey won and served one full term, he retired from Congress in 1871, and became a delegate to the West Virginia Constitutional Convention of 1872. However, his political career ended as Democrats regained political power in the new state.

In 1872, Willey also was elected to General Conference of the Methodist Church, but declined to serve. He did serve as a delegate-at-large to the National Republican Convention in 1876, and to the Methodist General Conference of 1880. In 1882, he accepted a temporary appointment as Clerk of the County Court in Monongelia County after the incumbent died, and voters elected him to a full six-year term in 1884.

== Death and legacy ==
Willey died on May 2, 1900, at 88 years of age, after the deaths of his wife and one of his daughters. He was buried at Oak Grove Cemetery in Morgantown. His son William became a professor at West Virginia University in Morgantown, and during his lifetime, Willey had tutored many men who became judges and leading members of the West Virginia bar.

Although the Waitman T. Willey House that he built in 1839-1840 had been in a semi-rural setting, 78 lots were divided around it after his death, and the surrounding area became the Chancery Hill Addition within the industrializing city. The house still exists; it was listed on the National Register of Historic Places in 1982, and renovated in 2012.

== See also ==
- List of members of the United States Congress from multiple states

== Bibliography ==
- "How Virginia Convention delegates voted on secession, April 4 and April 17…" (PDF). Union or Secession. Library of Virginia.

U.S. Senate
Preceded by James M. Mason	U.S. senator (Class 1) from Virginia; July 9, 1861 – March 3, 1863; Served alongside: John S. Carlile	Succeeded by Lemuel J. Bowden
Preceded by None	U.S. senator (Class 2) from West Virginia; August 4, 1863 – March 3, 1871; Served alongside: Peter G. Van Winkle and Arthur I. Boreman	Succeeded by Henry G. Davis
