= Oglebay Hall =

- U.S. National Register of Historic Places
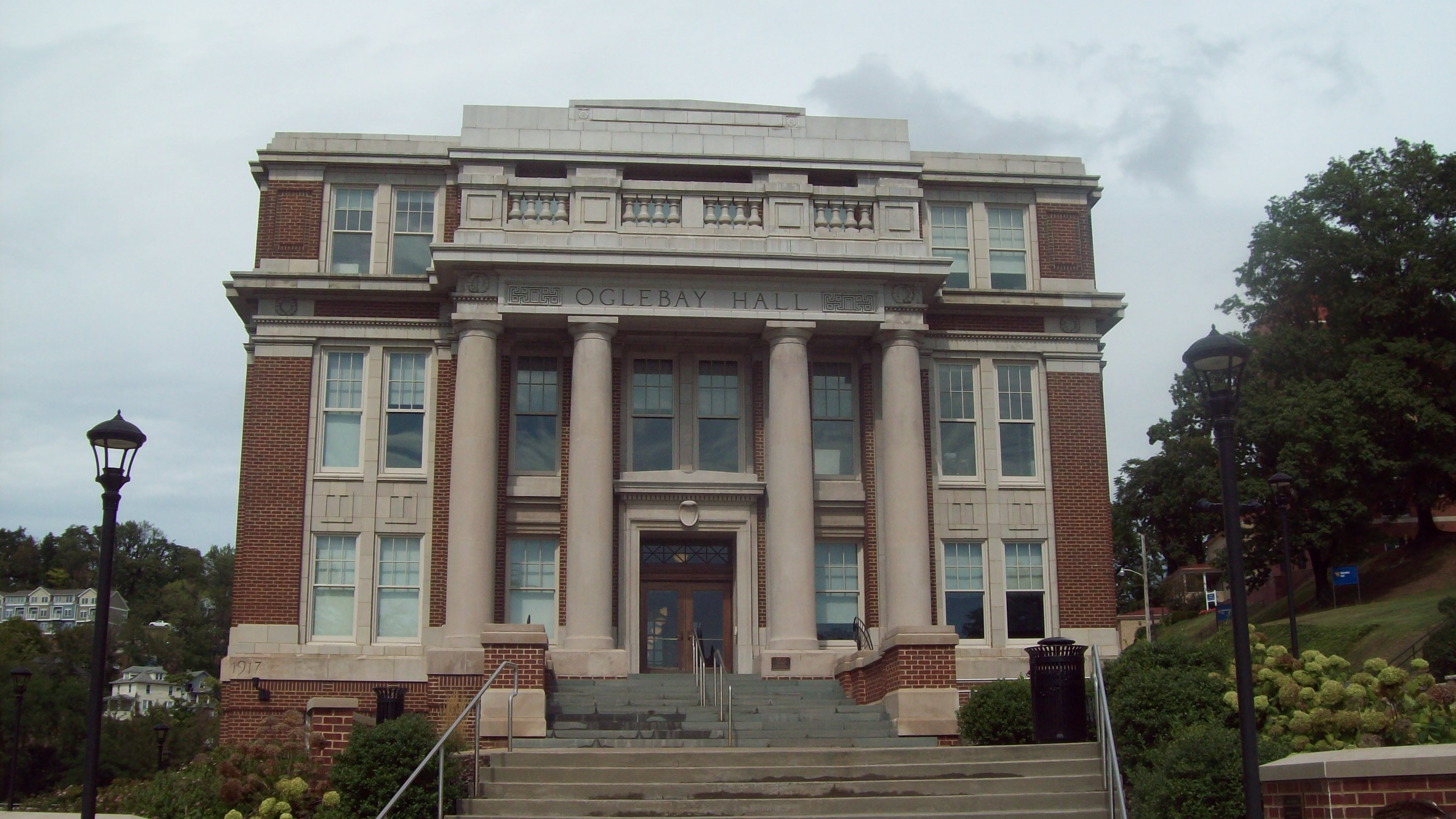
- Oglebay Hall, September 2012

- Location within West Virginia Location within the United States
- Location: University Ave., Morgantown, West Virginia
- Coordinates: 39°38′14″N 79°57′16″W
- Area: 1.5 acres (0.61 ha)
- Built: 1918
- Architectural style: Classical Revival
- MPS: West Virginia University Neo-Classical Revival Buildings TR
- NRHP reference No.: 85003207
- Added to NRHP: December 19, 1985

Oglebay Hall is a historic classroom building associated with the West Virginia University and located at Morgantown, Monongalia County, West Virginia. It was built in 1918, and is a three-story, brick and concrete building with Classical Revival detailing. The front facade features four Doric order columns that support a pediment with a false, concrete railing and entablature with the building's name. It also has balconies with cast iron balustrades. It originally housed the university's College of Agriculture (until 1961) and represents the university's heritage as a land-grant institution. The building is named for industrialist and philanthropist Earl W. Oglebay, whose house at Wheeling, West Virginia is known as the Oglebay Mansion Museum.

It was listed on the National Register of Historic Places in 1985.

Following a $20 million remodeling project completed in 2008, Oglebay Hall the home of WVU's Department of Forensic and Investigative Science, and connects to Ming Hsieh Hall, hosting additional lecture room space.
