= Kincaid and Arnett Feed and Flour Building =

- U.S. National Register of Historic Places
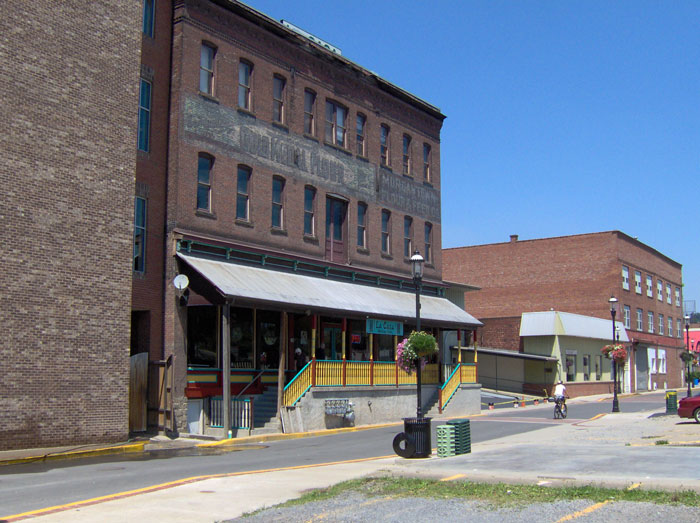
- Kincaid and Arnett Feed and Flour Building, December 2006

- Location within West Virginia Location within the United States
- Location: 156 Clay St., Morgantown, West Virginia
- Coordinates: 39°37′31″N 79°57′50″W
- Area: less than one acre
- NRHP reference No.: 95000873
- Added to NRHP: July 21, 1995

Kincaid and Arnett Feed and Flour Building is a historic warehouse building located at Morgantown, Monongalia County, West Virginia. It was built between 1904 and 1906, and is a three-story, vernacular brick warehouse located along the banks of the Monongahela River. It is trapezoid shaped and has a prominent concrete-block loading dock with overhead canopy. Kincaid and Arnett functioned as a prosperous wholesale and retail grain dealership and brokerage until they sold the property to Morgantown Feed and Flour Corporation in February 1921.

It was listed on the National Register of Historic Places in 1995. It is located in the Morgantown Wharf and Warehouse Historic District, listed in 1998.
