= Vance Farmhouse =

Historic house in West Virginia, United States

- U.S. National Register of Historic Places
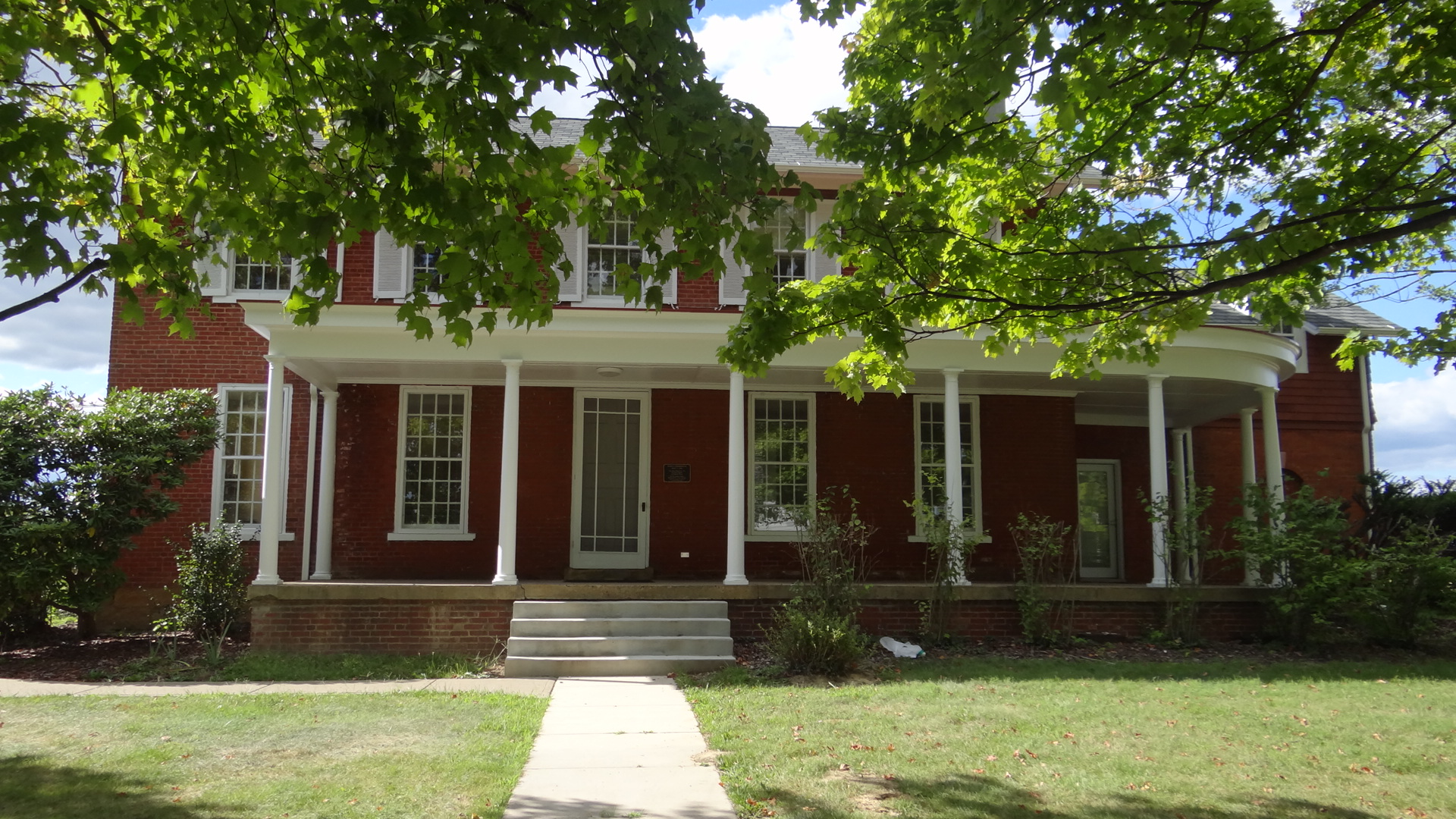

- Location within West Virginia Location within the United States
- Location: 1535 Mileground, Morgantown, West Virginia
- Coordinates: 39°38′23″N 79°56′13″W
- Area: 0.4 acres (0.16 ha)
- Built: c. 1854
- Architectural style: Vernacular I-house
- NRHP reference No.: 91001731
- Added to NRHP: November 21, 1991

Vance Farmhouse, also known as Meeks Farmhouse, Dean's House, and Bicentennial House, is a historic home located on a West Virginia University farm at Morgantown, Monongalia County, West Virginia. The original section was built about 1854, and is a two-story, I-house form brick dwelling. The 1 1/2-story rear addition was built before 1900, and the two-story side addition on the northeast elevation was added in the 1930s. It features a wrap-around porch added sometime before 1900. The property was acquired for the West Virginia University Experiment Station in 1899. It housed the dean of the College of Agriculture from 1915 to 1957. During the United States Bicentennial in 1976, it was used as a showcase for exhibits on Monongalia County history. It has housed the West Virginia University Institute for the History of Technology and Industrial Archeology and is currently home to West Virginia University Press.

It was listed on the National Register of Historic Places in 1991.
