= Chancery Hill Historic District =

Historic district in West Virginia, United States

- U.S. National Register of Historic Places
- U.S. Historic district
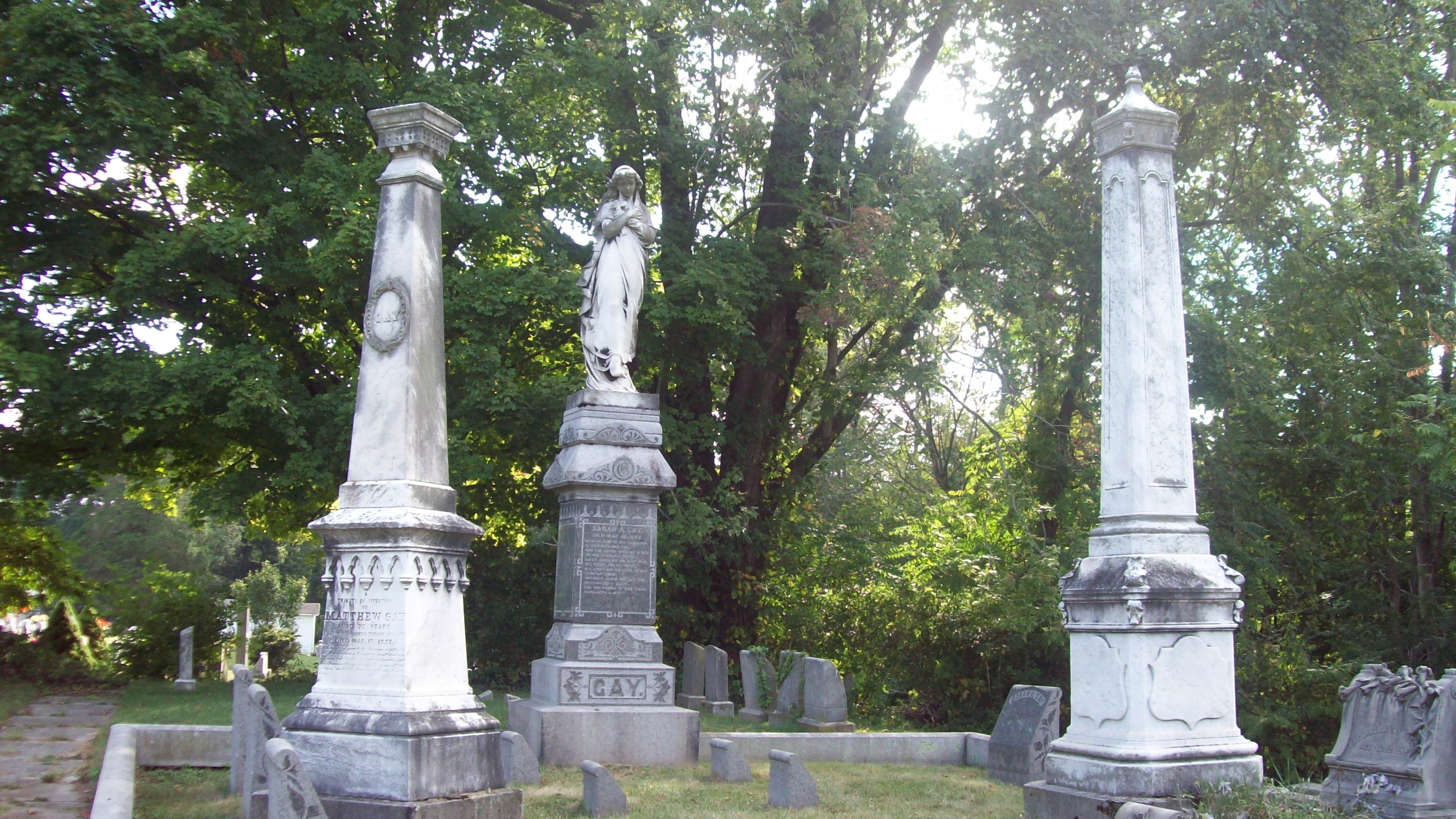
- Oak Grove Cemetery

- Location within West Virginia Location within the United States
- Location: Roughly bounded by S. High St., Oak Grove Cemetery, Waitman, Allison and Simpson Sts., and 256 Prairie Ave., Morgantown, West Virginia
- Coordinates: 39°37′20″N 79°57′43″W
- Area: 34.3 acres (13.9 ha)
- NRHP reference No.: 99001401, 01001405
- Added to NRHP: December 3, 1999, boundary increase November 29, 2001

Chancery Hill Historic District is a national historic district located at Morgantown, Monongalia County, West Virginia. The district originally included 109 contributing buildings and 1 contributing site, Oak Grove Cemetery. A boundary increase in 2001, added the already listed Alexander Wade House to the district. The district encompasses a residential area developed in the early-20th century on property that was once the farm of U.S. Senator Waitman T. Willey. It includes examples of popular architectural styles from that period including Queen Anne, American Foursquare, Colonial Revival, and Bungalow.

It was listed on the National Register of Historic Places in 1999, with a boundary increase in 2001.

== Oak Grove Cemetery ==
Notable burials include:

- William E. Glasscock, 13th Governor of West Virginia
- John Hagans, member of the United States House of Representatives from 1873 to 1875
- George Cookman Sturgiss, member of the United States House of Representatives from 1907 to 1911
- Waitman T. Willey, member of the Wheeling Convention, Senator for Virginia and West Virginia
- Edgar C. Wilson, member of the United States House of Representatives from 1833 to 1835 for Virginia
- Thomas Wilson, member of the United States House of Representatives from 1811 to 1813 for Virginia
