= Greenmont Historic District =

Historic district in West Virginia, United States

- U.S. National Register of Historic Places
- U.S. Historic district
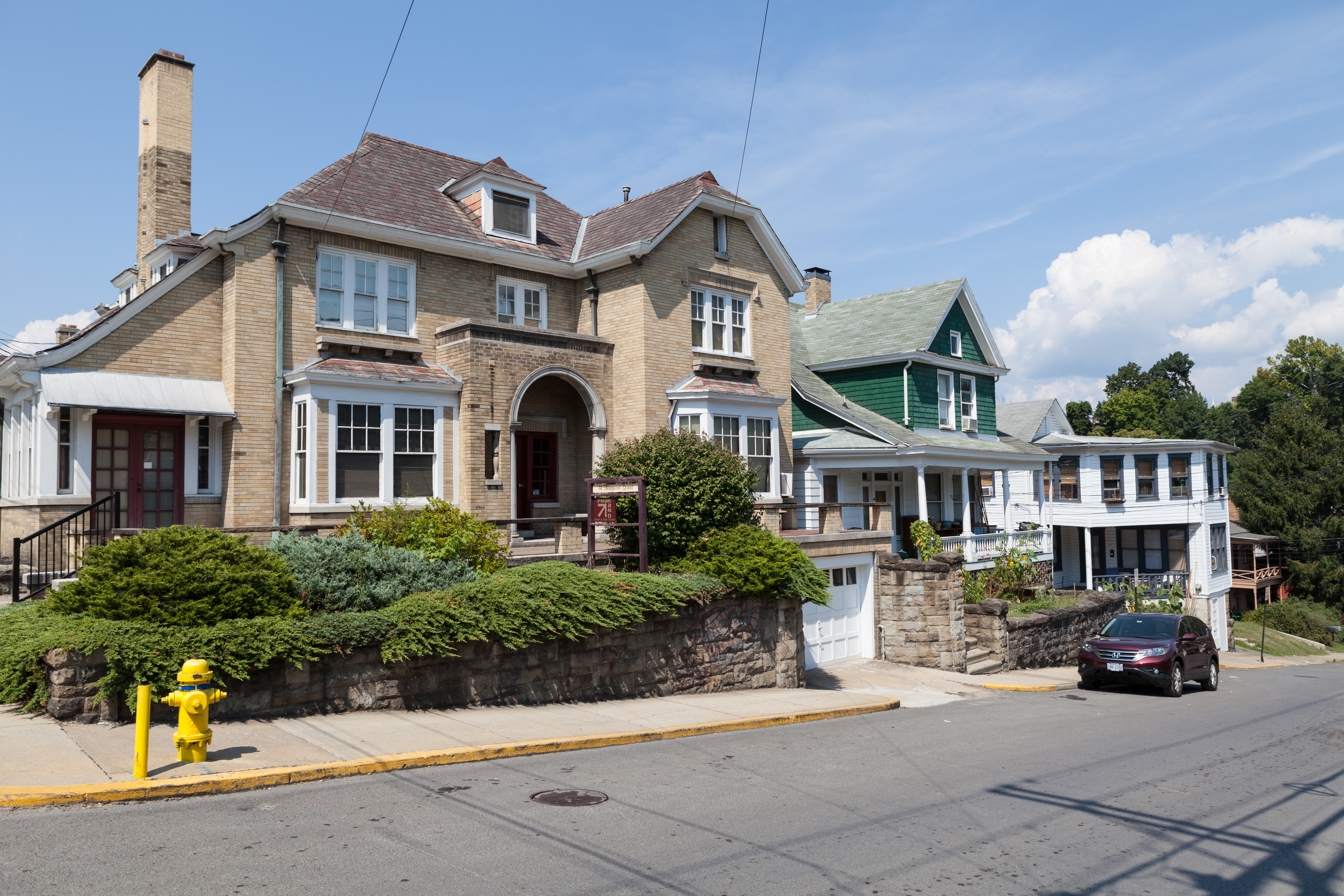
- At 74 Kingwood Street, looking east

- Location within West Virginia Location within the United States
- Location: Roughly bounded by Arlington, Front, Conn, White Ave., Posten Ave., Kingwood St., and Decker Ave., Morgantown, West Virginia
- Coordinates: 39°37′31″N 79°57′0″W
- Area: 74.9 acres (30.3 ha)
- Built: 1774
- Architectural style: Colonial, Mid 19th Century Revival
- NRHP reference No.: 04001597
- Added to NRHP: February 2, 2005

Greenmont Historic District is a national historic district located at Morgantown, Monongalia County, West Virginia. The district includes 409 contributing buildings, 4 contributing structures, and 2 contributing objects in a primarily residential area of the Greenmount neighborhood of Morgantown. Most of the dwellings were built between 1901 and 1925 and are of frame construction with brick or wood facades, one- to 2 1/2 stories high with gable fronts. Notable buildings include the Reformation Orthodox Presbyterian Church. Also in the district are the separately listed Kern's Fort, and Hackney House.

It was listed on the National Register of Historic Places in 2005.
