= Harmony Grove, West Virginia =

Harmony Grove
- Unincorporated community
- Location within the state of West Virginia Harmony Grove (the United States)
- Coordinates: 39°36′25″N 79°59′24″W
- Country: United States
- State: West Virginia
- County: Monongalia
- Elevation: 1,306 ft (398 m)
- Time zone: UTC-5 (Eastern (EST))
  - Summer (DST): UTC-4 (EDT)
- GNIS ID: 1554652

Harmony Grove is an unincorporated community in Monongalia County, West Virginia, United States.

It is the location of the Harmony Grove Meeting House, listed on the National Register of Historic Places in 1983.
