= Smithtown, West Virginia =

Smithtown
- Unincorporated community
- Location within the state of West Virginia Smithtown (the United States)
- Coordinates: 39°31′46″N 80°2′29″W
- Country: United States
- State: West Virginia
- County: Monongalia
- Elevation: 988 ft (301 m)
- Time zone: UTC-5 (Eastern (EST))
  - Summer (DST): UTC-4 (EDT)
- GNIS ID: 1555649

Smithtown is an unincorporated community in Monongalia County, West Virginia, United States.

The community was named after Richard Smith, the original owner of the town site.
