= Downtown Morgantown Historic District =

Historic district in West Virginia, United States

- U.S. National Register of Historic Places
- U.S. Historic district
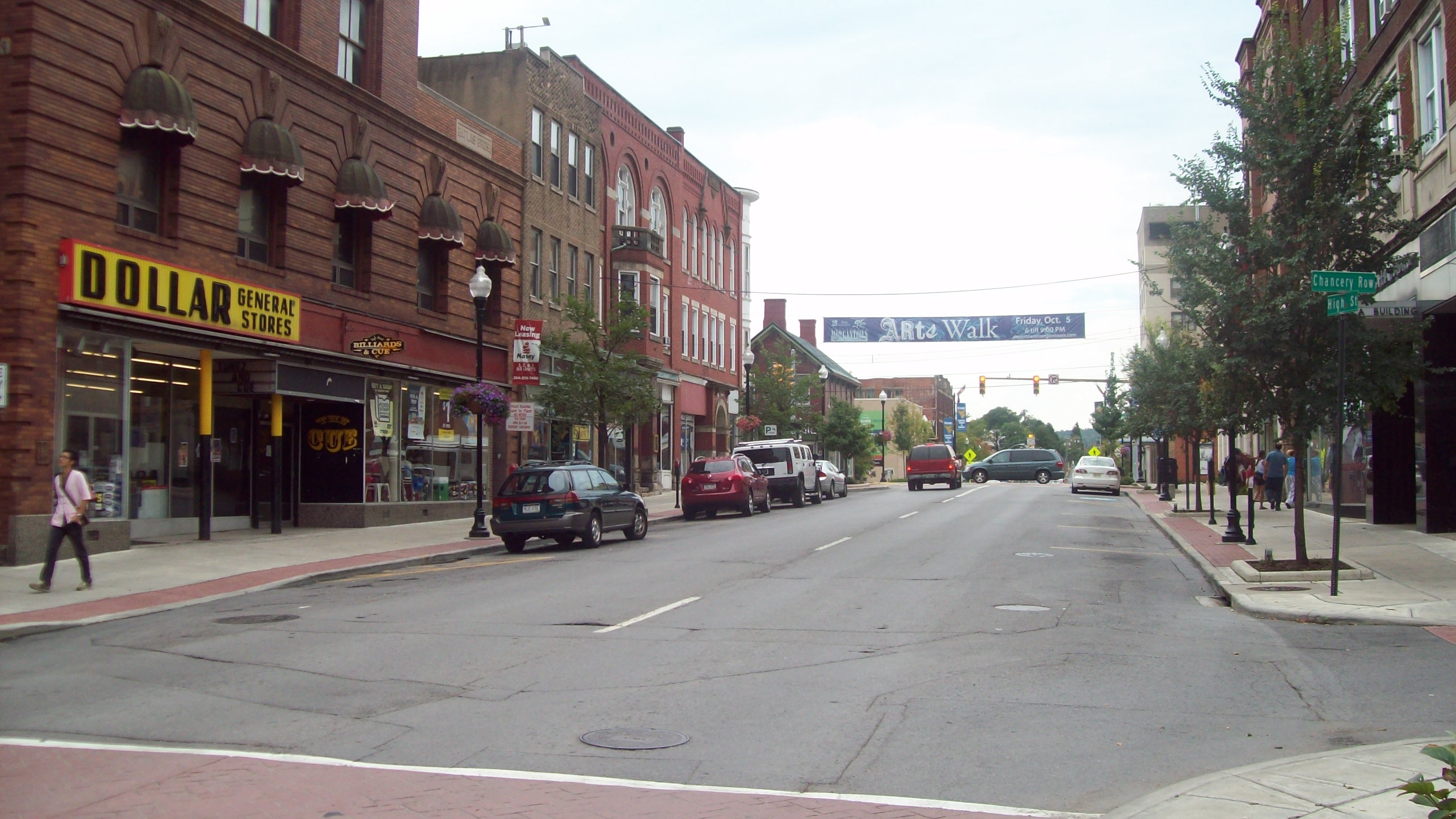
- Downtown Morgantown, September 2012

- Location within West Virginia Location within the United States
- Location: Roughly bounded by Chestnut and Spruce Sts. between Foundry and Willey Sts., Morgantown, West Virginia
- Coordinates: 39°37′47″N 79°57′26″W
- Area: 75 acres (30 ha)
- Architect: Jacobs, Elmer; et al.
- Architectural style: Italianate, Greek Revival, Federal
- NRHP reference No.: 96000441
- Added to NRHP: May 2, 1996

The Downtown Morgantown Historic District is a federally designated historic district in Morgantown, Monongalia County, West Virginia. The district, encompassing approximately 75 acres, has 122 contributing buildings and 2 contributing sites including commercial and public buildings, residences, and churches. The district has been listed on the National Register of Historic Places since May 2, 1996. Ten of the contributing buildings are listed separately on the National Register of Historic Places. Significant structures located within the historic district are the Monongalia County Courthouse, the Metropolitan Theater, and the Old Morgantown Post Office (currently the Monongalia Arts Center).

== History ==
The historic district is representative of significant developments in architecture, social history, and industry that occurred in Morgantown and the surrounding region between 1795 and 1945. Morgantown is located along the Monongahela River which flows north to Pittsburgh and on to the Ohio and Mississippi Rivers. The town's proximity to the river made it an important location in westward expansion. In the late 1750s, settlers began building small farms in the area. Zackquill Morgan, the town's founder, received a grant in 1784 for 50 acres on land at the junction of Deckers Creek and the river. Morgan had built a settlement on the land in 1772 and returned to the area after serving as a colonel in the Revolutionary War. He laid out a grid for the town on this property and received a charter for “Morgan’s Town” in 1785.

The town grew slowly throughout the early nineteenth century, with development based largely on the exportation of agricultural and industrial products north along the river. During the Civil War, the town was a strong supporter of the Union. Waitman T. Willey, a local lawyer, lived in the town and was a leader in the movement to create the state of West Virginia. The Confederate Jones- Imboden raiders occupied the town briefly during the war in an attempt to capture Willey, but he had fled before their arrival. After the war, the town grew quickly as transportation improved and the oil, petroleum, coal, and timber industries expanded. Many new immigrants came to the town to work in these growing businesses. During this time, the town also became a center of education with the creation of West Virginia University based on earlier academies and seminary schools. With the expansion of these educational and industrial activities came the building of new offices, homes, churches, and many other buildings to support the growing town. The development that occurred in the town over the past two and a half centuries can be seen throughout the historic district.

== Boundaries ==
The boundaries of the historic district are based on the original town grid laid out by the town's founder Zackquill Morgan in 1785. The central portion of the district is High Street, running parallel between Chestnut Street and Spruce Street. The district is bounded on the north by Willey Street which separates the downtown area from the campus of West Virginia University. To the south, the district is bounded by Foundry Street which runs along Decker's Creek. To the west, the district is bounded by Chestnut Street which runs parallel to the Monongahela River. To the east, the district is bounded by Spruce Street which also runs along Decker's Creek with bridges crossing over to the adjacent South Park Historic District.

== Architecture ==
The buildings with the historic district are representative of the architectural styles were common in the region between 1795 and 1945. The earliest structures in the district are in the federal style that was popular in the decades following the Revolutionary War. Buildings from the late nineteenth and early twentieth centuries are in a variety of styles particularly Classic revival, Victorian, Gothic Revival, Italianate, and Romanesque. Many of the buildings within the historic district were designed by Elmer F. Jacobs, a local architect. Jacobs employed many of the styles popular during the Gilded Age to create an eclectic landscape in the downtown area.

== Properties ==
=== Buildings listed separately on the National Register ===
- Brown Building, also known as the Ream Building, was built in 1898. This commercial building was designed by Elmer Jacobs. It is a four-story eclectic style brick building with a flat roof and projecting cornice.
- Dering Building, built in 1896, is a commercial building designed by Elmer Jacobs. It is a three-story Romanesque Revival style stone building. It features a pediment above the flat roof with a rising sun motif and the date of construction inscribed in the center.
- Judge Frank Cox House, built about 1898, is a two and a half story Queen Anne style brick dwelling designed by Elmer Jacobs. The house features a three-story tower, five chimneys with decorative brick detailing, stained glass windows, and a wooden porch and portico. This was the home of Judge Frank Cox, a local lawyer and prosecuting attorney who served on the Supreme Court of Appeals of West Virginia.
- Metropolitan Theatre opened on July 24, 1924. The brick facade features fluted concrete Ionic order pilasters with egg-and-dart detail in the Classical Revival style. The theater continues to provide a home for the city's live entertainment with a single floor auditorium, balcony, two storefronts on the ground floor, and a pool hall in the basement.
- Monongalia County Courthouse, built in 1891, is a two-story Romanesque style building with a five-story clock tower and separate three-story circular tower. Connected to the courthouse is a two-story Italianate style jailhouse built in 1881.
- Old Morgantown Post Office, also known as the Monongalia Arts Center, was built in 1913. The building was originally a federally owned post office designed by Oscar Wenderoth in Classical Revival style. When the post office was moved to a new facility in the early 1970s, the building was purchased by the Tanner family who established the Monongalia County Arts Association, Inc.
- Old Stone House, built about 1796, is a two-story stone structure with a one-story, timber-frame addition built in the early 1900s. It was the home of John W. Thompson, a potter in early Morgantown. It is one of the oldest surviving examples of rustic pioneer architecture in Monongalia County.
- Rogers House, built about 1857, is a two-story brick and wood frame dwelling in the Classical Revival style. The original section of the house is brick. An addition, designed by Elmer Jacobs and built in 1905–1906, is wood frame. It was the home of the Rogers family, pioneer settlers of Morgantown.
- Women's Christian Temperance Union Community Building built in 1922, is a four-story brick structure in the Classical Revival style. It features a smooth-cut stone cornice topped by a balustrade. The building also houses office space, meeting rooms, private apartments, and recreational facilities.
- Walters House also known as the Stone, Gallagher and Byrne Law Offices was built about 1900. The house is a Queen Anne style brick dwelling featuring a three-story tower in the southeast corner topped with a wrought-iron balustrade.

=== Contributing buildings ===
Other contributing buildings within the historic district include various commercial and public buildings, houses, and churches. Significant commercial buildings with the district are the legal offices on Chancery Row (c. 1855) which includes the former office Waitman T. Willey, lawyer and one of the state's first senators. Additional commercial buildings in the district are the Knights of Columbus Building (significant in the labor history of the town), the Curtis Electrical and State Electronics (originally the Davis Brothers garage which features an early patented driving ramp system), and the Monongahela Building (which housed the offices of many coal company executives). Notable houses within the district are the Neville House (1823), the Crow-Garlow-Lewin House, and the John Rogers House (now the Dering Funeral Home, built in the 1840s in the federal style). Churches in the district include the Spruce Street United Methodist Church (built in 1908 and designed by Elmer Jacobs) and Wesley United Methodist Church (built in 1942). The historic district is also home to Morgantown City Hall (1924) and the historic Warner Theater (1931).

== Bibliography ==
- Callahan, James Morton. History of the Making of Morgantown, West Virginia: A Type Study in Trans-Appalachian Local History. Morgantown, WV: Morgantown Printing and Binding Co., 1926.
- Callahan, James Morton. History of West Virginia: Old and New. Chicago and New York: The American Historical Society, 1923.
- Chambers, S. Allen. Buildings of West Virginia. Oxford and New York: Oxford University Press, 2004.
- Core, Earl L. and Mildred S. Clark, eds. Bicentennial of Monongalia County West Virginia 1976. Parsons, WV: McClain Printing Company, 1980.
- Core, Earl. The Monongalia Story: A Bicentennial History, Volumes I-V. Parsons, WV: McClain Printing Co., 1974–1984.
- Rice, Connie Park. Our Story: A History of African Americans in Monongalia County, West Virginia. Terra Alta, WV: Headline Books, Inc., 1999.
- West Virginia University Public History Option. Morgantown: A Bicentennial History. Terra Alta, WV: Pioneer Press of West Virginia, Inc., 1985.
- Wiley, Samuel T. History of Monongalia County, West Virginia, from its First Settlements to the Present Time; With Numerous Biographical and Family Sketches. Kingwood, WV: Preston Pub. Co., 1883.
