= RauteMusik.FM =

Internet radio station

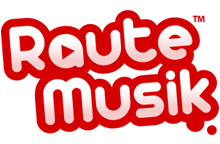
The official logo of RauteMusik.FM

RauteMusik (also RM or #Musik) is an internet radio station based in Germany. RauteMusik was first broadcast on 20 April 2003 with just one main stream. In the next four years, RauteMusik established itself as one of Europe's biggest internet radio stations. Currently up to 37,000 people listen to RauteMusik simultaneously.

== RauteMusik Streams ==
RauteMusik currently has 40 different radio streams:

- Musik.Top40: Chart Hits
- Musik.Main: 80s, Pop, Rock, Charts and new Hits
- Musik.ChartHits: Pop, R'n'B, Dance, Electro
- Musik.Club: Dance, HandsUp, Techno, Trance
- Musik.Rock: Rock, Alternative, Punk
- Musik.Metal: Metal, Heavy Metal, Metalcore, Grindcore
- Musik.JaM: HipHop, R’n’B, Rap, Reggae, Soul, Urban
- Musik.Happy: Feel Good Music
- Musik.Party: Party Hits
- Musik.Workout: 130BPM Beats
- Musik.Deutschrap: German Hip-Hop & Rap
- Musik.House: House, Dance, Electro
- LoveHits.FM: Love Songs and Kuschelsongs
- Musik.Goldies: Oldies, 60s, 70s, 80s
- Musik.Lounge: Ambient, Jazz, Downtempo, Chillout
- Musik.HardeR: Hardstyle, Hardcore, Jumpstyle, Schranz
- Musik.BigCityBeats: House, Electro
- Musik.Oriental: Arabian Music
- Musik.Schlager: German Schlager, Discofox
- Musik.DrumStep: Drum & Bass, Dubstep
- Musik.Christmas: Christmas and Holiday Songs
- Musik.Trance: Trance, Vocal Trance, Uplifting
- Musik.Solo Piano: Piano Composers
- Musik.HappyHardcore: Happy Hardcore and UK Hardcore
- Musik.Country: Country, Western, Americana
- Musik.12Punk: Punk Rock, Ska, Hardcore
- Musik.Kids: Kindermusik, Kinderpop
- Musik.Study: Lo-Fi
- Musik.Salsa: Salsa, Latino, Tropical
- Musik.Trap: Trap, Glitch Hop, Moombahton
- Musik.TechHouse: Tech House, Minimal
- Musik.90s: 90s, Eurodance
- Musik.Sex:
- Musik.Traurig: Loneliness, Sadness
- DAS Coachingradio: Easy Listening, Coaching
- WackenRadio.Com: Metal from the Wacken Open Air Festivals
- BreakZ.FM: Mixtapes, Hip Hop, Dance

Aside from these channels, RauteMusik also licenses out its own proprietary streaming platform to power other internet radio services such as 0nlineradio, Epic Piano, Heavy Radio, Technolovers, Epic Classical, and Epic Lounge. These brands are only used for direct access to their streams on various audio streaming services; these streams are otherwise jointly grouped under the catch-all banner RauteMusik Plus on the main site.
