= Monongalia Arts Center =

Cultural center in Morgantown, West Virginia, US

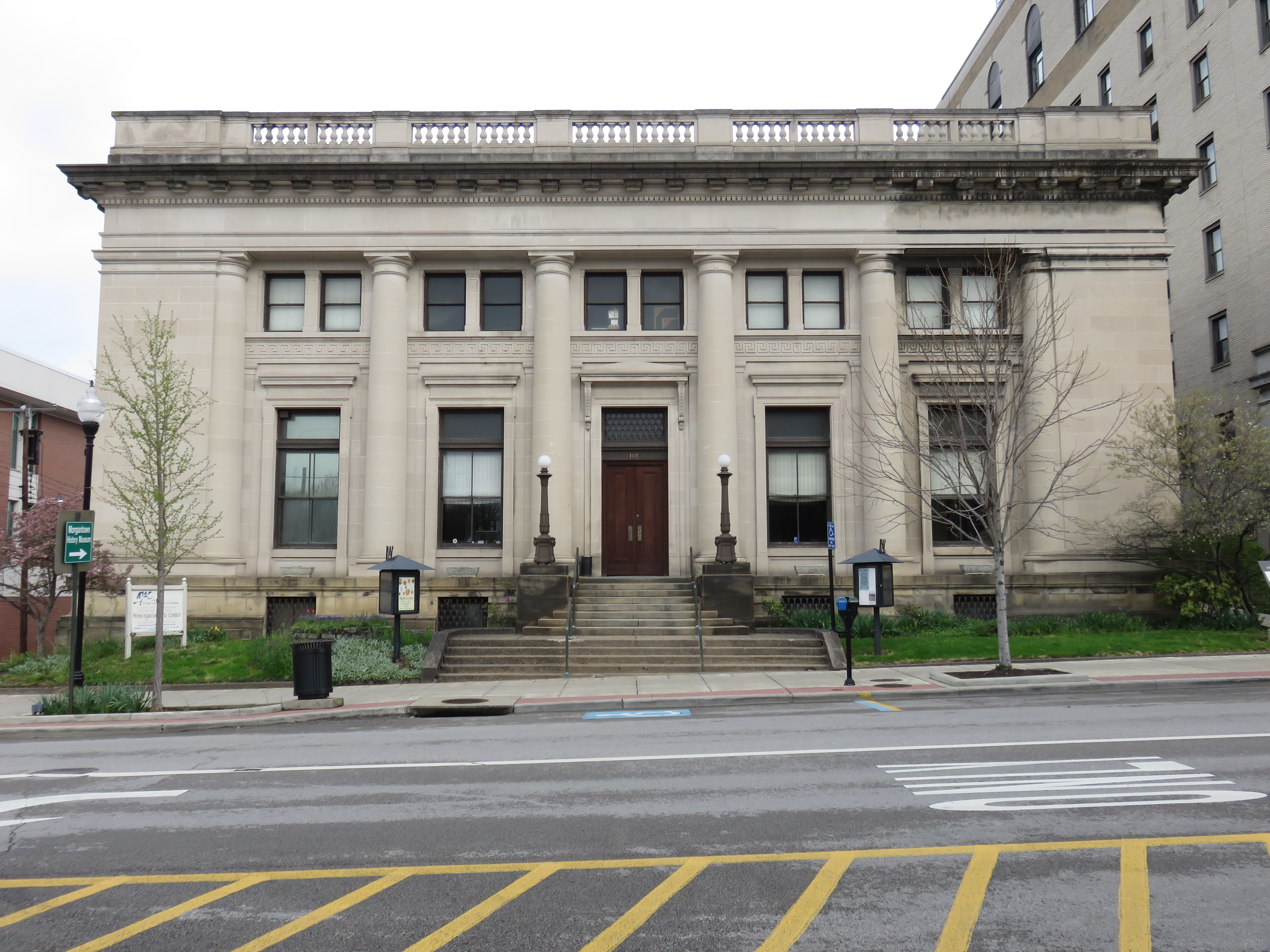
- The museum in 2017
- Established: 1976 (opened 1978)
- Location: Morgantown, West Virginia
- Type: Art museum (fine arts, applied arts, modern art), Theatre
- Director: Ro Brooks
- Website: www.monartscenter.com

The Monongalia Arts Center, or MAC, is located in Morgantown, West Virginia near the campus of West Virginia University. The MAC opened to the public in 1978 as a non-profit arts and culture center, which it remains today. The MAC's mission is "to provide a home for the arts where the work of visual and performing artists is showcased and interest in the arts is nurtured through ongoing educational programs." The building hosts two galleries, a theatre for the performing arts, and is undergoing production on other projects, including an Internet radio station and the establishment of the Tanner Theatre as a regular venue for touring bands. The building is also recognized on the National Register of Historic Places.

== History ==
- Old Morgantown Post Office
- U.S. National Register of Historic Places
- U.S. Historic district – Contributing property
- Location within West Virginia Location within the United States
- Location: 107 High St., Morgantown, West Virginia
- Coordinates: 39°37′41″N 79°57′29″W
- Area: 0.5 acres (0.20 ha)
- Built: 1913
- Architects: Wenderoth, Oscar
- Architectural style: Classical Revival
- NRHP reference No.: 79002593
- Added to NRHP: March 28, 1979

The neoclassical building that houses the Monongalia Arts Center was constructed in 1913 and federally owned until it was purchased in September 1975 by the Louis F. Tanner family. It was designed by Oscar Wenderoth in Classical Revival style. The building served historically as a post office, and it was known as Old Morgantown Post Office.

Mabel Tanner, founder of the Morgantown Players and local art critic for over 40 years, had long since envisioned "a facility complete with theatre, art gallery, exhibit area, classrooms and workshop space, that would house the performing and creative arts and provide a central point from which to foster the arts and encourage their growth." After her death in 1974, her family purchased the building and then established the Monongalia County Arts Association, Inc. in 1976 to begin work upon a community arts center, thus giving birth to Tanner's reverie.

In 1978, after two years of planning and development, the Mon. County Arts Association officially opened the MAC to the public.

In 1979, the MAC was added to the National Register of Historic Places as "Old Morgantown Post Office". It is located in the Downtown Morgantown Historic District, listed in 1996.

== Departments ==
=== Benedum Gallery ===
The Benedum Gallery, made possible through funding from the Claude Worthington Benedum Foundation, was established in 1979. Located on the first floor of the MAC, the gallery displays monthly art exhibits from a variety of cultural and artistic backgrounds. The gallery is handicap-accessible and open during weekdays and Saturday afternoons. Information on each month's gallery is available on location or online at the center's website.

=== Robert M. Davis Gallery ===
The Robert M. Davis Gallery is MAC's second-floor gallery. This gallery was created out of a grass roots effort in 2004 as means to showcase emerging artists and cutting edge art forms. In 2007 and 2008 the Davis Gallery experiences several significant upgrades and was doubled in size due to a grant from the Hazel Ruby McQuain Charitable Trust and community volunteer efforts. The Robert M. Davis Gallery uses a gallery track hanging system and covers over 800 square feet (74 m^{2}) of the second level.

=== Mabel DeVries Tanner Theatre ===
The Mabel DeVries Tanner Theatre was dedicated in 1981, and the room serves as MAC's space for the performing arts. Over the years, the theatre has hosted everything from plays and classic theatre productions to avant-noise music performances. The theatre also functions as a multipurpose space, available to the public for reservations for events such as wedding receptions and other private parties. In 2008, the MAC began regularly booking local and touring bands for shows and concerts in the space.

== Classes ==
The MAC offers classes and workshops in a variety of fields, including classes in Zumba, yoga, and Kindermusik. The center also hosts two free sewing circles, Sew What?! and MACKnitters. On going artists studio sessions for figure drawing are offered all year featuring multiple models and body types. MAC offers the most affordable private music and art lessons in the region as well. Another ongoing program is MAC Improv which meets every Tuesday from 7-9 PM.

== See also ==
- List of United States post offices
