= Walters House (Morgantown, West Virginia) =

Historic house in West Virginia, United States

- U.S. National Register of Historic Places
- U.S. Historic district – Contributing property
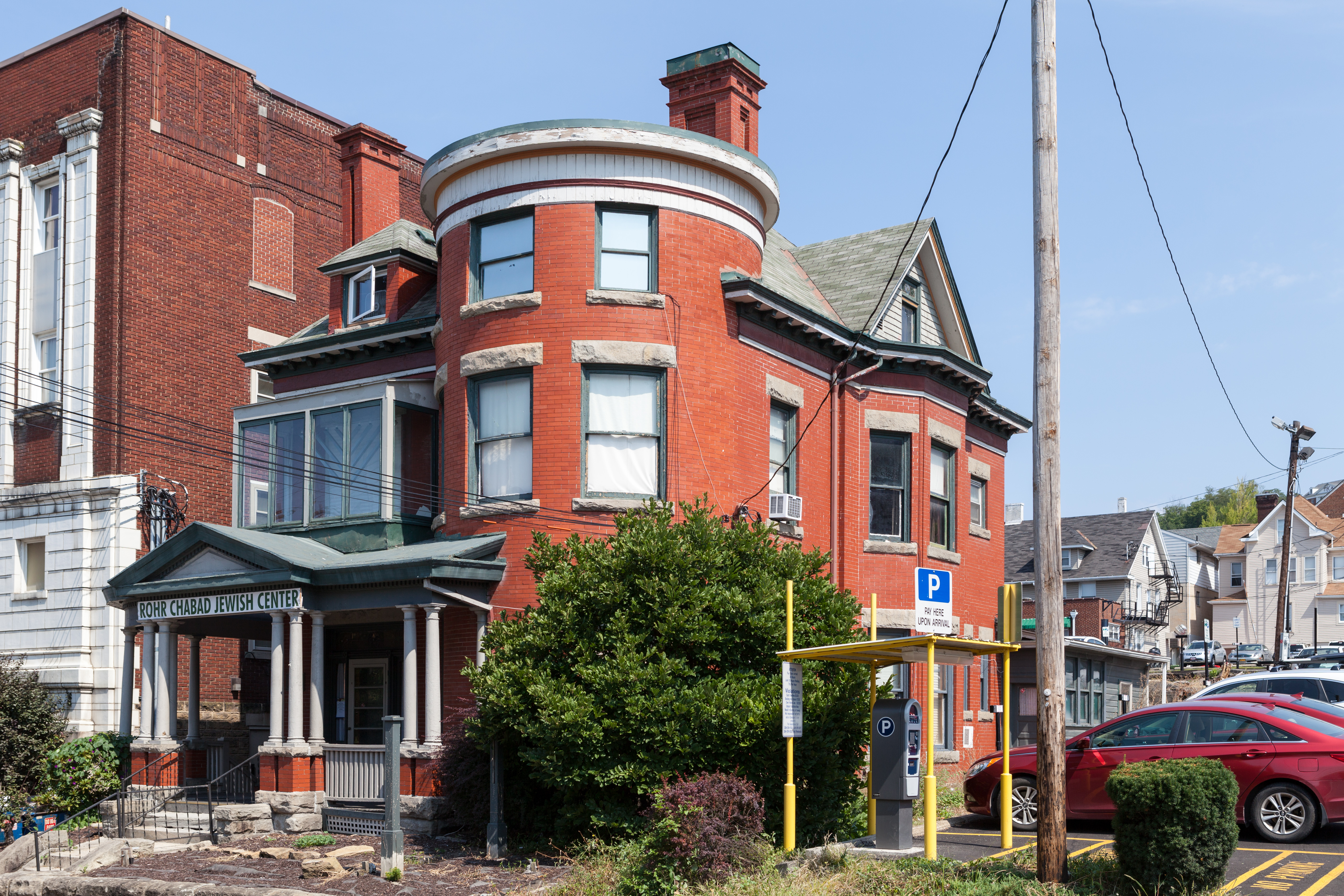
- The house from Willey Street

- Location within West Virginia Location within the United States
- Location: 221 Willey St., Morgantown, West Virginia
- Coordinates: 39°37′55.67″N 79°57′12.42″W
- Area: less than one acre
- Architectural style: Queen Anne
- NRHP reference No.: 83003246
- Added to NRHP: August 18, 1983

Walters House, also as known as the Walters Residence, is a historic home located in Morgantown, Monongalia County, West Virginia. It was built about 1900–1901, and is a brick Queen Anne style brick dwelling. It features a three-story tower in the southeast corner topped with a wrought-iron balustrade. The architect is unknown. It was a single family home until 1931, after which it was a boarding house, fraternity house, home of the University Christian Council, and law offices. It is currently the location of the Morgantown Chabad Jewish Center. It was listed on the National Register of Historic Places in 1983. It is located in the Downtown Morgantown Historic District, listed in 1996.

== Location ==
The Walters Residence is located just outside of the original Morgantown city limits. However, Morgantown expanded its city limits to accommodate its growing population at the same time as when the house was built. At this time, upper-class residents had yet to move out to the high-end suburbs that were developed later in the twentieth century and still lived in large houses in the downtown area.

== History ==
=== Walters and Fling residence ===
In 1899, William E. Glasscock, future governor of West Virginia, and his wife, Mary, sold the land to Mary S. Walters. The house was constructed during Mary's ownership some time before 1902. When Mary S. Walters died in 1913, the property was conveyed to her heirs who later sold the property to Ona Fling in 1920. During the intervening years, city directories show Rev. William H. Berry, the rector of St. Paul's Lutheran Church, and his wife, Venetia, living at the address. The 1920/1921 city directory lists the Sigma Nu fraternity at the address.

Ona Fling lived at the property from around 1920 until she died in 1931. In the later years of her residence, she rented out rooms in the house. Ona Fling's heirs rented the property to tenants who may have operated a boarding house and later, to the Sigma Phi Epsilon and Tau Kappa Epsilon fraternities. By 1945, Elsie Fling Price, one of Ona's heirs, was living in the house and renting out rooms. In 1951, Elsie and the other heirs sold the property to Ivan M. and Ades Shahan Bowers. Ivan Bowers operated Bowers’ Rooming House at 447 High Street in downtown Morgantown.

=== Conversion to campus ministry ===
In 1965, the Bowers conveyed the property to the trustees of the Trinity Episcopal Church of Morgantown who rented the house to students. Around 1971, the Trinity Episcopal Church leased the building to the University Christian Council (UCC), a relatively new ecumenical campus ministry. The campus ministry occupied the first floor and students continued to live in the upper stories.

The University Christian Council emerged from the ecumenical movement within the field of campus ministry, which was active at West Virginia University in the late 1960s. In 1969, the ecumenical campus ministry center was named the Bennett House in honor of Thomas Bennett. Thomas Bennett was a conscientious objector who was killed in Vietnam while serving in the Army Medical Corps. He was posthumously awarded the Congressional Medal of Honor. When he was a student at West Virginia University, Thomas Bennett served as the president of the Campus Ecumenical Council and was very involved in the campus ecumenical movement and social causes. At the peak of the campus ecumenical movement, West Virginia University's campus ministry center included United Methodists, Roman Catholics, Presbyterians, Episcopalians, Lutherans, and Disciples of Christ ministers.

In late twentieth-century Morgantown, many campus ministers, particularly those of liberal Protestant denominations, worked closely with student activists and were involved in social activism. In the 1970s, campus ministers in the Bennett House were involved in a number of student and community projects, including draft, drug, and abortion counseling. The Women's Information Center, which was founded in 1971, operated within the campus ministry until the early 1990s under the direction of Reba Thurmond, United Methodist campus minister. The Center offered anonymous pregnancy testing and pro-choice counseling as well as programs on women's issues. The organization's philosophy was to empower women with information to make their own decisions regarding their sexuality and reproductive lives. In 1973, the Rape Information Service, which became the Rape and Domestic Violence Information Center, opened in the Bennett House. It was a collaborative project of the Women's Information Center, the local National Organization for Women chapter, and the Women's Affairs Committee of WVU. The organization provided services to victims of sexual assault, hosted public programming on sexual assault, and lobbied for legislative changes. Eventually, it outgrew the Bennett House and moved into its own building. Grassroots feminist organizations, like the Women's Information Center and Rape and Domestic Violence Information Center, were established all over the country during the late-twentieth century revival of the women's movement.

The Trinity Episcopal Church disagreed with some of the activities of the University Christian Council, specifically the Women's Information Center. Eventually, the disagreement caused the UCC to move out of the Walters Residence in 1979. The UCC moved to a building of the old downtown hospital which no longer exists, and then to the Rogers House, where it has been located since 1984.

=== Conversion to law offices and Chabad house ===
In 1981, the Walters Residence was conveyed to SGB, Inc. The office of Stone, Gallagher, and Byrne, attorneys and CPAS opened at the location in 1982. SGB, Inc. rented the upper stories and basement to students.

In 2004, the property was sold to Benton Financiers Inc. who sold the property to Chabad of Morgantown Inc. in 2014. The Chabad Jewish Center of Morgantown was established in 2007 and uses the Walters Residence as a Chabad House. It is one of over 110 on-site campus Chabads across America.
