= Metropolitan Theatre (Morgantown, West Virginia) =

- U.S. National Register of Historic Places
- U.S. Historic district – Contributing property
- Metropolitan Theatre in 2015

- Location within West Virginia Location within the United States
- Location: 371 S. High St., Morgantown, West Virginia
- Coordinates: 39°37′51″N 79°57′20″W
- Area: 0.3 acres (0.12 ha)
- Built: 1924
- Architect: Charles W. Bates
- Architectural style: Classical Revival
- NRHP reference No.: 84003631
- Added to NRHP: January 12, 1984

Metropolitan Theatre is a historic theater building located at Morgantown, Monongalia County, West Virginia. It opened July 24, 1924, two-and-a-half years after construction began, and consists of a single floor auditorium with balcony. The building measures 72 feet by 143 feet, and has two storefronts on the ground floor and a pool room in the basement. The front facade features fluted concrete Ionic order pilasters with egg-and-dart detail in the Classical Revival style. The theater continues to provide a home for the city's best live entertainment.

It was listed on the National Register of Historic Places in 1984. It is located in the Downtown Morgantown Historic District, listed in 1996.

== Gallery ==
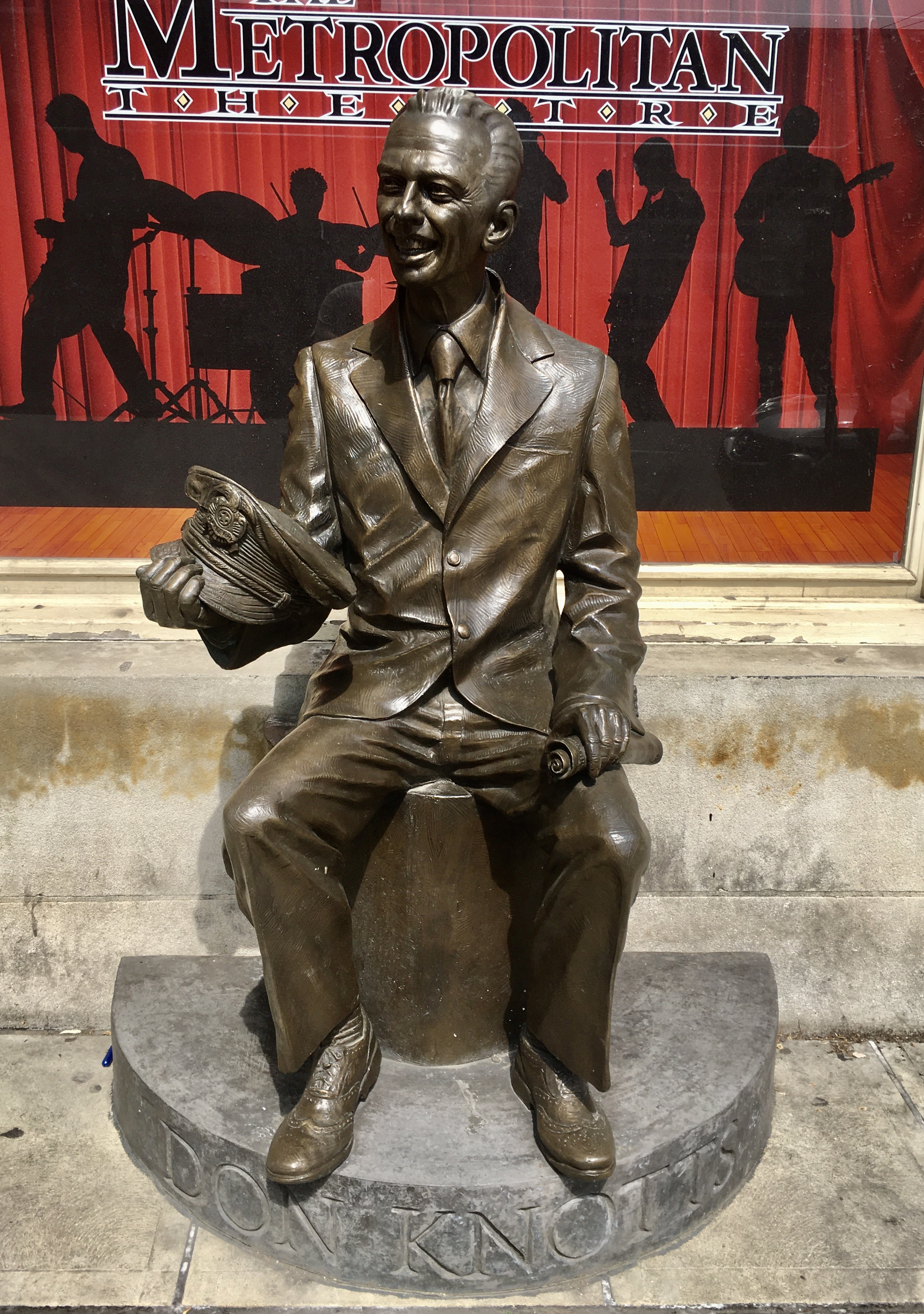
Don Knotts statue.

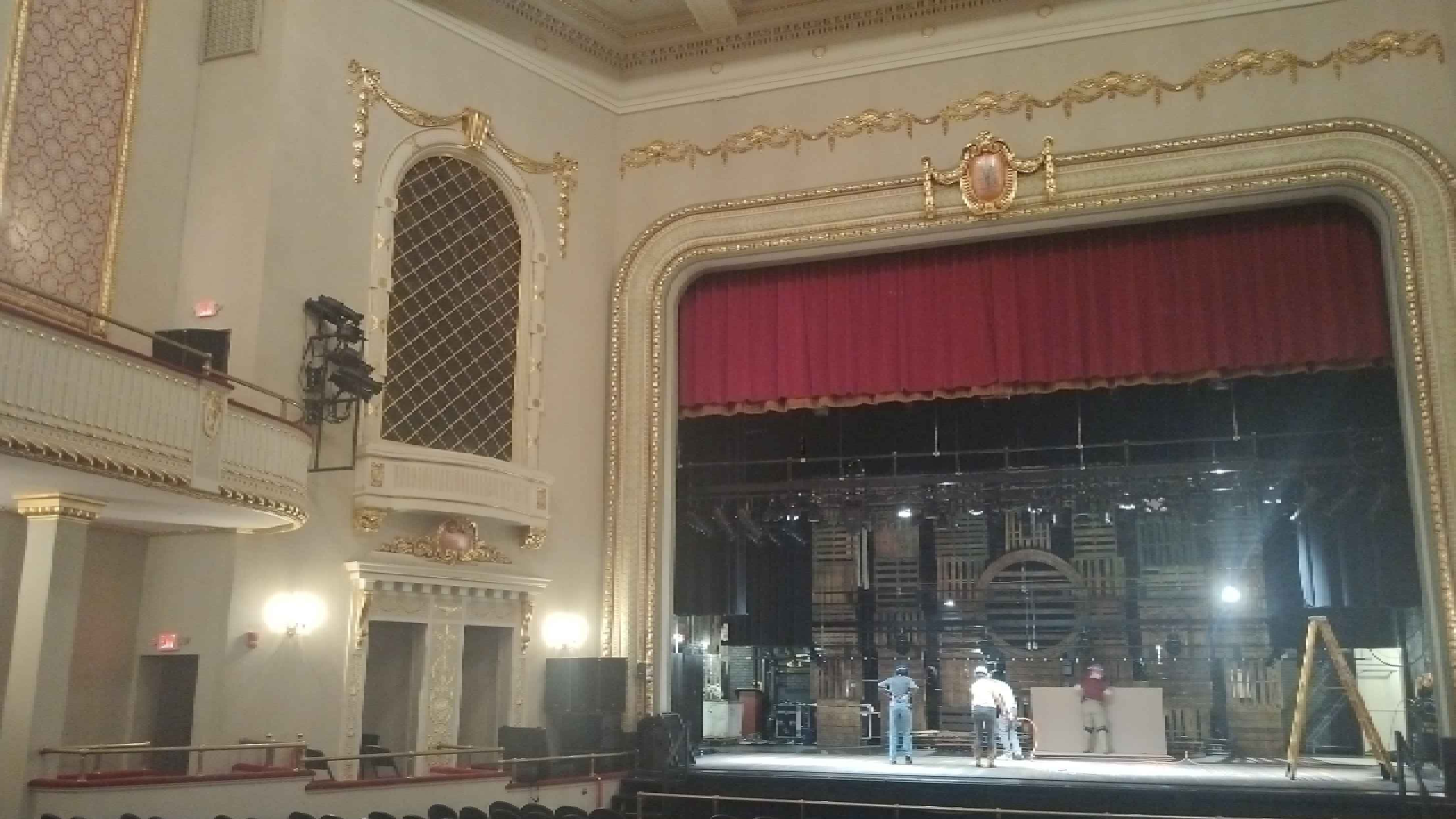
Stage right of the proscenium from center house.

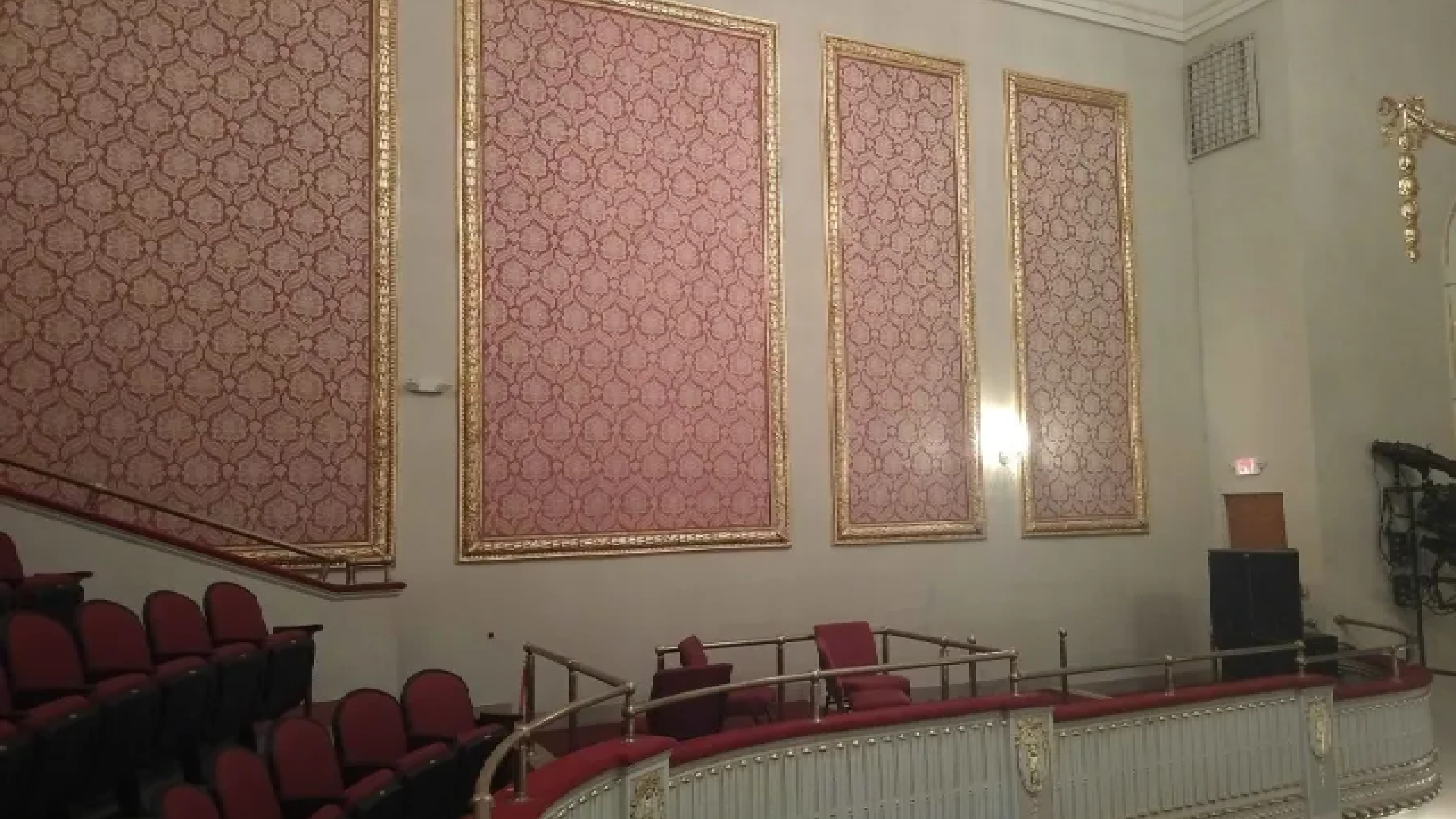
House left balcony.

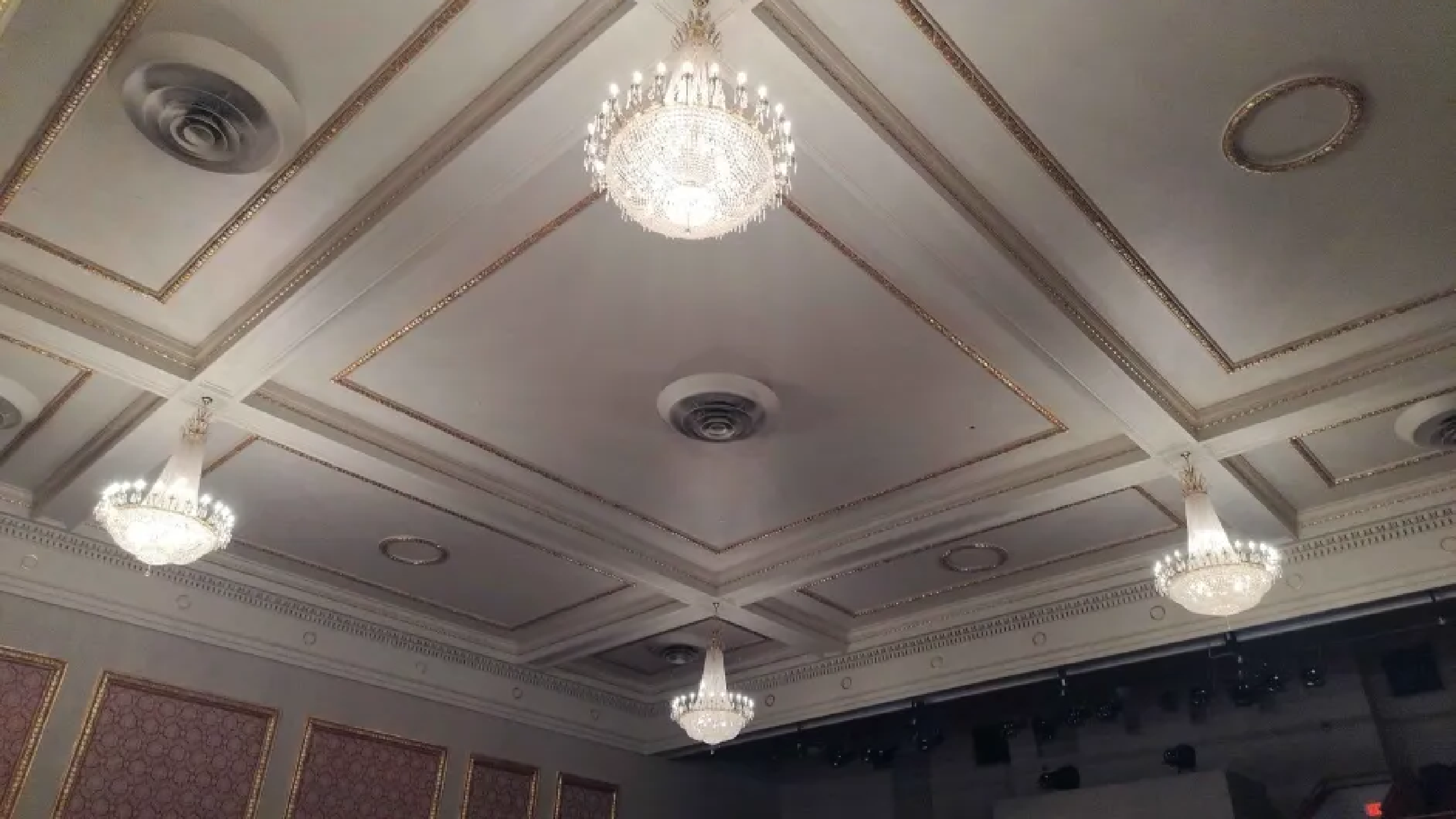
House ceiling.

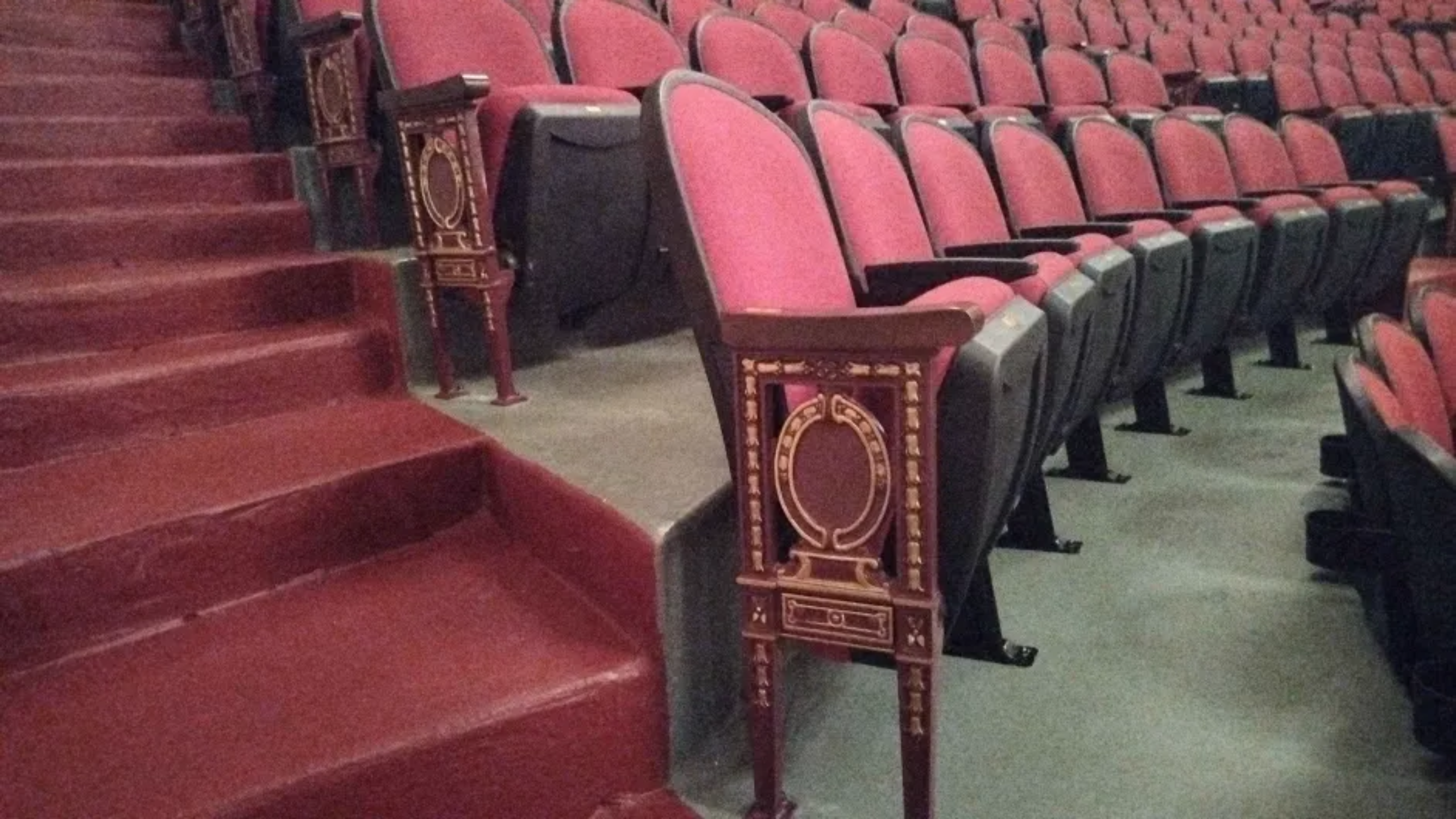
Balcony seating.

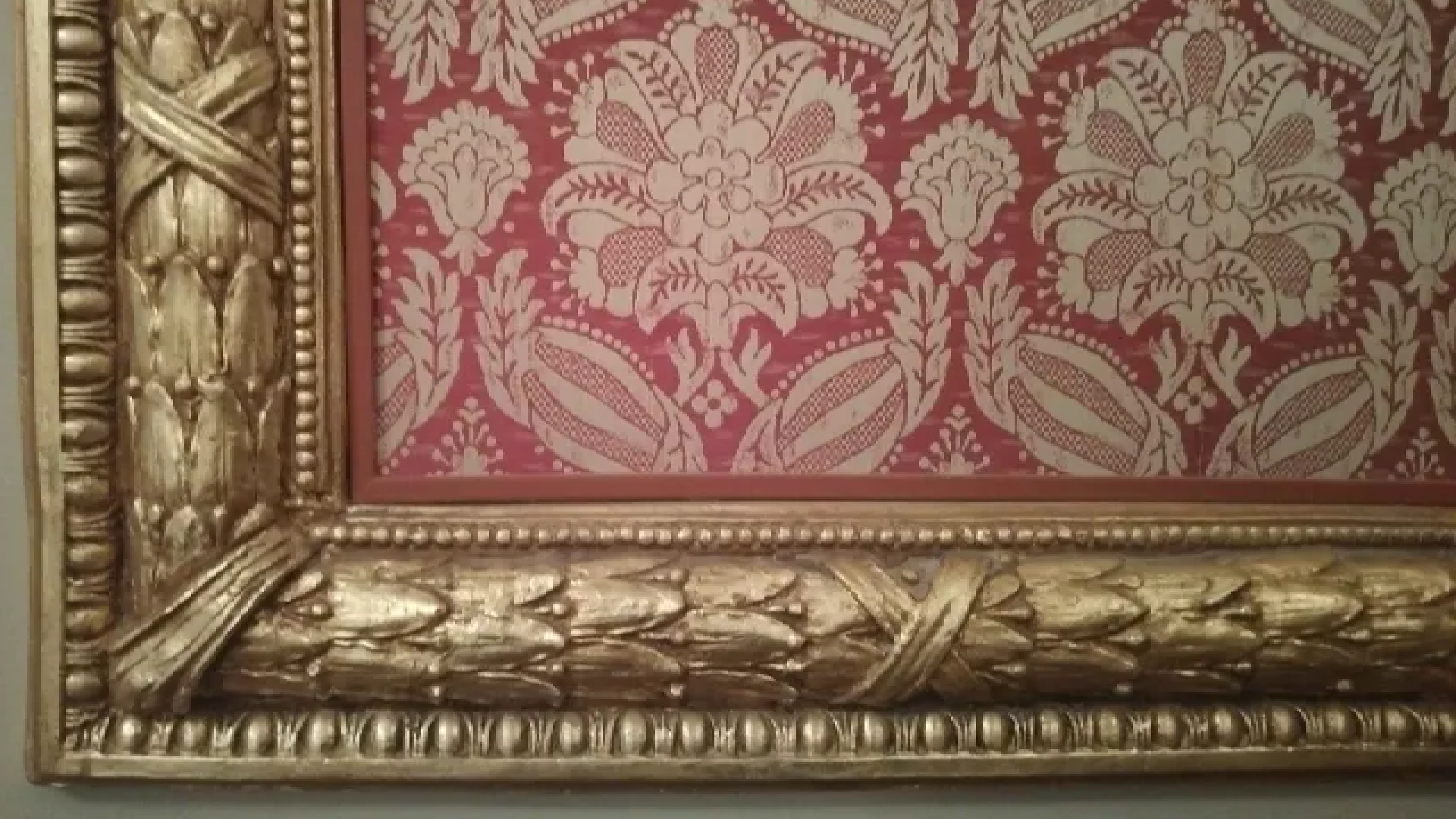
Balcony canvas border (bottom left).
