= Women's Christian Temperance Union Community Building =

- U.S. National Register of Historic Places
- U.S. Historic district – Contributing property
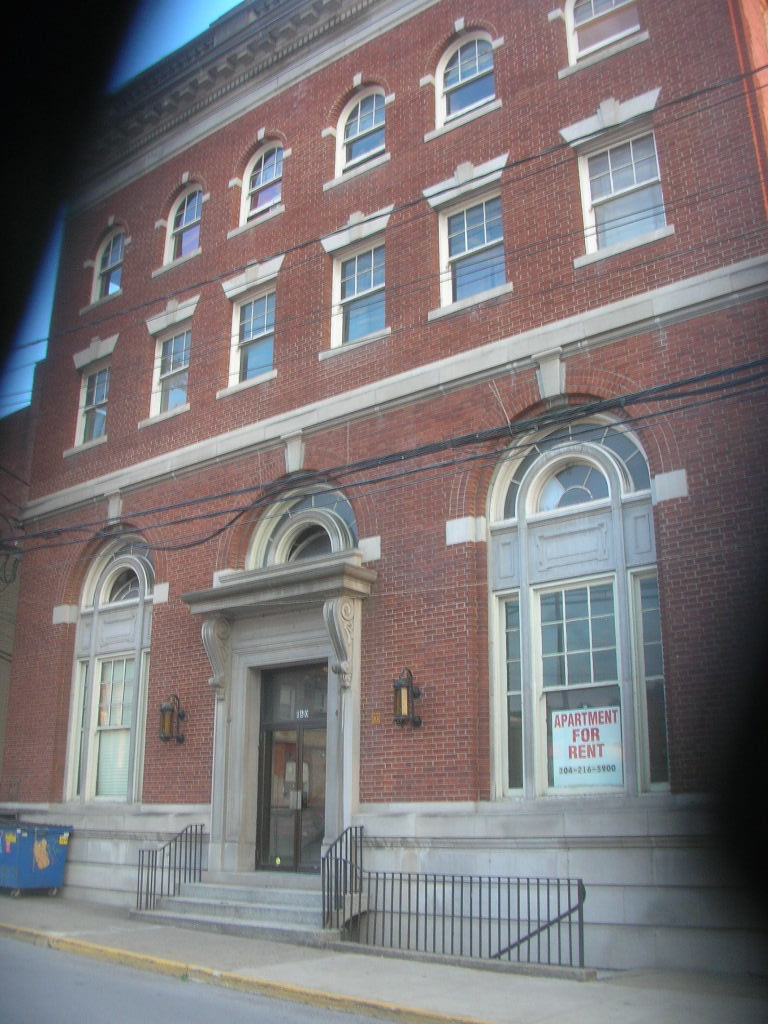
- WCTU Building, June 2012

- Location within West Virginia Location within the United States
- Location: 160 Fayette St., Morgantown, West Virginia
- Coordinates: 39°37′52″N 79°57′22″W
- Area: 0.3 acres (0.12 ha)
- Built: 1922
- Architect: Reger, Carl
- Architectural style: Classical Revival
- NRHP reference No.: 85003406
- Added to NRHP: October 30, 1985

Women's Christian Temperance Union Community Building, also known as the WCTU Building, is a historic building at 160 Fayette Street in Morgantown, Monongalia County, West Virginia. It was built in 1922 by the Woman's Christian Temperance Union, and is a detached, brick, four-story plus basement structure in the Classical Revival style. It features a smooth-cut stone cornice topped by a balustrade. The interior has a two-level basement that houses a large gymnasium. The building also houses office space, meeting rooms, private apartments, and recreational facilities.

It was listed on the National Register of Historic Places in 1985. It is located in the Downtown Morgantown Historic District, listed in 1996.
