= Dering Building =

- U.S. National Register of Historic Places
- U.S. Historic district – Contributing property
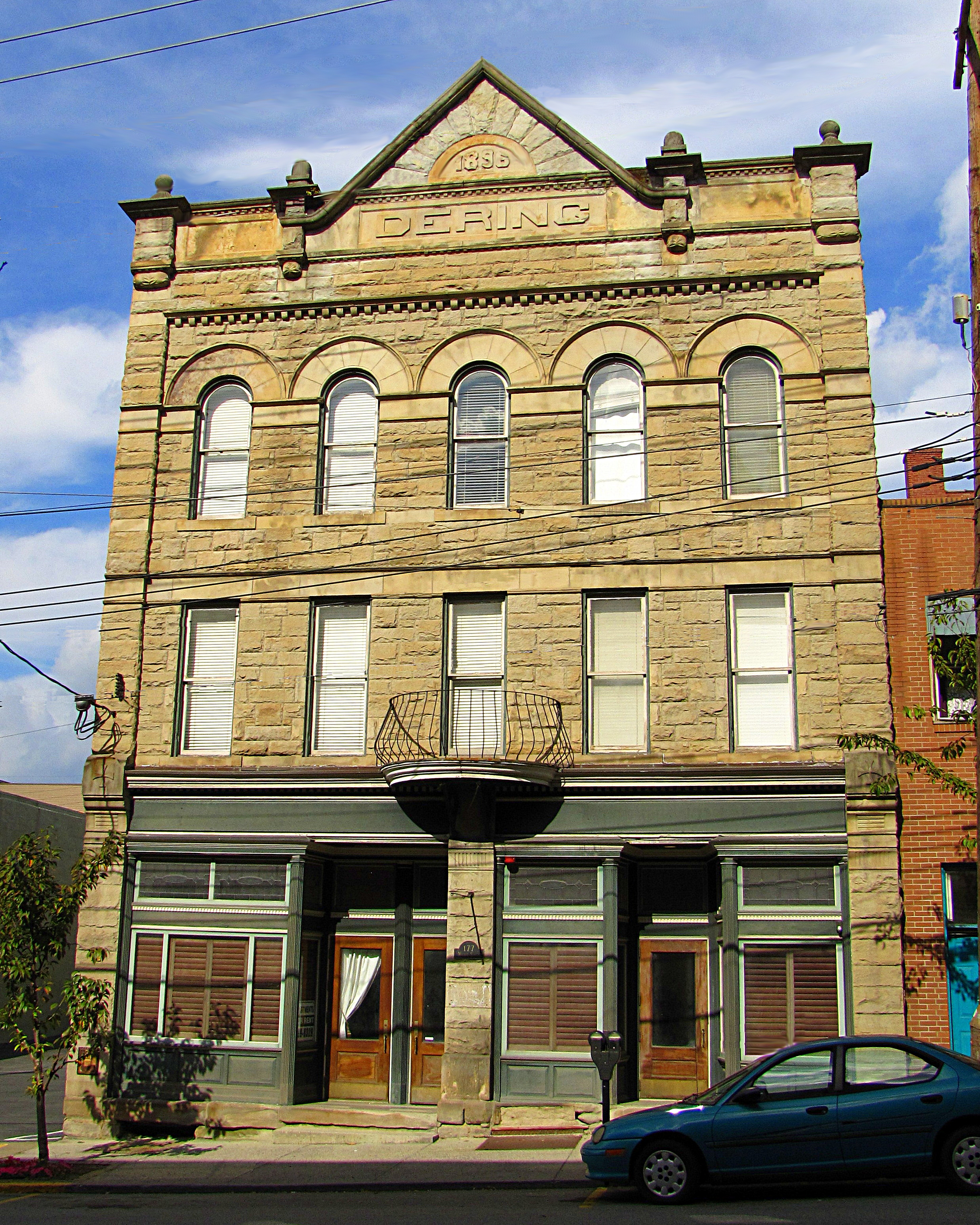

- Location within West Virginia Location within the United States
- Location: 175-177 Walnut St., Morgantown, West Virginia
- Coordinates: 39°37′49″N 79°57′25″W
- Area: less than one acre
- Architect: Elmer F. Jacobs
- Architectural style: Romanesque
- NRHP reference No.: 94001288
- Added to NRHP: November 4, 1994

Dering Building is a historic commercial building located at Morgantown, Monongalia County, West Virginia. It was designed by noted Morgantown architect Elmer F. Jacobs and built in 1896. It is a three-story Romanesque Revival style brick building. It has a rectangular plan, a flat roof, separate store fronts, and recessed portico entrances. It features a pediment above the flat roof with a rising sun motif and the date of construction inscribed in the center.

It was listed on the National Register of Historic Places in 1994. It is located in the Downtown Morgantown Historic District, listed in 1996.
