= Elmer F. Jacobs =

American architect

- Died: 1945; Morgantown, West Virginia
- Occupation: Architect

Elmer F. Jacobs (died 1945) was a Morgantown, West Virginia-based architect.

He graduated from West Virginia University worked under J. I. Beatty, one of Pittsburgh, Pennsylvania's, best known architects. He came to Morgantown in 1893 and set up business. He was the leading residential architect in Morgantown, building in both Queen Anne Revival and Neo-Classical Revival styles. He also built the post office building, a portion of the Seneca Glass Works, the additions to West Virginia University's Woodburn Hall, and several commercial buildings in downtown Morgantown. He was a member of the American Institute of Architects.

He died in 1945 in Morgantown, West Virginia.

== Selected works ==
- 1896: Dering Building, Morgantown, West Virginia, listed on the National Register of Historic Places in 1994.
- 1898: Brown Building, Morgantown, West Virginia, listed on the National Register of Historic Places in 1985.
- 1898: Judge Frank Cox House, Morgantown, West Virginia, listed on the National Register of Historic Places in 1984.
- 1902: Seneca Glass Company Building, Morgantown, West Virginia, listed on the National Register of Historic Places in 1985.
- Additions to the Rogers House, Morgantown, West Virginia, listed on the National Register of Historic Places in 1984.
- Additions to Woodburn Hall, Morgantown, West Virginia, listed on the National Register of Historic Places in 1974.
- He also designed the Spruce Street United Methodist Church (1908) in the Downtown Morgantown Historic District.
