= Kindermusik International =

American music education company

Kindermusik International, Inc.
- Company type: Corporation
- Industry: Music education
- Founded: 1978
- Headquarters: Greensboro, North Carolina, United States
- Area served: Worldwide
- Key people: Scott Kinsey, CEO, Kelly Green, President
- Products: Kindermusik program
- Website: www.kindermusik.com

Kindermusik International is an American music education corporation headquartered in Greensboro, North Carolina. The company develops the curricula used by licensed Kindermusik Programs. Kindermusik is a method of early childhood education and is one of the most widely recognized music education programs for young children.

== History ==
In the 1960s in West Germany, a group of teachers developed a program they called "Musikalische Früherziehung" (early musical instruction). The goal of the program was to teach children about music before they were old enough to begin formal music instruction. This program was eventually adapted for use in the United States and was renamed Kindermusik.

In the 1980s the Kindermusik program was rolled out to countries around the world. In 2002, the company's employees purchased the company from its 96 investors.

As of 2020, there were over 5,000 licensed Kindermusik instructors teaching classes around the world.

== Curriculum ==
Kindermusik offers classes structured around singing, games, movement to music, and listening activities for all age groups (and their parents) between birth and 7 years. The philosophy of Kindermusik education involves parents as the most important teachers and the home environment as the most important place to learn.

The following classes are typically offered:

- Village - Village is designed for babies up to 18 months, along with a caregiver. Classes are held once a week for 15 weeks for 45 minutes and provide an opportunity for the baby to learn through music and movement.
- Our Time - For children from 18 months to 3 years, Our Time fosters communication, self-confidence, and self-control. For 15 weeks, the child attends the weekly 45 minute class with a caregiver. Children are encouraged to sing, dance, listen and play instruments.
- Imagine That - This course is designed for children aged 3 to 5 and encourages socialization, sharing and participation in group activities. Children are often asked to use their imaginations. Once again, this class meets once a week for 15 weeks for 45 minutes, however the caregiver only participates for the last 15 minutes of class.
- Young Child - Young Child classes are conducted once a week for 15 weeks and last from 60 to 75 minutes. This class is designed as a precursor to starting formal music lessons. Children learn basic musical symbols and play a variety of instruments (e.g., keyboards, stringed and woodwind instruments).
- Music Box - This program is designed for 3 to 5 year olds who attend preschool. Thirty minute classes are offered weekly for 10 weeks. The program is designed to foster self-expression and creativity through age-appropriate music and movement activities.
- Summer Camp - A five session Kindermusik summer camp for all children aged newborn to 7 years. Classes are offered for different age ranges.
- Sign and Sing - Designed for hearing children aged 6 months to 3 years, Sign and Sing is a five-week course. Classes are held once a week for 40–50 minutes. Children are introduced to more than 50 signs presented through music and play.
- Family Time - This class is designed for families with multiple children. Classes are held once a week for 10 weeks and last 40–50 minutes. Basic musical concepts are introduced weekly and then structured free time is provided for the whole family to learn together.

Winter, spring, and summer sessions are usually offered. A theme is chosen for each session and home materials are provided. Typically, home materials include a music CD, books, an instrument, and a carrying case.

== Study ==
In 2003, Kindermusik International awarded a grant to two professors in Applied Developmental Psychology at George Mason University (Fairfax, VA). The professors conducted a study titled "The Role of Music in the Development of Self-Regulation in Preschool Children." The study concluded that children that were currently enrolled in Kindermusik exhibited more self-control than those not currently enrolled. Musical exposure seemed to increase self-control in the four-year-olds included in the study when compared to those with less music exposure.

The study also tested the effect of "clean-up" music which was played while the children were putting toys away, concluding that the music had no impact on the children's willingness to clean (or lack thereof), but did make things easier for parents.
