= Monongalia County Courthouse =

- U.S. National Register of Historic Places
- U.S. Historic district – Contributing property
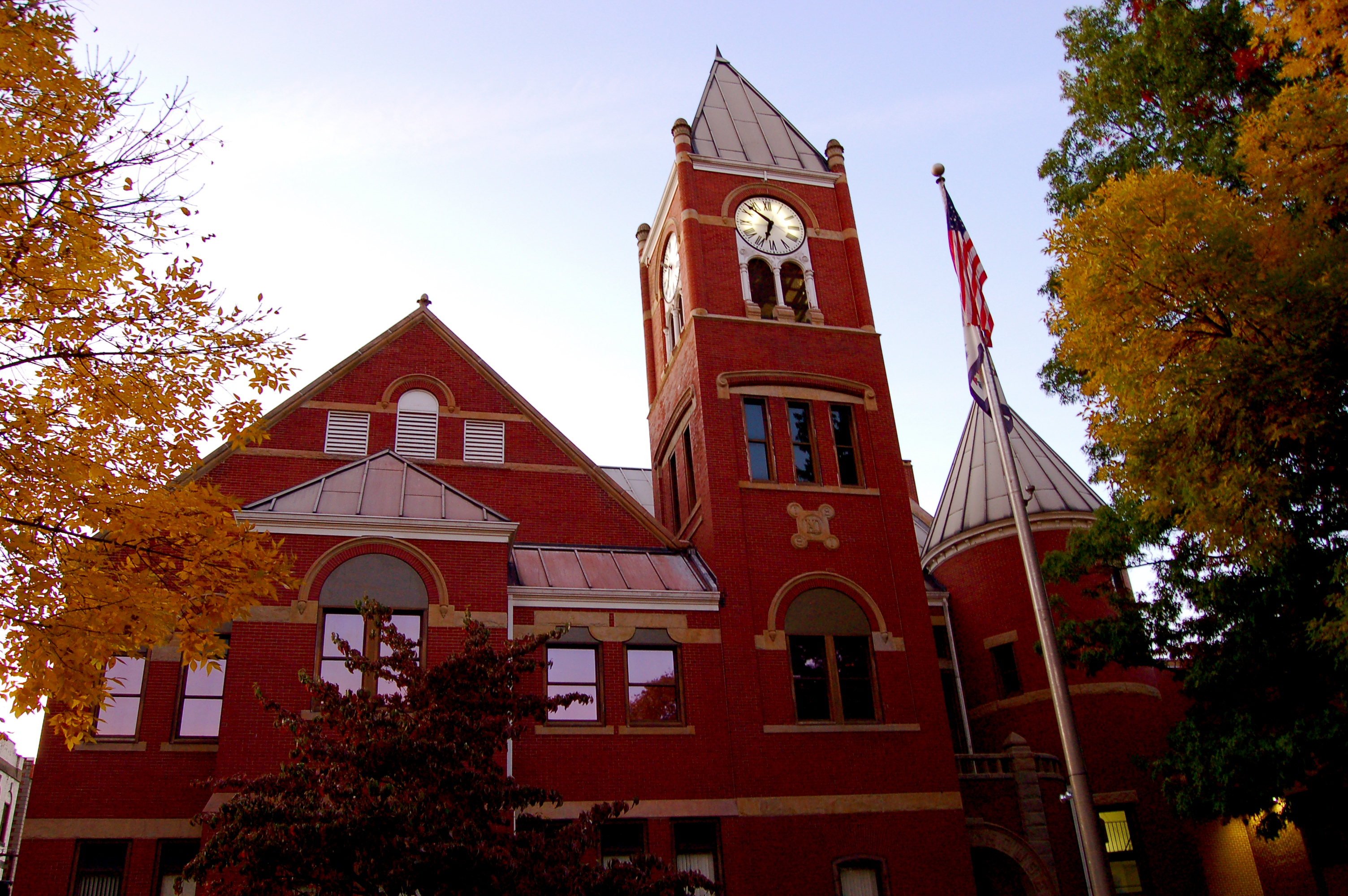
- Monongalia County Courthouse, October 2008

- Location within West Virginia Location within the United States
- Interactive map showing the location of Monongalia County Courthouse and Jail
- Location: 243 High St., Morgantown, West Virginia
- Coordinates: 39°37′47″N 79°57′26″W
- Area: 0.5 acres (0.20 ha)
- Built: 1881, 1891
- Architect: James P. Bailey
- Architectural style: Italianate, Romanesque
- NRHP reference No.: 85001525
- Added to NRHP: July 8, 1985

Monongalia County Courthouse is a historic courthouse building located in Morgantown, Monongalia County, West Virginia. A courthouse was erected in 1784. The current structure built in 1891. This Romanesque style building consists of a two-story building with a basement, five-story clock tower and a three-story South tower. The building measures at 99’ by 83’ by 99’ by 76’ with the first story at fifteen feet high and the second story at twenty-two feet high. The distinctive central clock tower has a pyramidal roof, four doomed buttresses, stone molds over the four clocks and tower windows, arcade belfry, and quatrefoil design with the building date. The original northern facade was covered by an addition built in 1925 with another addition built in 1975. Connected to the courthouse is a two-story Italianate style jailhouse built in 1881.

It was listed on the National Register of Historic Places in 1985. It is located in the Downtown Morgantown Historic District, listed in 1996.

== History ==
The Monongalia County Courthouse, located at 243 High Street, predates the town of Morgantown, West Virginia by one year. The Romanesque building is the fourth courthouse built on the same site and serves as the headquarters of the county government. The first two buildings were frame structures with the first being built in 1784 costing $250 and the second in 1796 after a fire destroyed the building. The frame structure building was succeeded by a two-story brick building completed in 1802. The courthouse was then replaced by another two-story brick building in 1848 costing $6,500. In 1851 a wooden statue of Patrick Henry was placed on top of the courthouse in honor of his governance of the state of Virginia in 1776 when the county of Monongalia was created. This statue is currently standing in the turret of the present courthouse.

In 1884 the courthouse was declared dangerous. The County Court began making plans for a new building and in 1887 James P Bailey, an architect from Pittsburgh, Pa, was hired for $25.00 to design a new courthouse. There was much opposition from the townspeople which resulted in two failed proposed bond issues for a new courthouse. On September 13, 1890, county officials removed the records from the courthouse at midnight and began demolition on the building. The townspeople sought a court injunction to stop further work but the court officials had all left town and no local lawyer would represent them.

On June 20, 1891, West Virginia Day, the cornerstone of the Victorian Romanesque style brick and stone building was laid. The structure was built by George W. L. Mayers building contracting firm for the price of $53,478. The building was later finished that year. In 1976 the courthouse was renovated and an annex was added on at the cost of $1.5 million. This is the current state the courthouse is in today.

Up until 1881, the courtyard was the site of the public whipping post, stocks and pillories. Today the courtyard is used for public meetings, street fairs, political rallies, and markets.
