= Judge Frank Cox House =

Historic house in West Virginia, United States

- U.S. National Register of Historic Places
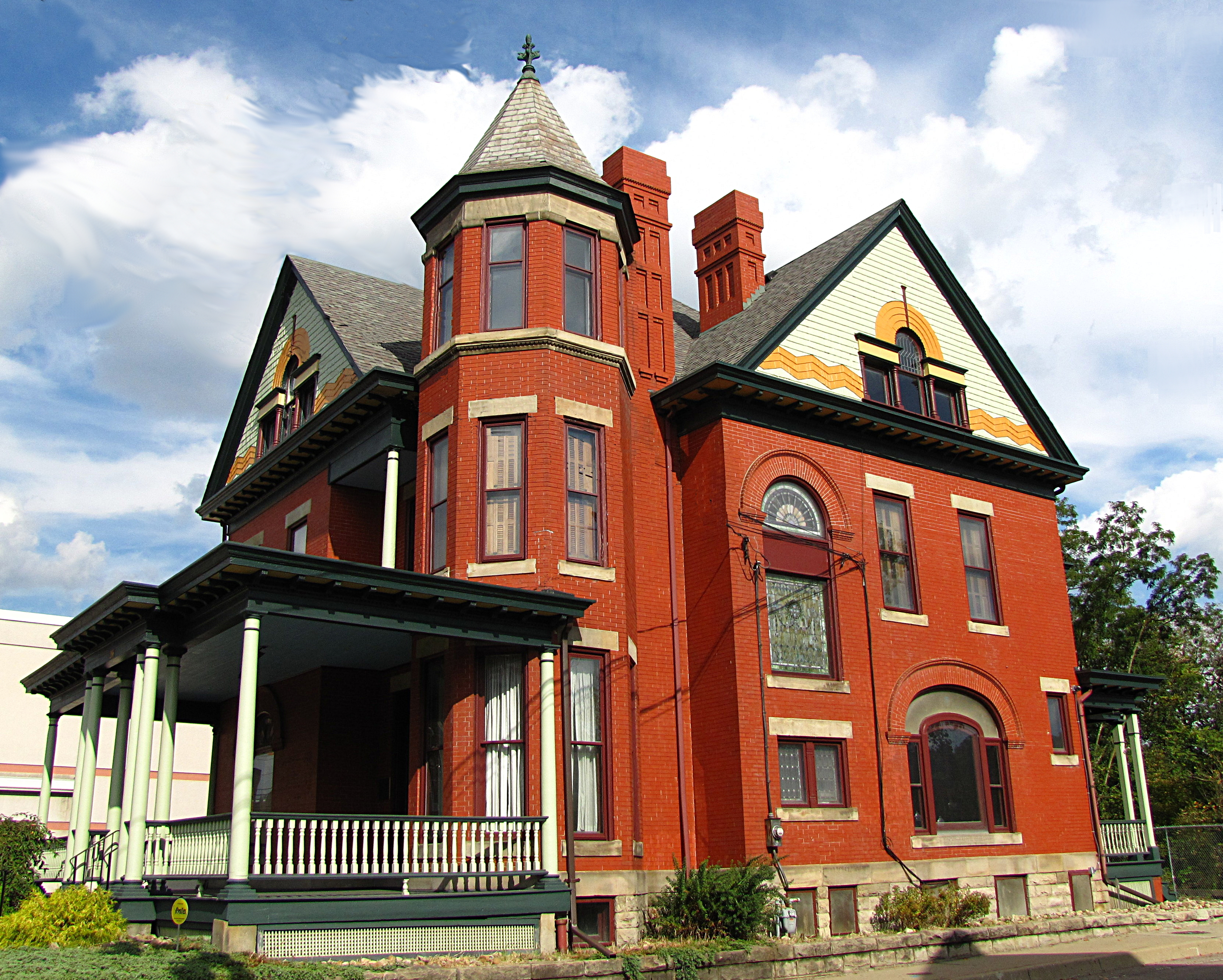

- Location within West Virginia Location within the United States
- Location: 206 Spruce St., Morgantown, West Virginia
- Coordinates: 39°37′27″N 79°57′20″W
- Area: less than one acre
- Built: 1898
- Architect: Elmer F. Jacobs
- Architectural style: Queen Anne
- NRHP reference No.: 84003626
- Added to NRHP: January 12, 1984

Judge Frank Cox House is a historic home located at Morgantown, Monongalia County, West Virginia. It was designed by Morgantown architect Elmer F. Jacobs and built in 1898. It is a 2 1/2-story Queen Anne style brick dwelling. It features a three-story tower, ornate wood porches, stained glass windows and elaborate interior woodwork. It was the home of Judge Frank Cox, a prominent lawyer who served as prosecuting attorney and Judge on the Supreme Court of Appeals of West Virginia.

It was listed on the National Register of Historic Places in 1984.
