= Rogers House (Morgantown, West Virginia) =

Historic house in West Virginia, United States

- U.S. National Register of Historic Places
- U.S. Historic district – Contributing property
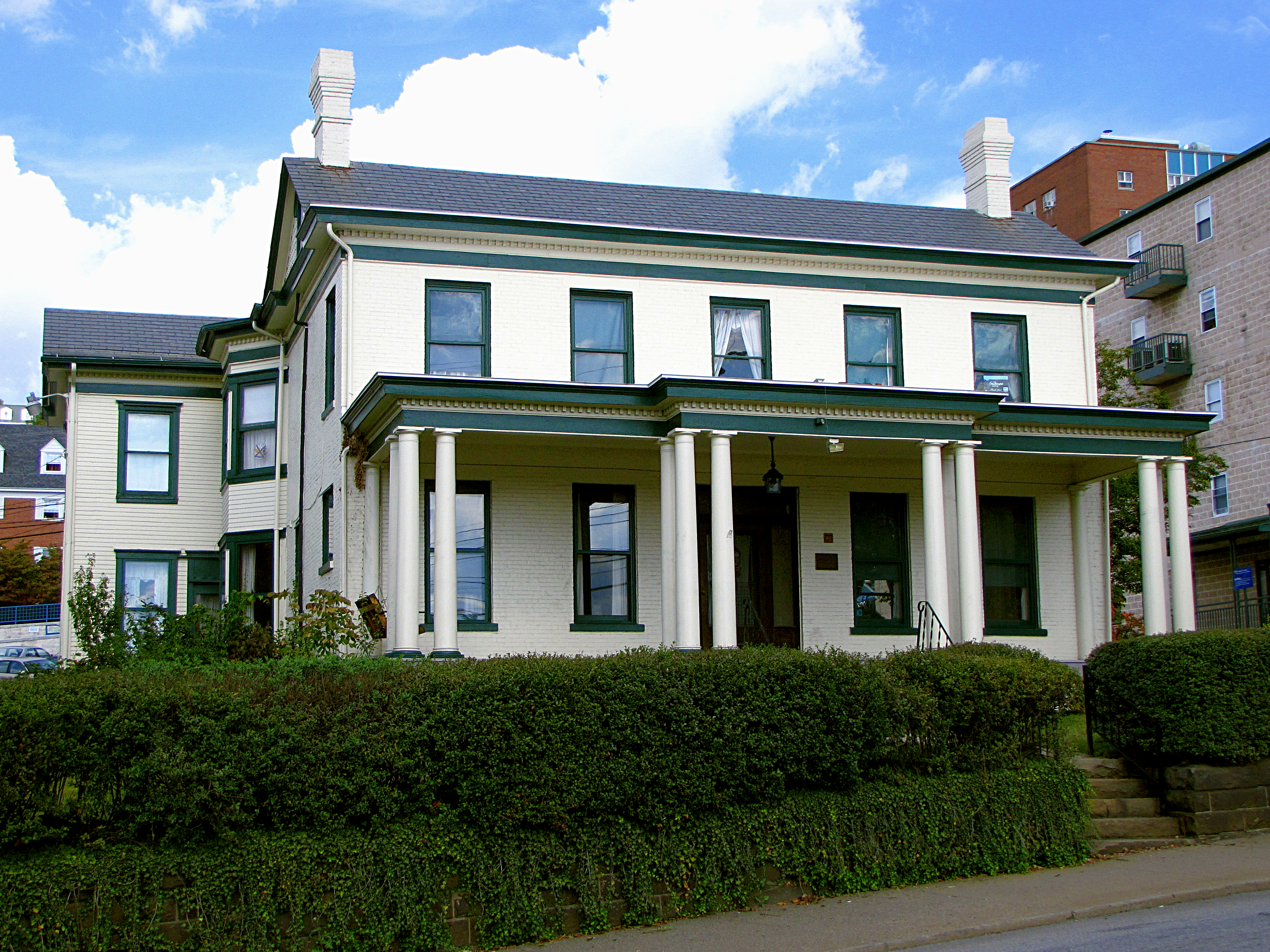

- Location within West Virginia Location within the United States
- Location: 293 Willey St., Morgantown, West Virginia
- Coordinates: 39°37′53″N 79°57′9″W
- Area: 0.3 acres (0.12 ha)
- Built: c. 1857, 1905-1906
- Architect: Wells, Moses; Elmer F. Jacobs
- Architectural style: Classical Revival
- NRHP reference No.: 84000683
- Added to NRHP: December 4, 1984

Rogers House is a historic home located at Morgantown, Monongalia County, West Virginia. It was originally built about 1857 and is one of the last remaining residences from this time period in downtown Morgantown. The building is a two-story, five bay brick and wood frame dwelling in the Classical Revival style. The original section of the house is in brick, whereas the addition, designed by noted Morgantown architect Elmer F. Jacobs and built in 1905-1906 is wood frame. Jacobs is also responsible for the interior design. It sits on a rough-faced coursed ashlar stone foundation. It features a front porch with four sets of triple wooden, Tuscan order columns. It was the home of the Rogers family, pioneer settlers of Morgantown. It has been the home of West Virginia University's Campus Ministry Center since 1984. It was listed on the National Register of Historic Places in 1984. It is located in the Downtown Morgantown Historic District, listed in 1996.

The property on which the Rogers House is located passed through multiple owners before the building was constructed. The house was built sometime between 1855, when Alpheus Wells purchased the property from William E. Staggers, and 1868, when Alpheus sold the property to Thomas Rogers. The National Register nomination form dates the building to circa 1857. In the 1850s, the area around the property was undeveloped. The Rogers House was one of the first large residences built at the outer edge of Morgantown's contemporary city limits. In the late nineteenth and early twentieth century, Morgantown witnessed an intense period of industrialization and demographic growth that engulfed the Rogers House. It currently sits between downtown Morgantown and West Virginia University's downtown campus.

The Rogers family were pioneer settlers of Morgantown. John Rogers was a prominent local businessman who owned a large amount of property as well as saw, grist, and paper mills. John Rogers’ son, Thomas Rogers, inherited his property. Thomas Rogers was active in the local Escopalian. According to Earl Core's The Monongalia Story, the Trinity Episcopal Parish was organized at Thomas Roger's house in 1876. Thomas Rogers’ son, George Rogers, inherited the property when Thomas Rogers died in 1894. George Rogers was also active in the Episcopal Church and a businessman. He is known for developing the Woodburn and East Morgantown neighborhoods. George Rogers, his wife Louise Clemson Brown, and their daughters, Mary Washington and Louise Clemson, moved into the Rogers House in the late 1890s. The Rogers family rented rooms to students, which was a common practice at the time because there were no university dormitories.

When George Rogers died in 1920, the Rogers House was conveyed to his wife who was living at the house with her daughter and son-in-law, Louise and Harlan Selby. Her other daughter and son-in-law, Mary and Bradford Laidley, moved back into the Rogers House after George Rogers’ death. Bradford Laidley and Harlan Selby opened an office supply business called Laidley and Selby Office Equipment. The business, which was located at 417 High Street, was in operation from 1923 to 1974. Louise Rogers, George Roger's widow, conveyed the Rogers House to Laidley and Selby in the 1930s.

The Rogers House was a private residence until Bradford Laidley and Hale J. Poston, who had acquired Selby's half-interest in the house, donated the property to the Loyalty Permanent Endowment Fund of the Alumni Association of West Virginia University. Despite the donors’ intentions, the Loyalty Permanent Endowment Fund did not relocate to the Rogers House. Instead, the Fund leased the Rogers House to the University Christian Council (UCC), an ecumenical campus ministry organization, in 1983. Known as the Campus Ministry Center, the ecumenical campus ministry has occupied the Rogers House since 1984. West Virginia University's ecumenical campus ministry was previously housed in a building on the Evansdale campus, an office building on High Street, the Walters Residence which is a few houses down the street, and in a building of the old downtown hospital which no longer exists.

The University Christian Council emerged from the ecumenical movement within the field of campus ministry, which was active at West Virginia University in the late 1960s. In 1969, the ecumenical campus ministry center was named the Bennett House in honor of Thomas Bennett. Thomas Bennett was a conscientious objector who was killed in Vietnam while serving in the Army Medical Corps. He was posthumously awarded the Medal of Honor. When he was a student at West Virginia University, Thomas Bennett served as the president of the Campus Ecumenical Council and was very involved in the campus ecumenical movement and social causes. At the peak of the campus ecumenical movement, West Virginia University's campus ministry center included United Methodists, Roman Catholics, Presbyterians, Episcopalians, Lutherans, and Disciples of Christ ministers.

In late twentieth-century Morgantown, many campus ministers, particularly those of liberal Protestant denominations, worked closely with student activists and were involved in social activism. In the 1970s, campus ministers in the Bennett House were involved in a number of student and community projects, including draft, drug, and abortion counseling. When the campus ministry moved to the Rogers House in the 1980s, traces of this activism remained. The Women's Information Center, which was founded in 1971, operated within the campus ministry until the early 1990s. The Center offered pregnancy testing and pro-choice counseling as well as programs on women's issues.

In 1991, the Westminster Foundation of West Virginia, a Presbyterian U.S.A. non-profit entity, purchased the property for campus ministry to West Virginia University and as a main office for the organization. The Campus Ministry Center at the Rogers House has been home to the Wesley Foundation (campus ministry for the United Methodist Church), Mountaineer Campus Ministry (campus ministry for the Southern Baptist Convention), the Court-appointed Special Advocates for Kids of Monongalia and Preston Counties (CASA)and Mon County Habitat for Humanity. The Campus Ministry Center is currently home to the Presbyterian Student Fellowship, the Intervarsity Christian Fellowship and International Student Ministry, and the West Virginia Land Trust.
