= Brown Building (Morgantown, West Virginia) =

- U.S. National Register of Historic Places
- U.S. Historic district – Contributing property
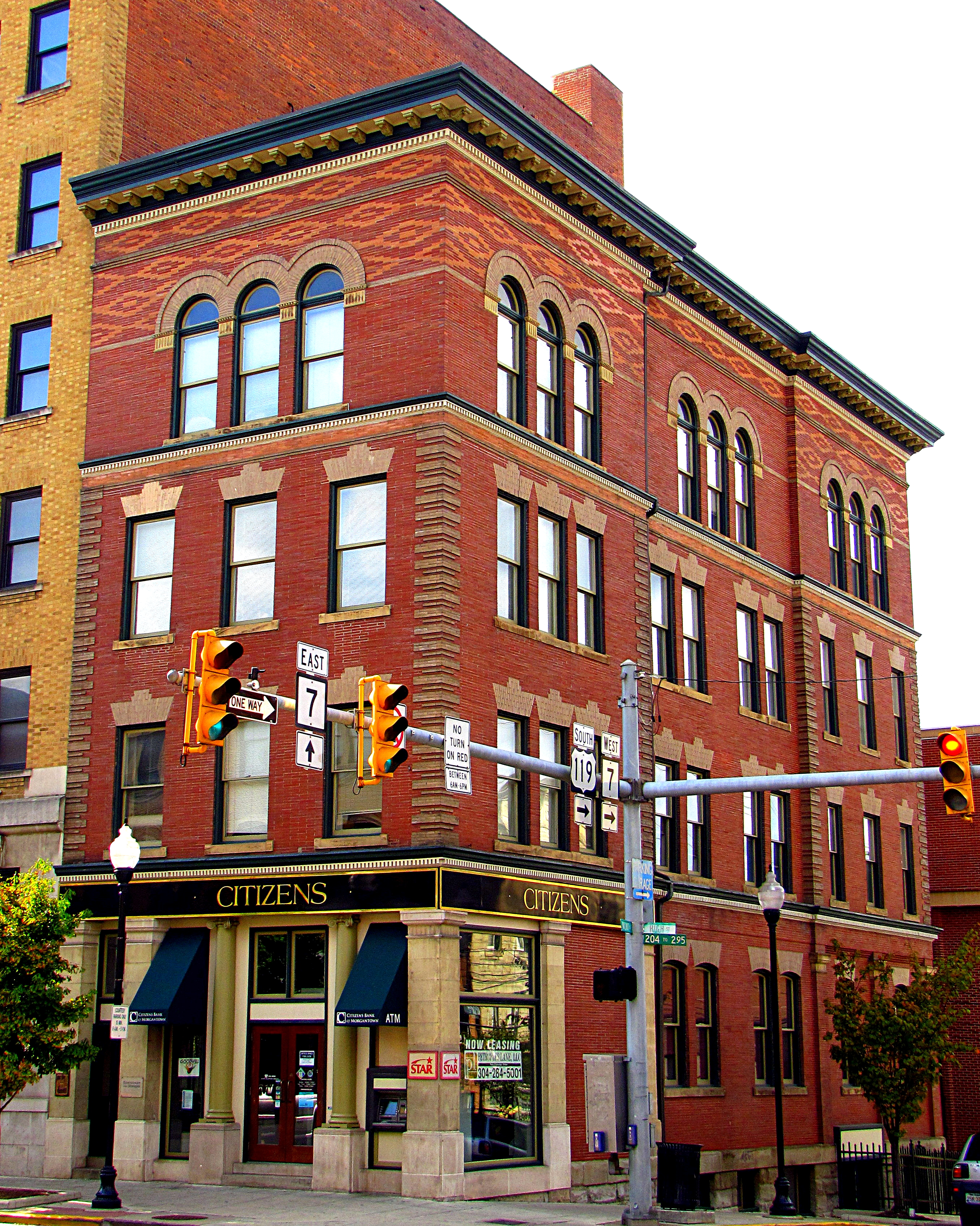

- Location within West Virginia Location within the United States
- Location: 295 High St., Morgantown, West Virginia
- Coordinates: 39°37′47″N 79°57′22″W
- Area: less than one acre
- Built: 1898
- Architect: Elmer F. Jacobs
- Architectural style: Eclectic
- NRHP reference No.: 85001514
- Added to NRHP: July 8, 1985

Brown Building, also known as the Ream Building, is a historic commercial building located at Morgantown, Monongalia County, West Virginia. It was designed in 1898 by noted Morgantown architect Elmer F. Jacobs. It is a four-story eclectic style brick building. It has a flat roof and projecting cornice. It has a ball finial and parapet centered on the front facade. It features polychromatic brick detailing, accentuated bays and a triad of double-sash windows

It was listed on the National Register of Historic Places in 1985. It is located in the Downtown Morgantown Historic District, listed in 1996.
