= South Park Historic District (Morgantown, West Virginia) =

Historic district in West Virginia, United States

- U.S. National Register of Historic Places
- U.S. Historic district
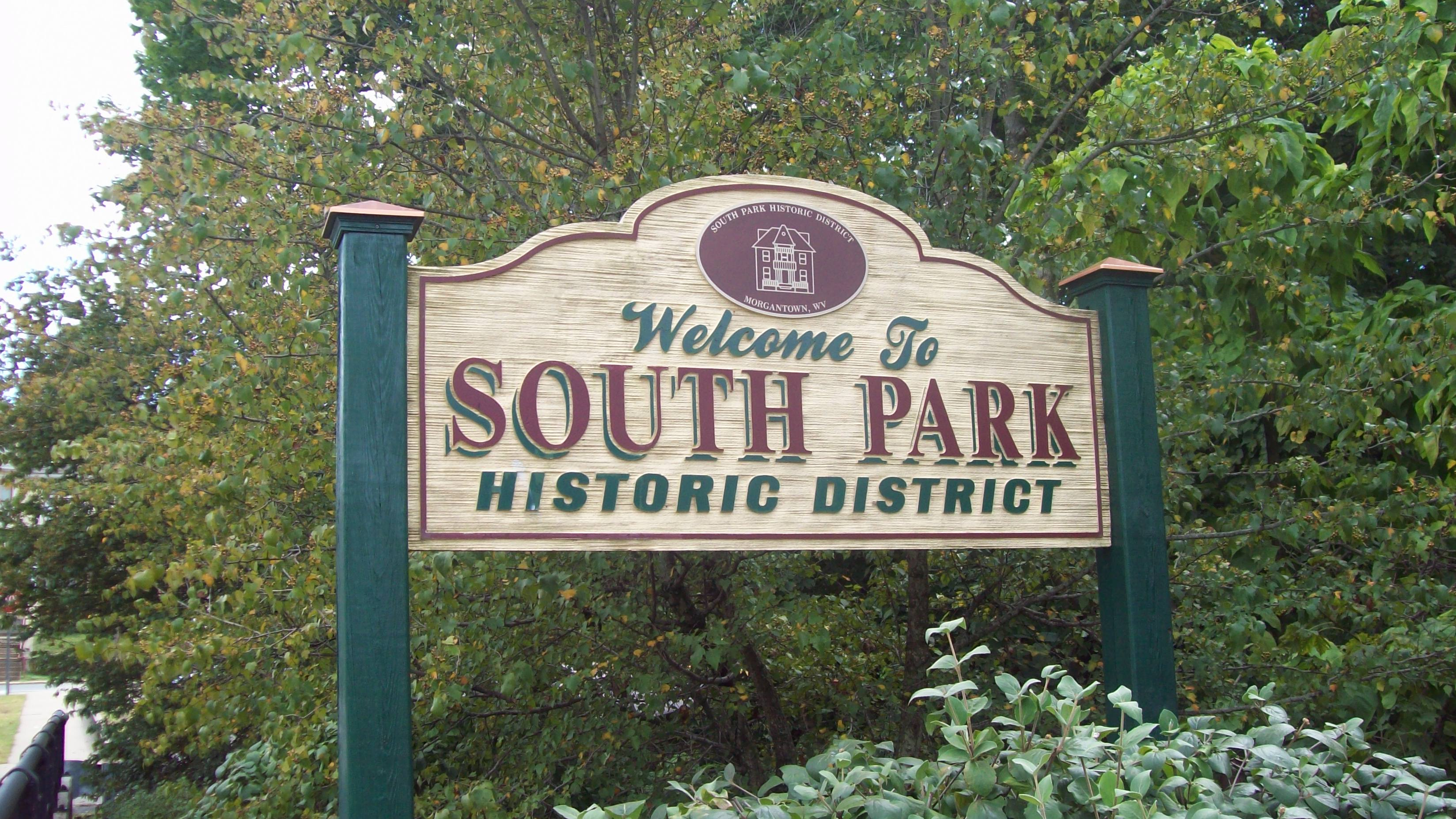

- Location within West Virginia Location within the United States
- Location: Roughly bounded by Elgin St., Kingwood St., Cobun Ave., Prairie Ave., Jefferson St., Lincoln Ave., and Grand St., Morgantown, West Virginia
- Coordinates: 39°37′21″N 79°57′8″W
- Area: 86 acres (35 ha)
- Architect: Multiple
- Architectural style: Late 19th And Early 20th Century American Movements, Late 19th And 20th Century Revivals, Late Victorian
- NRHP reference No.: 90001054
- Added to NRHP: July 23, 1990

South Park Historic District is a national historic district located at Morgantown, Monongalia County, West Virginia. The district includes 501 contributing buildings and 5 contributing structures in a primarily residential area south of downtown Morgantown. The district is characterized by tightly packed dwellings on a hillside and represent a variety of post-Victorian architectural styles popular between 1900 and 1940. Notable buildings include the First Church of Christ, Scientist, Morgantown High School, Crestholm Pharmacy, and Bobbette's Confectionary.

It was listed on the National Register of Historic Places in 1990.
