= Kindermusik =

Early childhood education music and movement program

Founded in the United States in 1978, Kindermusik is an early childhood education music and movement program for children from infants to 7 years of age (2nd grade in elementary school). It is based on a kindergarten music and movement program developed by educational experts in Germany in the 1960s. When developing Kindermusik's curriculum, the original creative team drew on the works of esteemed musicians and educators from Europe and Asia, including Shinichi Suzuki, Maria Montessori, Zoltán Kodály, Emile Jaques-Dalcroze and Carl Orff.

Within a few years, Kindermusik programs had expanded into Canada, and, from there, around the world. More than 1 million families in at least 60 countries have attended Kindermusik classes in programs worldwide.

The Kindermusik curriculum is based on the research of the original creators, but has been revised as the curriculum development team examines emerging research in child development, music and education. The program uses high-quality recordings, instruments, and award-winning literature books along with traditional nursery rhymes, fingerplays and songs to build a strong foundation of not only music education, but other areas of development, including cognitive, emotional, social, physical, and language development.

The phrase is German for children's music.

Kindermusik International is a company based in the United States that develops the curricula and materials used by Licensed Kindermusik Programs around the world.

"Kindermusik (Demo)" is the name of a five-song demo tape independently released by New York City based industrial metal band Hanzel und Gretyl in 1994.

== See also ==
- Music education for young children
- Baby music
