= List of oncogenic bacteria =

Bacteria involved in causing and treating cancers

This is a list of bacteria that have been identified as promoting or causing:

- Uncontrolled growth of tissue in the body
- Cancer
- Carcinomas
- Tumors (including benign or slow growing)
- Neoplasms
- Sarcomas
- Precancerous lesions
- Coinfectious agent promoting the above growths

== Species or genera ==
Species or genera	Possibly associated cancers	Ref
Bacteroides fragilis	Colon cancer.	
Borrelia burgdorferi	MALT lymphoma.	
Campylobacter jejuni	Immunoproliferative small intestinal disease (IPSID), which is rare a type of MALT lymphoma.	
Chlamydia pneumonia	Lung MALT lymphoma.	
Chlamydia trachomatis (chlamydia)	Cervical cancer.	
Chlamydophila psittaci	Ocular/adnexal lymphoma (forms of eye cancer).	
Clostridium ssp	Colon cancer.	
Cutibacterium acnes	Bladder and prostate cancer.	
Fusobacterium nucleatum	Colorectal cancer	
Helicobacter bilis	Biliary cancers (such as gallbladder and biliary tract cancers).	
Helicobacter bizzozeronii	Gastric MALT lymphoma.	
Helicobacter felis	Gastric MALT lymphoma.	
Helicobacter heilmannii	Marginal zone B-cell lymphoma of the stomach.	
Helicobacter hepaticus	Biliary cancer.	
Helicobacter pylori	Stomach cancer, Marginal zone B-cell lymphoma of the stomach, and bile duct cancer	
Helicobacter salomonis	Gastric MALT lymphoma.	
Helicobacter suis	Gastric MALT lymphoma.	
Mycoplasma spp	Stomach, colon, ovarian, and lung cancers (particularly M. fermentans, M. penetrans, M. hyorhinis).	
Neisseria gonorrhoeae (gonorrhea)	Bladder cancer and possibly prostate cancer.	
Salmonella enterica serovar Paratyphi	Biliary cancer.	
Salmonella enterica serovar Typhimurium	Biliary cancer.	
Streptococcus bovis	Colorectal cancer	
Treponema pallidum (syphilis)	Bladder cancer and possibly prostate cancer.	

== See also ==
- Carcinogenic bacteria
- Sexually transmitted disease
- Infectious causes of cancer
- Chronic diseases and cancers linked to infectious microbes
- List of infectious diseases
- Timeline of peptic ulcer disease and Helicobacter pylori - featured list
