= Helicobacter heilmannii s.s =

Helicobacter heilmannii s.s.

Scientific classification
- Domain: Bacteria
- Kingdom: Pseudomonadati
- Phylum: Campylobacterota
- Class: "Campylobacteria"
- Order: Campylobacterales
- Family: Helicobacteraceae
- Genus: Helicobacter
- Species: H. h. s.s.

Binomial name
- Helicobacter heilmannii s.s. Paster et al., 1991

Species of bacterium

Helicobacter heilmannii s.s. (H. heilmannii s.s.) is a species within the Helicobacter genus of Gram negative bacteria. Helicobacter pylori (H. pylori) is by far the best known Helicobacter species primarily because humans infected with it may develop gastrointestinal tract diseases such as stomach inflammation, stomach ulcers, duodenal ulcers, stomach cancers of the non-lymphoma type, and various subtypes of extranodal marginal zone lymphomas, e.g. those of the stomach, small intestines, large intestines, and rectum. H. pylori is also associated with the development of bile duct cancer and has been associated with a wide range of other diseases although its role in the development of many of these other diseases requires further study. Humans infected with H. heilmannii s.s. may develop some of the same gastrointestinal diseases viz., stomach inflammation, stomach ulcers, duodenal ulcers, stomach cancers that are not lymphomas, and extranodal marginal B cell lymphomas of the stomach. Other non-H. pylori Helicobacter species that are known to be associated with these gastrointestinal diseases are Helicobacter bizzozeronii, Helicobacter suis, Helicobacter felis, and Helicobacter salomonis. Because of their disease associations, these four Helicobacter species plus H. heilmannii s.s. are often group together and termed Helicobacter heilmannii sensu lato. (Helicobacter heilmannii s.s. is used to designate a specific species within the Helicobacter heilmannii group; "s.s" is appended to its name in order to distinguish it from the Helicobacter heilmannii group.)

H. heilmannii s.s. bacteria are detected in the stomachs of their natural hosts viz., cats, dogs, foxes, lynxes, and non-human primates. Reports suggest that individuals, including children, are infected with this bacterium by having close contact with one of these animals: H. heilmannii s.l.-associated diseases, including those associated with H. heilmannii s.s., appear to be zoonotic diseases, i.e., infectious diseases that are caused by pathogens that spread from animals to humans. It is important to diagnose H. heilmannii as well as the other Helicobacter heilmannii sensu lato infections in patients with the cited upper gastrointestinal tract diseases, including in particular extranodal marginal zone lymphoma of the stomach, because some of them have been successfully treated and cured using antibiotic-based drug regimens (e.g.amoxicillin, clarithromycin, plus a proton pump inhibitor such as lansoprazole, or metronidazole, clarithromycin, plus a proton pump inhibitor) directed against the instigating bacterium.
