= Helicobacter felis =

Scientific classification
- Domain: Bacteria
- Kingdom: Pseudomonadati
- Phylum: Campylobacterota
- Class: "Campylobacteria"
- Order: Campylobacterales
- Family: Helicobacteraceae
- Genus: Helicobacter
- Species: H. felis

Binomial name
- Helicobacter felis Paster et al., 1991

Species of bacterium

Helicobacter felis is a bacterial species in the Helicobacteraceae family, Campylobacterales order, Helicobacter genus. This bacterium is Gram-negative, microaerophilic, urease-positive, and spiral-shaped. Its type strain is CS1T (= ATCC 49179T). It can be pathogenic.

Helicobacter pylori (H. pylori) is by far the best known Helicobacter species, primarily because humans infected with it may develop gastrointestinal tract diseases such as stomach inflammation, stomach ulcers, duodenal ulcers, stomach cancers of the nonlymphoma type, and various subtypes of extranodal marginal zone lymphomass, e.g. those of the stomach, small intestines, large intestines, and rectumn. H. pylori is also associated with the development of bile duct cancer and has been associated with a wide range of other diseases although its role in the development of many of these other diseases requires further study. Humans infected with H. felis may also develop some of the same gastrointestinal diseases viz., stomach inflammation, stomach ulcers, duodenal ulcers, stomach cancers that are not lymphomas, and extranodal marginal B cell lymphomas of the stomach. Other non-H. pylori species that are known to be associated with these gastrointestinal diseases are Helicobacter bizzozeronii, Helicobacter salomonis, Helicobacter suis, and Helicobacter heilmannii s.s. Because of their disease associations, these four Helicobacter species plus H. felis are often group together and termed Helicobacter heilmannii sensu lato.

H. felis bacteria are detected in the stomachs of their natural hosts - cats, dogs, rabbits, and cheetahs. Reports suggest that individuals, including children, are infected with this bacterium by having close contact with one of these infected animals: H. heilmanni s.l.-associated diseases, including those associated with H. felis, appear to be zoonotic diseases, i.e. infectious diseases that are caused by pathogen that spread from animals to humans. It is important to diagnose H. felis and other H. heilmannii sensu lato infections in patients with the cited upper gastrointestinal tract diseases, including in particular extranodal marginal zone lymphoma of the stomach, because some of them have been successfully treated and cured using antibiotic-based drug regimens (e.g.amoxicillin, clarithromycin, plus a proton pump inhibitor or metronidazole, clarithromycin, plus a proton pump inhibitor) directed against the instigating bacterium.
