= Chronic diseases and cancers linked to infectious microbes =

Many chronic diseases and cancers are associated with infectious microbes. By this it is meant that the associated microbe is found in the tissues of patients with the disease more frequently than in the bodies of healthy people. When a microbe such as a virus, bacterium, fungus, protozoan or archaeon has been linked to a disease, researchers may start to investigate whether that microbe might be the underlying cause of the disease, or might play a causal role in the illness in conjunction with other causal factors.

== Other causal factors in chronic diseases and cancers ==
Other potential causal factors that may play a role in precipitating chronic diseases and cancers are: environmental toxins, radiations, genetics, epigenetics, events during pregnancy, stress, diet, and lifestyle factors. Chronic diseases and cancers are generally assumed to be multifactorial, meaning that the disease is only precipitated when multiple factors are present. For example: in a murine model of Crohn's disease, this illness can be precipitated by a norovirus, but only when a specific gene variant is present, along with a certain toxin which damages the gut.

== Economic costs of chronic diseases ==
In the USA, 90% of the $4.9 trillion annual healthcare budget goes on chronic diseases and mental illnesses.

== List of chronic diseases and cancers associated with infectious microbes ==
The list below includes some of the more common chronic diseases and cancers that have been associated with infectious microbes.

| Disease | Microbes Linked to the Disease |
|---|---|
| Alzheimer's disease | Alzheimer's disease is associated with the bacteria Porphyromonas gingivalis, Chlamydia pneumoniae, Helicobacter pylori and Fusobacterium nucleatum. Alzheimer's is associated with the protozoan parasite Toxoplasma gondii. Alzheimer's is associated with herpes simplex virus 1 in individuals who possess the APOE-4 form of the APOE gene (APOE-4 enables the virus to enter the brain). Alzheimer's has been linked to cytomegalovirus infection of the brain, which may enter the brain by travelling along the vagus nerve. The viruses HHV-6A and HHV-7 have been found more frequently in the brains of Alzheimer's patients than those of healthy controls. Fungal infections have been found in the brains of Alzheimer patients. |
| Amyotrophic lateral sclerosis | Amyotrophic lateral sclerosis, the most common of five forms of motor neuron disease, is associated with echovirus, an enterovirus infection of the central nervous system, and with retrovirus activity (it is not known whether this retrovirus activity arises from a human endogenous retrovirus, or from an exogenous retrovirus). |
| Anorexia nervosa | Infection with borrelia species bacteria is associated with anorexia nervosa. In rare cases, anorexia nervosa may arise after infection with Streptococcus species bacteria. Adolescent girls who had hospital-treated infections, or had less severe infections treated with anti-infective agents, were found to be at increased risk of developing anorexia nervosa, bulimia nervosa and other eating disorders. Anorexia (the symptom of appetite loss, which is distinct from anorexia nervosa) is associated with the protozoan parasite dientamoeba fragilis. |
| Anxiety disorder | Anxiety is associated with cytomegalovirus, and the bacterium Helicobacter pylori. Anxiety is associated with Toxoplasma gondii, and associated with higher levels of IgG antibodies to this parasite. Anxiety as a personality trait is associated with higher antibody titers to Epstein-Barr virus. Individuals with more attachment anxiety had higher EBV VCA IgG antibody titers. |
| Asthma | Asthma is associated with rhinovirus, human respiratory syncytial virus, and the bacterium Chlamydia pneumoniae. Chlamydia pneumoniae is particularly associated with adult-onset asthma. |
| Atherosclerosis | Atherosclerosis is associated with cytomegalovirus. Atherosclerosis is linked to the bacteria Helicobacter pylori and Chlamydia pneumoniae. |
| Attention deficit hyperactivity disorder | Attention deficit hyperactivity disorder (ADHD) and learning disabilities are associated with the bacteria Borrelia burgdorferi and Streptococcus, and with the viruses HIV and enterovirus 71. Viral infections during pregnancy, at birth and in early childhood are risk factors for ADHD. |
| Autism | Autism is linked to congenital infection with rubella virus or cytomegalovirus. Clostridia bacterial species are associated with autism (these bacteria are present in greater numbers in the guts of autistic children). |
| Autoimmune diseases | Autoimmune diseases are strongly associated with enteroviruses such as Coxsackie B virus. Autoimmune diseases are also associated with Epstein-Barr virus, cytomegalovirus, parvovirus B19, and HIV. Autoimmune diseases are linked to the bacterium Mycobacterium tuberculosis. Autoimmune thyroid disease is associated with Epstein-Barr virus, and Helicobacter pylori. |
| Bipolar disorder | Bipolar disorder is associated with Borna disease virus, and with Borrelia species bacteria. Bipolar has been linked to Toxoplasma gondii and cytomegalovirus. The level of cognitive impairment in bipolar disorder is associated with herpes simplex virus 1. |
| Cancer | Some estimates currently attribute 15% to 20% of all cancers to microbial causes. In future, this percentage may be revised upwards if the microbes currently associated with cancers (such as those listed below) are proven to actually cause those cancers. (For the sake of completeness, some microbes proven to cause cancers are included in the list, in addition to microbes that have been linked to cancers, but are not yet proven to cause the cancer.): Adrenal tumor is associated with BK virus and simian virus 40.; Anal cancer is associated with human papillomaviruses (HPV).; Bladder cancer can be caused by Schistosoma helminths, and BK virus.; Brain tumor. Glioblastoma multiforme is associated with cytomegalovirus, BK virus, JC virus, and simian virus 40.; Breast cancer is associated with bovine leukemia virus, mouse mammary tumor virus, Epstein-Barr virus, and human papillomaviruses (HPV).; Carcinoid tumors are associated with enterovirus infections.; Cervical cancer can be caused by HPV.; Colorectal cancer is associated with the bacteria Helicobacter pylori, Streptococcus bovis and Fusobacterium nucleatum, with HPV, and with the helminth Schistosoma japonicum. JC virus may be a risk factor for colorectal cancer.; Gallbladder cancer is associated with the bacterium Salmonella typhi.; Hodgkin's lymphoma is associated with Epstein-Barr virus, hepatitis C virus, and HIV.; Kaposi's Sarcoma can be caused by Kaposi's sarcoma herpesvirus and HIV.; Liver cancer. Hepatocellular carcinoma can be caused by hepatitis B virus, hepatitis C virus, and by the helminth Schistosoma japonicum.; Lung cancer is associated with the bacterium Chlamydia pneumoniae, with HPV, and with Merkel cell polyomavirus.; Leukemia. Adult T-cell leukemia can be caused by human T-cell leukemia virus-1.; Mesothelioma is associated with simian virus 40, especially in conjunction with asbestos exposure.; Multiple myeloma is associated with hepatitis B virus and hepatitis C virus.; Nasopharyngeal carcinoma can be caused by Epstein-Barr virus.; Non-Hodgkin lymphoma is associated with HIV and simian virus 40.; Oropharyngeal cancer can be caused by HPV.; Ovarian cancer is associated with mumps virus.; Pancreatic cancer is associated with hepatitis B virus, and the bacterium Helicobacter pylori.; Prostate cancer is associated with BK virus, and HPV.; Skin neoplasm (skin tumor or cancer) is associated with HPV.; Squamous cell carcinoma is associated with HPV.; Stomach cancer is associated with the bacterium Helicobacter pylori.; Thyroid cancer is associated with simian virus 40. |
| Chronic fatigue syndrome | Myalgic encephalomyelitis / chronic fatigue syndrome (ME/CFS) is primarily associated with two enteroviruses, namely Coxsackie B virus and echovirus; with three herpesviruses, namely Epstein-Barr virus, cytomegalovirus and human herpesvirus 6; and with SARS-CoV-2. More rarely, ME/CFS may involve chronic infections with the following viruses, bacteria and protozoa: varicella zoster virus, parvovirus B19, Chlamydia pneumoniae, HHV-7, Coxiella burnetii, Giardia lamblia, Ross River virus and West Nile virus. |
| Chronic myocarditis | Chronic myocarditis is associated with the enterovirus Coxsackie B virus. |
| Chronic obstructive pulmonary disease | Chronic obstructive pulmonary disease (COPD), which includes both chronic bronchitis and emphysema, is associated with Chlamydia pneumoniae and Epstein-Barr virus. |
| Crohn's disease | Crohn's disease is linked to a thin layer of infection on the intestinal lining with the fungus Candida tropicalis, in tandem with the bacteria Escherichia coli and Serratia marcescens. Crohn's disease development has been linked to commensal yeast Candida albicans. One study found ileocecal Crohn's disease is associated with viral species from the enterovirus genus (but note that all the study cohort with ileocecal Crohn's disease had disease-associated mutations in either their NOD2 or ATG16L1 genes). Crohn's disease is associated with Mycobacterium avium subspecies paratuberculosis. In a mouse model, Crohn's disease is precipitated by the norovirus CR6 strain, but only in combination with a variant of the Crohn's susceptibility gene ATG16L1, and chemical toxic damage to the gut. In other words, in this mouse model, Crohn's is precipitated only when all three causal factors (virus, gene, and toxin) act in combination. |
| Coronary heart disease | Coronary heart disease is associated with herpes simplex virus 1 and the bacterium Chlamydia pneumoniae. Coronary heart disease is linked to cytomegalovirus. |
| Dementia | Dementia is associated with herpes simplex virus type 1, herpes simplex virus type 2, cytomegalovirus, West Nile virus, Borna disease virus, and HIV. Dementia is also associated with the helminth Taenia solium (pork tapeworm), and with Borrelia species bacteria. |
| Depression | Depression is associated with cytomegalovirus, Borna disease virus, West Nile virus, the parasite Toxoplasma gondii, and the bacterial species Bartonella and Borrelia. Depression in children and adolescents is linked to prior acute enterovirus infection of the central nervous system. It is thought that depression may be precipitated by the effect of immune signals (such as pro-inflammatory cytokines) reaching the brain from infections located in the peripheries of the body. Seasonal affective disorder (winter depression) is associated with Epstein-Barr virus. |
| Diabetes mellitus type 1 | Type 1 diabetes is associated with viral species from the enterovirus genus, such as echovirus 4, echovirus 16, and coxsackie B4 virus. Coxsackie B virus can infect and destroy the insulin-producing beta cells in the pancreas, and also damage these cells via indirect autoimmune mechanisms. Coxsackie B1 virus is associated with a higher risk of the beta cell autoimmunity that portends type 1 diabetes, whereas Coxsackie B3 and B6 viruses is associated with a reduced risk of such autoimmunity (possibly due to immune cross-protection against Coxsackie B1 virus). In boys, human parechovirus infection has been linked to a subsequent appearance of diabetes-associated autoantibodies. Like enterovirus, parechovirus is a genus in the picornavirus family. |
| Diabetes mellitus type 2 | Type 2 diabetes is associated with cytomegalovirus, hepatitis C virus, enteroviruses and ljungan virus. In rabbits, exposure to toxic shock syndrome toxin-1 from a Staphylococcus aureus infection leads to impaired glucose tolerance, the hallmark of type 2 diabetes in humans. |
| Dilated cardiomyopathy | Dilated cardiomyopathy is associated with enteroviruses such as Coxsackie B virus. |
| Epilepsy | Mesial temporal lobe epilepsy is associated with human herpesvirus 6 virus variant B (HHV-6B) infection of the astrocyte cells of the brain. Epilepsy is associated with HPV infection of the brain. |
| Guillain-Barré syndrome | Guillain-Barré syndrome is associated with the bacterium Campylobacter jejuni, and with the viruses cytomegalovirus and enterovirus. |
| Hypertension | Hypertension (high blood pressure) is associated with enteroviruses such as coxsackievirus B5 and echovirus. |
| Infertility | Infertility is linked to an endometrium infection with human herpesvirus 6 virus variant A (HHV-6A). |
| Interstitial cystitis | The ulcerative form of interstitial cystitis is associated with an infection of the bladder tissues with polyomaviruses, and in particular BK virus. Interstitial cystitis is associated with an infection of the bladder tissues with Epstein-Barr virus, and treatment with the EBV antiviral valacyclovir results in clinical improvement in symptoms. |
| Irritable bowel syndrome | Irritable bowel syndrome (IBS) is associated with the bacteria Escherichia coli and Mycobacterium avium subspecies paratuberculosis. IBS is linked to protozoan parasite Giardia lamblia, and pathogenic strains of the protozoan parasite Blastocystis hominis. IBS in those with HIV is associated with the protozoan Dientamoeba fragilis. |
| Lower back pain | Lower back pain is associated with a spinal disc infection with anaerobic bacteria, especially the bacterium Propionibacterium acnes. |
| Lupus | Systemic lupus erythematosus is associated with the viruses parvovirus B19, Epstein-Barr virus, cytomegalovirus and torque teno virus. |
| Macular degeneration | Neovascular (wet) macular degeneration is associated with high cytomegalovirus antibody titers. |
| Metabolic syndrome | Metabolic syndrome is associated with the bacteria Chlamydia pneumoniae and Helicobacter pylori. It is also linked to the viruses cytomegalovirus and herpes simplex virus 1. |
| Multiple sclerosis | Multiple sclerosis is associated with Epstein-Barr virus and strongly associated with certain genetic variants of this virus. One study found EBV in the brain tissues of most ME patients. A landmark 2022 longitudinal study provided strong evidence that EBV is the leading cause of multiple sclerosis. Multiple sclerosis is also linked to human herpesvirus 6, human herpesvirus 6 variant A, varicella zoster virus, and the bacterium Chlamydia pneumoniae. Epsilon toxin from the bacterium Clostridium perfringen may be a triggering factor for MS. |
| Myocardial infarction | Myocardial infarction (heart attack) is associated with Chlamydia pneumoniae, cytomegalovirus and Coxsackie B virus (an enterovirus). Coxsackie B virus and enterovirus are associated with sudden unexpected death due to myocarditis. An autopsy study found 40% of those who died of a sudden heart attack had enterovirus markers in their endomyocardial tissues, compared to 8% in controls. |
| Myopia | Myopia (short-sightedness) is associated with childhood febrile illnesses of measles, rubella, pertussis (whooping cough) and mumps. |
| Obesity | Obesity is associated with adenovirus 36, which is found in 30% of obese people, but only in 11% of non-obese people. It has further been demonstrated that animals experimentally infected with adenovirus 36, adenovirus 5 or adenovirus 37 will develop increased obesity. It is known that adenovirus 36 causes a proliferation of fat cells (adipocytes). Evidence suggests that obesity may be a viral disease, and that the worldwide obesity epidemic that began in the 1980s may be in part due to viral infection. Obesity is associated with higher gut levels of certain Firmicutes bacteria in relation to Bacteroidetes bacteria. Overweight individuals tend have more Firmicutes bacteria (such as Clostridium, Staphylococcus, Streptococcus, and Helicobacter pylori) in their gut, whereas normal weight individuals tend have more Bacteroidetes bacteria. |
| Obsessive-compulsive disorder | Obsessive-compulsive disorder (OCD) is associated with Streptococcus and Borrelia species bacteria. |
| Panic disorder | Panic disorder is associated with Borrelia and Bartonella species bacteria. |
| Parkinson's disease | Parkinson's disease is associated with enterovirus, Ljungan virus (from the picornavirus family), and influenza A virus. Human pegivirus is found in the brains of 50% of Parkinson's patients, but is not found in the brains of controls. Parkinson's is linked to the protozoan parasite Toxoplasma gondii. Parkinson's disease is linked to Streptococcus mutans in the gut; these bacteria produce imidazole propionate which is toxic to dopamine neurons. |
| Psoriasis | Psoriasis is associated with a Helicobacter pylori trigger. |
| Rheumatoid arthritis | Rheumatoid arthritis is linked to the bacteria Porphyromonas gingivalis and Proteus mirabilis. Rheumatoid arthritis is associated with parvovirus B19. Antibodies to Borrelia outer surface protein A are associated with rheumatoid arthritis. |
| Sarcoidosis | Sarcoidosis is associated with Mycobacteria species and the bacterium Helicobacter pylori. |
| Schizophrenia | Schizophrenia is associated with Borna disease virus. Schizophrenia is linked to the parasite Toxoplasma gondii. Schizophrenia is linked to the bacteria Chlamydia trachomatis, Borrelia, and Bartonella henselae (the cause of cat scratch disease). Schizophrenia is linked to an aberrant immune response to Epstein-Barr virus. One study found that a central nervous system infection as a child (particularly with coxsackievirus B5) increases the risk of developing schizophrenia as an adult by nearly 5-fold. A large study found influenza virus infection during the first trimester of pregnancy increases the risk that the baby will get schizophrenia later in life by 7-fold; there was no increased risk if the mother caught influenza during the second or third trimesters. Individuals experiencing acute psychosis are nearly 11 times more likely to have a urinary tract infection. |
| Sjögren's syndrome | Primary Sjögren's syndrome is associated with the enterovirus Coxsackie B4 virus. |
| Stroke | Persistent enterovirus infection (Coxsackie B virus or echovirus) is linked to the development of acute stroke. Stroke is associated with the bacteria Chlamydia pneumoniae, Helicobacter pylori, Mycobacterium tuberculosis, and Mycoplasma pneumoniae. Stroke is linked to varicella zoster virus and the fungus Histoplasma. |
| Tourette syndrome | Tourette's is associated with the bacterium Streptococcus. Aggravating or contributory microbes in Tourette's may include the bacteria Mycoplasma pneumoniae, Chlamydia pneumoniae, Chlamydia trachomatis, and the protozoan parasite Toxoplasma gondii. |
| Valvular heart disease | Heart valve disease is linked to enterovirus and coxsackievirus B infection of the heart valve tissues. |
| Vasculitis | Vasculitis is associated with HIV, parvovirus B19, and hepatitis B virus. The hepatitis C virus is an established and proven cause of vasculitis. |

== See also ==
- Infectious causes of cancer
- List of oncogenic bacteria
- Carcinogenic bacteria
- Oncovirus
- List of infectious diseases
