= Infectious causes of cancer =

Pathogens as a cause of cancer

Share of new cancers caused by all known infectious agents

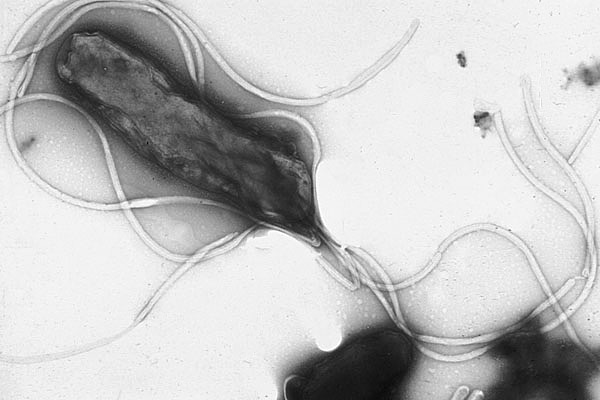
Helicobacter pylori

Estimates place the worldwide risk of cancers from infectious causes at 16%. Viral infections are risk factors for cervical cancer, 80% of liver cancers, and 15–20% of the other cancers. This proportion varies in different regions of the world from a high of 32.7% in Sub-Saharan Africa to 3.3% in Australia and New Zealand.

A virus that can cause cancer is called an oncovirus or tumor virus. These include the human papillomavirus, which is associated with cervical carcinoma and nasopharyngeal carcinoma; Epstein-Barr virus, which is associated with a variety of Epstein-Barr virus-associated lymphoproliferative lymphomas; Kaposi's sarcoma herpesvirus, which is associated with Kaposi's sarcoma and primary effusion lymphoma; hepatitis B and hepatitis C viruses which are associated with hepatocellular carcinoma; and human T-cell leukemia virus-1 which is associated with adult T-cell leukemia/lymphoma. Bacterial infection may also increase the risk of cancer, as seen in Helicobacter pylori-induced stomach cancer. Parasitic infections strongly associated with cancer include Schistosoma haematobium (squamous cell carcinoma of the bladder) and the liver flukes, Opisthorchis viverrini and Clonorchis sinensis (cholangiocarcinoma).

== Developed world ==
Infection is the fourth most important risk factor for cancer mortality in the developed world, causing about 10% of cancer mortality (see cancer prevention), coming after tobacco (~30% of cancers), diet (~30%) and obesity (~15%). Cancer causes 22.5% of deaths in the United States, so that about 2% of mortality in the United States appears to be due to cancers caused by infections. This is comparable to mortality caused by influenza and pneumonia, which cause 2.1% of deaths in the United States.

== By cancer type ==
Worldwide in 2015, the most common causes of cancer death were lung cancer (1.6 million deaths), liver cancer (745,000 deaths), and stomach cancer (723,000 deaths). Lung cancer is largely due to non-infectious causes, such as tobacco smoke, air pollution (be it indoor or environmental), asbestos and Radon. However, liver and stomach cancer are primarily due to infectious causes. Liver cancer is largely caused by infectious hepatitis B virus (HBV) plus hepatitis C virus (HBC) and stomach cancer is largely caused by Helicobacter pylori bacteria. World-wide, the estimated number of people chronically infected with HBV and/or HCV is ~325 million. Over half of the world's population is colonized with H. pylori and it is estimated that H. pylori-positive patients have a 1-2% risk of developing distal gastric cancer.

== Genome instability due to oncogenic infections ==
Genomic instability through various means such as DNA damage and epigenetic modifications appear to be the basic causes of sporadic (non-familial) cancer. While infections have many effects, infectious organisms that increase the risk of cancer are frequently a source of DNA damage or genomic instability, as discussed below for oncogenic viruses and an oncogenic bacterium.

== Viruses ==
Viruses are one of the most important risk factors for cancer development in humans.

Infection by some hepatitis viruses, especially hepatitis B and hepatitis C, can induce a long-term viral infection that leads to liver cancer in about 1 in 200 of people infected with hepatitis B each year (more in Asia, fewer in North America), and in about 1 in 45 of people infected with hepatitis C each year. People with chronic hepatitis B infection are more than 200 times more likely to develop liver cancer than uninfected people. Liver cirrhosis, whether from chronic viral hepatitis infection or excessive alcohol use or some other cause, is independently associated with the development of liver cancer, and the combination of cirrhosis and viral hepatitis presents the highest risk of liver cancer development. Because chronic viral hepatitis is so common, and liver cancer so deadly, liver cancer is one of the most common causes of cancer-related deaths in the world, and is especially common in East Asia and parts of sub-Saharan Africa.

Human papillomaviruses (HPV) also cause many cancers. HPV is well known for causing genital warts and essentially all cases of cervical cancer, but it can also infect and cause cancer in several other parts of the body, including the esophagus larynx, lining of the mouth, nose, and throat, anus, vulva, vagina, and penis. The Papanicolaou smear ("Pap" smear) is a widely used cancer screening test for cervical cancer. DNA-based tests to identify the virus are also available.

Herpesviruses are a third group of common cancer-causing viruses. Two types of herpesviruses have been associated with cancer: the Epstein–Barr virus (EBV) and human herpesvirus 8 (HHV-8). EBV appears to cause all nonkeratinizing nasopharyngeal carcinomas, Epstein–Barr virus-positive diffuse large B-cell lymphomas, not otherwise specified, diffuse large B-cell lymphomas associated with chronic inflammation, Epstein–Barr virus-positive mucocutaneous ulcers, Lymphomatoid granulomatoses and, in many cases, fibrin-associated diffuse large B-cell lymphoma and intravascular NK/T cell lymphomas. It also appears to cause some cases of lymphoma, including Burkitt's lymphoma (this causal association is especially strong in Africa) and Hodgkin's disease, EBV has been found in a variety of other types of cancer cells, although its role in causing these other cancers is not well established. KSHV/HHV-8 causes all cases of Kaposi's sarcoma, and has been found in some cases of a cancer-related condition called Castleman's disease. Studies involving other kinds of cancer, particularly prostate cancer, have been inconsistent. Both of these herpesviruses are commonly found in cancerous cells of primary effusion lymphoma. Herpesviruses also cause cancer in animals, especially leukemias and lymphomas.

Human T cell lymphotropic virus (HTLV-1) was the first human retrovirus discovered by Robert Gallo and colleagues at NIH. The virus causes Adult T-cell leukemia, a disease first described by Takatsuki and colleagues in Japan and other neurological diseases. Closely related to human T-cell leukemia virus, is another deltaretrovirus, bovine leukemia virus (BLV), which recently has met the expected criteria to accept a possible infectious agent causation of breast cancer, using sensitive PCR methods to detect BLV, and having samples from women with breast cancer compared to a control sample of women with no history of breast cancer.

Merkel cell polyomavirus is the most recently discovered human cancer virus, isolated from Merkel cell carcinoma tissues in 2008, by the same group that discovered KSHV/HHV-8 in 1994, using a new technology called digital transcriptome subtraction. About 80% of Merkel cell carcinomas are caused by Merkel cell polyomavirus; the remaining tumors have an unknown etiology and possibly a separate histogenesis. This is the only member of this group of viruses known to cause human cancer but other polyomaviruses are suspects for being additional cancer viruses.

HIV does not directly cause cancer, but it is associated with a number of malignancies, especially Kaposi's sarcoma, non-Hodgkin's lymphoma, anal cancer and cervical cancer. Kaposi's sarcoma is caused by human herpesvirus 8. AIDS-related cases of anal cancer and cervical cancer are commonly caused by human papillomavirus. After HIV destroys the immune system, the body is no longer able to control these viruses, and the infections manifest as cancer. Certain other immune deficiency states (e.g. common variable immunodeficiency and IgA deficiency) are also associated with increased risk of malignancy.

In Western developed countries, human papillomavirus (HPV), hepatitis B virus (HBV) and hepatitis C virus (HCV) are the most frequently encountered oncogenic DNA viruses.

=== Human papillomavirus ===
Worldwide, HPV causes the second largest fraction of infection-associated cancers or 5.2% of the global cancer burden.

In the United States, HPV causes most cervical cancers, as well as some cancers of the vagina, vulva, penis, anus, rectum, and oropharynx (cancers of the back of the throat, including the base of the tongue and tonsils). Each year in the United States, about 39,800 new cases of cancer are found in parts of the body where HPV is often found. HPV causes about 31,500 of these cancers.

As reviewed by Münger et al. there are about 200 HPVs. They can be classified into mucosal and cutaneous HPVs. Within each of these HPV groups, individual viruses are designated high risk or low risk according to the propensity for malignant progression of the lesions that they cause. Among the HPV high-risk viruses, the HPV E6 and E7 oncoproteins functionally inactivate the p53 and retinoblastoma tumor suppressors respectively. In addition, the high-risk HPV E6 and E7 oncoproteins can each independently induce genomic instability in normal human cells. They generate mitotic defects and aneuploidy through the induction of centrosome abnormalities.

=== Hepatitis B and hepatitis C ===
Hepatitis virus-associated hepatocarcinogenesis is a serious health concern. Liver cancer in the United States is primarily due to three main factors: hepatitis C virus (HCV) (22%), hepatitis B virus (HBV) (12%) and alcohol use (47%). In 2017 there will be about 40,710 new cases of liver cancer in the United States. World-wide, liver cancer mortality is more often due to hepatitis B virus (HBV) (33%), less often due to hepatitis C virus (HCV) (21%), and still frequently due to alcohol use (30%). World-wide, liver cancer is the 4th most frequent cause of cancer mortality, causing 9% of all cancer mortality (total liver cancer deaths in 2015 being 810,500), and coming, in frequency, after lung, colorectal and stomach cancers.

As reviewed by Takeda et al., HCV and HBV cause carcinogenic DNA damage and genomic instability by a number of mechanisms. HBV, and especially HCV, cause chronic inflammation in the liver, increasing reactive oxygen species (ROS) formation. ROS interact directly with DNA, causing multiple types of DNA damages (26 ROS-induced DNA damages are described by Yu et al.) It also appears that chronic inflammation caused by HCV infection triggers the aberrant up-regulation of activation-induced cytidine deaminase (AID) in hepatocytes. AID creates mutations in DNA by deamination (a DNA damage) of the cytosine base, which converts cytosine into uracil. Thus, it changes a C:G base pair into a mutagenic U:G mismatch. In a still further cause of DNA damage, HCV core protein binds to the NBS1 protein and inhibits the formation of the Mre11/NBS1/Rad50 complex, thereby inhibiting DNA binding of repair enzymes. As a result of reduced DNA repair mutagenic DNA damages can accumulate.

== Bacteria ==
=== H. pylori ===
In addition to viruses, certain kinds of bacteria can cause some cancers. The most prominent example is the link between chronic infection of the wall of the stomach with Helicobacter pylori and gastric cancer.

Although the data varies between different countries, overall about 1% to 3% of people infected with Helicobacter pylori develop gastric cancer in their lifetime compared to 0.13% of individuals who have no H. pylori infection. Due to the prevalence of infection by H. pylori in middle-aged adults (74% in developing countries and 58% in developed countries in 2002), and 1% to 3% likelihood of infected individuals developing gastric cancer, H. pylori-induced gastric cancer is the third highest cause of worldwide cancer mortality as of 2018.

The mechanism by which H. pylori causes cancer may involve chronic inflammation, or the direct action of some of its virulence factors, for example, CagA has been implicated in carcinogenesis.

As reviewed by Chang and Parsonnet, chronic H. pylori infection in the human stomach is characterized by chronic inflammation. This is accompanied by epithelial cell release of reactive oxygen species (ROS) and reactive nitrogen species (RNOS), followed by the assembly of activated macrophages at the stomach site of infection. The macrophages also release ROS and RNOS. Levels of 8-oxo-2'-deoxyguanosine (8-OHdG), one of the predominant forms of free radical-induced oxidative DNA damages, are increased more than 8-fold in DNA after infection by H. pylori, especially if the H. pylori are cagA positive. The increase in 8-OHdG likely increases mutation. In addition, oxidative stress, with high levels of 8-OHdG in DNA, also affects genome stability by altering chromatin status. Such alterations can lead to abnormal methylation of promoters of tumor suppressor genes.

In addition to mutations caused by the direct damage to DNA by H. pylori-induced ROS, H. pylori-induced carcinogenic mutations and protein expression alterations are very often a result of H. pylori-induced epigenetic alterations. These epigenetic alterations include H. pylori-induced methylation of CpG sites in promoters of genes and H. pylori-induced altered expression of multiple microRNAs.

As reviewed by Santos and Ribeiro H. pylori infection is associated with epigenetically reduced efficiency of the DNA repair machinery, which favors the accumulation of mutations and genomic instability as well as gastric carcinogenesis. In particular, as reviewed by Raza et al., human gastric infection with H. pylori causes epigenetically reduced protein expression of DNA repair proteins MLH1, MGMT and MRE11. In addition, Raza et al. showed that two further DNA repair proteins, ERCC1 and PMS2 had epigenetically severely reduced protein expression once H. pylori infection had progressed to cause dyspepsia (which occurs in 20% of infected individuals).

=== Mycobacterium ===
Tuberculosis is a risk factor for lung cancer.

=== E. Coli ===
Colibactin is a genotoxin produced by Escherichia coli infection that can cause colorectal cancer to develop.

=== Other bacteria ===
One meta-analysis of serological data comparing prior Chlamydia pneumoniae infection in patients with and without lung cancer found results suggesting prior infection was associated with a slightly increased risk of developing lung cancer.

== Parasites ==
The parasites that cause schistosomiasis (bilharzia), especially S. haematobium, can cause bladder cancer and cancer at other sites. Inflammation triggered by the worm's eggs appears to be the mechanism by which squamous cell carcinoma of the bladder is caused. In Asia, infection by S. japonicum is associated with colorectal cancer.

Distomiasis, caused by parasitic liver flukes, is associated with cholangiocarcinoma (cancer of the bile duct) in East Asia.

Malaria is associated with Burkitt's lymphoma in Africa, especially when present in combination with Epstein-Barr virus, although it is unclear whether it is causative.

Parasites are also a significant cause of cancer in animals. Cysticercus fasciolaris, the larval form of the common tapeworm of the cat, Taenia taeniaformis, causes cancer in rats. Spirocerca lupi is associated with esophageal cancer in dogs, at least within the southern United States.

A novel type of case, reported in 2015, involved an immunocompromised man whose tapeworm underwent malignant transformation, causing metastasis of tapeworm cell neoplasia throughout his body. This was not a cancer of his own cells but of the parasite's. This isolated case has no substantive bearing on public health but is interesting for being "a novel disease mechanism that links infection and cancer."

== See also ==
- Barry Marshall
- Clonally transmissible cancer
- Harald zur Hausen
- Helicobacter pylori eradication protocols
- J. Robin Warren
- Chronic diseases and cancers linked to infectious microbes
- List of oncogenic bacteria
- List of infectious diseases
- Francis Peyton Rous
