= Helicobacter bizzozeronii =

Scientific classification
- Domain: Bacteria
- Kingdom: Pseudomonadati
- Phylum: Campylobacterota
- Class: "Campylobacteria"
- Order: Campylobacterales
- Family: Helicobacteraceae
- Genus: Helicobacter
- Species: H. bizzozeronii

Binomial name
- Helicobacter bizzozeronii Paster et al., 1991

Species of bacterium

Helicobacter bizzozeronii is a species within the Helicobacter genus of Gram-negative bacteria. Helicobacter pylori is by far the best known Helicobacter species, primarily because humans infected with it may develop gastrointestinal tract diseases such as stomach inflammation, stomach ulcers, duodenal ulcers, stomach cancers of the nonlymphoma type, and various subtypes of extranodal marginal zone lymphomas e.g. those of the stomach, small intestines, large intestines, and rectumn. H. pylori is also associated with the development of bile duct cancer and has been associated with a wide range of other diseases although its role in the development of many of these other diseases requires further study. Humans infected with H. bizzozeronii are prone to develop some of the same gastrointestinal diseases viz., stomach inflammation, stomach ulcers, duodenal ulcers, stomach cancers that are not lymphomas, and extranodal marginal B cell lymphomas of the stomach. Other non-H. pylori Helicobacter species that are known to be associated with these gastrointestinal diseases are Helicobacter felis, Helicobacter salomonis, Helicobacter suis, and Helicobacter heilmannii s.s. Because of their disease associations, these four Helicobacter species plus H. bizzozeronii are often grouped together and termed Helicobacter heilmannii sensu lato.

Helicobacter bizzozeronii bacteria are detected in the stomachs of their natural hosts - cats, dogs, foxes, and lynxes, as well as in the saliva of dogs. Reports suggest that individuals, including children, are infected with this bacterium by having close contact with these animals. That is, H. bizzozeronii-associated diseases appear to be zoonotic diseases, i.e. infectious diseases that are caused by pathogen that spread from animals to humans. It is important to diagnose H. bizzozeronii and the other H. heilmannii sensu lato infections in patients with the cited upper gastrointestinal tract diseases, including in particular extranodal marginal zone lymphoma of the stomach, because some of them have been successfully treated and cured using antibiotic-based drug regimens (e.g.amoxicillin, clarithromycin, plus a proton pump inhibitor or metronidazole, clarithromycin, plus a proton pump inhibitor) directed against the instigating bacterium.
