= Carcinogenic bacteria =

Bacteria known or suspected to cause cancer

Bacteria involved in causing and treating cancers

Cancer bacteria are bacteria infectious organisms that are known or suspected to cause cancer. While cancer-associated bacteria have long been considered to be opportunistic (i.e., infecting healthy tissues after cancer has already established itself), there is some evidence that bacteria may be directly carcinogenic. Evidence has shown that a specific stage in cancer can be associated with bacteria that is pathogenic. The strongest evidence to date involves the bacterium H. pylori and its role in gastric cancer.

Oncoviruses are viral agents that are similarly suspected of causing cancer.

== Known to cause cancer ==
Helicobacter pylori colonizes the human stomach and duodenum. It is described as a Class 1 carcinogen. In some cases it can cause stomach cancer and MALT lymphoma. Animal models have demonstrated Koch's third and fourth postulates for the role of Helicobacter pylori in the causation of stomach cancer. The mechanism by which H. pylori causes cancer may involve chronic inflammation, or the direct action of some of its virulence factors, for example, CagA has been implicated in carcinogenesis. Another bacteria that is in this genus is Helicobacter hepaticus, which causes hepatitis and liver cancer in mice.

=== Chronic inflammation ===
Chronic inflammation contributes to the pathogenesis of several types of malignant diseases, but it is particularly important for H. pylori. Following a H. pylori infection many circulating immune cells are recruited to the infection site including neutrophils. To destroy the pathogens, neutrophils produce substances with antimicrobial activities such as oxidants like reactive oxygen species (ROS) and reactive nitrogen species (RNS). H. pylori can survive the induced oxidative stress by producing antioxidant enzymes such as e.g., catalase. However, the overproduction of ROS and RNS induces various types of DNA damage in the infected gastric cells.At the same time H. pylori is known to down-regulate major DNA repair pathways. As a result, genomic and mitochondrial mutations accumulate, leading to genomic instability - a well-known hallmark of Cancer - in the gastric cells.

=== CagA ===
The virulence factor CagA in H. pylori has been linked to the development of gastric cancer. Once CagA is injected into the cytoplasm it can change the gastric cell signaling in both a phosphorylation-dependent and -independent manner. Phosphorylated CagA affects cell adhesion, spread and migration but can also induce the release of the proinflammatory chemokine IL-8. Additionally, interactions of the CRPIA motif in non-phosphorylated CagA were shown to lead to the persistent activation of the PI3K/Akt pathway, a pathway that is often overly active in many human cancers. This leads to the activation of the pro-inflammatory NF-κB and β-catenin pathways as well as increased gastric cell proliferation. Furthermore, CagA has also been found to increase tumor suppressor gene hypermethylation and thereby inhibiting the tumor suppressor genes. This is achieved by upregulating the methyltransferase DNMT1 via the AKT–NF-κB pathway. Lastly, CagA also induces the expression of the enzyme spermine oxidase (SMOX) that converts spermine to spermidine. As a by-product H_{2}O_{2} is produced which causes ROS accumulation and contributes to the oxidative stress that the gastric cells experience during chronic inflammation.

== Speculative links ==
A number of bacteria have associations with cancer, although their possible role in carcinogenesis is unclear.

Bacteria	Suggested link
Salmonella Typhi, Paratiphi A, Typhimurium	is associated with gallbladder cancer.
Streptococcus bovis	is associated with colorectal cancer.
Chlamydia pneumoniae	is associated with lung cancer.
Mycoplasma	may also have a role in the formation of different types of cancer.
Helicobacter pylori	has been linked with certainty to stomach cancer and may be related to MALT lymphoma, and has also been associated to oral cancer. but may also protect certain individuals from esophageal cancer.
Porphyromonas gingivalis	is associated with esophageal cancer, colorectal cancer, pancreatic cancer.
Fusobacterium nucleatum	is associated with esophageal cancer, colorectal cancer, pancreatic cancer.
Escherichia coli	is associated with colorectal cancer.
Salmonella spp.	is associated with colorectal cancer.
Enterotoxigenic Bacteroides fragilis	is associated with colorectal cancer.
Chlamydia trachomatis in concert with HPV infection	is associated with cervical cancer.
Streptococcus anginosus	is associated with esophageal cancer.
Streptococcus mitis	is associated with esophageal cancer.
Ruminococcus	is associated with colorectal cancer when under aerobic conditions.

Salmonella Typhi has been linked to gallbladder cancer but may also be useful in delivering chemotherapeutic agents for the treatment of melanoma, colon and bladder cancer. Bacteria found in the gut may be related to colon cancer but may be more complicated due to the role of chemoprotective probiotic cancers. Microorganisms and their metabolic byproducts, or impact of chronic inflammation, may also be linked to oral cancers.

The relationship between cancer and bacteria may be complicated by different individuals reacting in different ways to different cancers.

== History ==
In 1890, the Scottish pathologist William Russell reported circumstantial evidence for the bacterial cause of cancer. In 1926, Canadian physician Thomas Glover reported that he could consistently isolate a specific bacterium from the neoplastic tissues of animals and humans. One review summarized Glover's report as follows:

The author reports the isolation of a pleomorphic organism from various types of cancer which can be grown in pure cultures in its several phases. He produced a serum from it which has given remarkable results in a series of 50 reported cases. This is very important, if true. We suppose the Cancer Society will give an opinion later on the reliability of the findings."

Glover was asked to continue his work at the Public Health Service (later incorporated into the National Institutes of Health) completing his studies in 1929 and publishing his findings in 1930. He asserted that a vaccine or anti-serum manufactured from his bacterium could be used to treat cancer patients with varying degrees of success. According to historical accounts, scientists from the Public Health Service challenged Glover's claims and asked him to repeat his research to better establish quality control. Glover refused and opted to continue his research independently; not seeking consensus, Glover's claims and results led to controversy and are today not given serious merit.

In 1950, a Newark-based physician named Virginia Livingston published a paper claiming that a specific Mycobacterium was associated with neoplasia. Livingston continued to research the alleged bacterium throughout the 1950s and eventually proposed the name Progenitor cryptocides as well as developed a treatment protocol. Ultimately, her claim of a universal cancer bacterium was not supported in follow up studies. In 1990 the National Cancer Institute published a review of Livingston's theories, concluding that her methods of classifying the cancer bacterium contained "remarkable errors" and it was actually a case of misclassification - the bacterium was actually Staphylococcus epidermidis.

Other researchers and clinicians who worked with the theory that bacteria could cause cancer, especially from the 1930s to the 1960s, included Eleanor Alexander-Jackson, William Coley, William Crofton, Gunther Enderlein, Franz Gerlach, Josef Issels, Elise L'Esperance, Milbank Johnson, Arthur Kendall, Royal Rife, Florence Seibert, Wilhelm von Brehmer, and Ernest Villequez. Alexander-Jackson and Seibert worked with Virginia Livingston. Some of the researchers published reports that also claimed to have found bacteria associated with different types of cancers.

== See also ==
- List of oncogenic bacteria
- Infectious causes of cancer
- Chronic diseases and cancers linked to infectious microbes
- Oncovirus
- List of infectious diseases
