= Helicobacter heilmannii sensu lato =

Species group of bacteria

- Complications: Infections associated with malignant and nonmalignant stomach diseases
- Treatment: Antibiotic-based drug regimens can cure stomach diseases due to these bacteria.

Helicobacter heilmannii s.l.

Scientific classification
- Domain: Bacteria
- Phylum: Campylobacterota
- Class: "Campylobacteria"
- Order: Campylobacterales
- Family: Helicobacteraceae
- Genus: Helicobacter Goodwin et al. 1989
- Species group: Helicobacter heilmannii s.l.

Helicobacter heilmannii sensu lato refers to a group of bacterial species within the Helicobacter genus. The Helicobacter genus consists of at least 40 species of spiral-shaped (also described as corkscrew-shaped) flagellated, Gram-negative bacteria of which the by far most prominent and well-known species is Helicobacter pylori (H. pylori). H. pylori is associated with the development of gastrointestinal tract diseases such as stomach inflammation, stomach ulcers, duodenal ulcers, stomach cancers that are not lymphomas, and various subtypes of extranodal marginal zone lymphomas, e.g. those of the stomach, small intestines, large intestines, and rectum. H. pylori has also been associated with the development of bile duct cancer and has been associated with a wide range of other diseases although its role in the development of many of these other diseases requires further study.

The H. heilmannii sensu lato species of bacteria take as part of their definition a similarity to H. pylori in being associated with the development of stomach inflammation, stomach ulcers, duodenal ulcers, stomach cancers that are not lymphomas, and extranodal marginal B cell lymphomas of the stomach. It is important to recognize and diagnose the association of H. heilmannii sensu lato with these upper gastrointestinal tract diseases, particularly extranodal marginal zone lymphoma of the stomach, because many of them have been successfully treated using antibiotic-based drug regimens directed against the instigating H. heilmannii sensu lato bacterial species.

== Taxonomy ==
The current taxonomy of Helicobacter bacteria is somewhat complex and incomplete, with new species currently being considered as possibly belonging to this genus. Within the Helicobacter genus, H. heilmannii s. l. is a group of Helicobacter species that are distinguished from H. pylori by being two- to three-fold larger in size (they are 3–6.5 micrometers in length and 0.6-0.7 micrometers in width, while H. pylori is 2.5-5.0 micrometers in length and 0.5-1.0 micrometers in width) as well as in the position and number of their flagella (H. pylori has 4-8 flagella that are located at only one of their ends, while they have 4-10 flagella divided between both of their ends). The Helicobacter heilmannii grouping of bacteria is further divided into two groups: H. heilmannii sensu stricto (H. heilmannii s.s.) and H. heilmannii sensu lato (H. heilmannii s.l.). H. heilmannii s.l. is Helicobacter heilmannii bacterial species that have been isolated from the stomachs of humans and animals, but identified only on the basis of their histopathological appearance, electron microscopic appearance, and/or other crude taxonomic data: in most studies, the species of these H. heilmannii bacteria is not defined other than that they are non-H. pylori isolated from the stomachs of humans and animals. H. heilmanni s.l. is a clinically useful designation indicating unidentified H. pylori species of H. heilmannii that, like H. pylori, can cause upper gastrointestinal tract diseases in humans, and are sensitive to a common set of antibiotic regimens. H. heilmanni s.s., in contrast, is Helicobacter heilmannii isolates whose species have been clearly defined, typically by unambiguous molecular biology methods.

== Epidemiology and transmission to humans ==
Most clinical studies have not identified the exact species of H. heilmannii associated with upper gastrointestinal tract disease and therefore designated these bacterial species as H. heilmanni s.l. However, investigative studies have identified these species in some patients with H. heilmanni s.l.-associated stomach diseases. The H. heilmanni s.s. species identified to date in the stomachs of humans with these upper gastrointestinal tract diseases, the natural hosts for these species, the sites these species colonize in their natural, nonhuman hosts, and each species prevalence as a percentage of all H. heilmannii s.s. species isolated from humans are given in the following table.

H. heilmannii s.s. species identified in the stomachs of patients with H. heilmannii s.l.-associated diseases	Non-human natural hosts	Colonized sites in non-humans hosts	Prevalence in humans
Helicobacter bizzozeronii	cat, dog, fox, lynx	stomach, dog saliva	4%
Helicobacter felis	cat, dog, rabbit, cheetah	stomach	15%
Helicobacter salomonis	cat, dog, rabbit	stomach, dog saliva	21%
Helicobacter suis	pig, nonhuman primates	stomach	14%-37%
Helicobacter heilmannii s.s^{1}	cat dog, fox, lyrnx, nonhuman primates	stomach	8%

1. H. heilmannii s.s. is a species in the H. heilmannii group; the appended "s.s." abbreviation is used to indicate that it refers to a specific species rather than the group.

Many reports suggest that individuals, including children, acquire H. heilmanni s.l. infections by close contact with cats, dogs, pigs, and other farm animals, as well as by eating raw pork contaminated by H. suis. The H. heilmanni s.s. species listed in the above table have been isolated from these animals, while H. suis has been isolated from fresh raw pork (H. suis remains viable up to 72 hours in fresh raw pork). Furthermore, a higher rate of H. heilmanni s.l.-associated infections occurs in rural areas. These findings suggest that the H. heilmanni s.l.-associated diseases are zoonotic diseases, i.e., infectious diseases that are caused by pathogen that spread from animals to humans.

== H. heilmanni s.l.-associated diseases ==
H. heilmanni s.l. has been detected in the stomach of patients with acute and chronic gastritis, peptic ulcer disease of the stomach and duodenum, nonlymphoma types of stomach cancers, and extranodal marginal zone B-cell lymphoma of the stomach. Based on the ability of antibiotic-based drug regimens to improve and cure some of these diseases in humans and animal models, H. heilmanni s.l. infections are considered to be key contributors in their development and/or progression. H. pylori is far more often involved in these diseases: H. heilmanni s.l. is typically associated with <1% of all Helicobacter-induced upper gastrointestinal tract diseases, while H. pylori is associated with the remaining cases. In certain Asian countries, however, H. heilmanni s.l. appears to be associated with higher percentages of upper gastrointestinal tract diseases; for example, it is associated with 4% and 6.2%, respectively, of all Helicobacter-associated diseases in China and Thailand.

== Treatment of H. heilmanni s.l.- associated diseases ==
The treatment of patients with H. heilmanni s.l.-associated diseases has employed the same antibiotic-based drug regiments that have been successfully used to treat and cure H. pylori-associated diseases. These regimens have eradicated the H. heilmanni s.l. bacterium in the stomach to achieve symptomatic relief and total regression of some of the infection-associated nonmalignant, as well as malignant diseases, particularly extranodal marginal B-cell lymphoma. Drug regimens of amoxicillin, clarithromycin, plus a proton pump inhibitor or metronidazole, clarithromycin, plus a proton pump inhibitor have been used to treat S. heilmannii s.l.-associated upper gastrointestinal tract diseases successfully.
