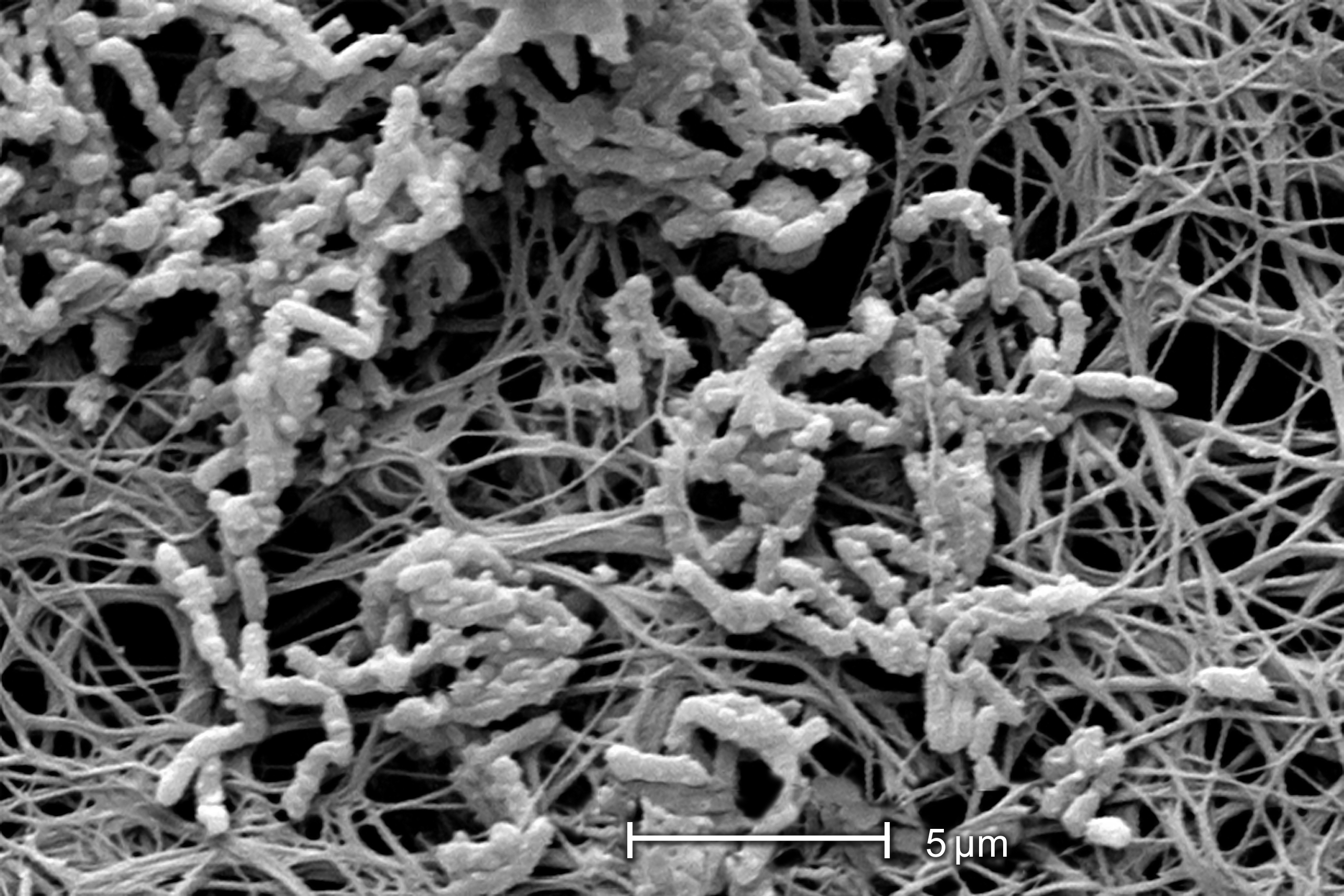

Scientific classification
- Domain: Bacteria
- Kingdom: Pseudomonadati
- Phylum: Pseudomonadota
- Class: Betaproteobacteria
- Order: Burkholderiales
- Family: Alcaligenaceae
- Genus: Achromobacter
- Species: A. xylosoxidans

Binomial name
- Achromobacter xylosoxidans Yabuuchi and Yano 1981

Type strain
- ATCC 27061, BCRC 12839, CCM 2741, CCRC 12839, CCTM La 3521, CCUG 12689, CDC KC 1064, CDCKC1064, CECT 467 = Colección Española de Cultivos, CECT 927, CGMCC 1.2007, CIP 71.32, DSM 10346, DSM 2402, DSMZ 10346, DSMZ 2402, EY 543, GIFL 543, GIFU 543, Hugh 2838, IAM 12684, IFO 15126, IMD 101001, JCM 9659, KACC 10205, KM 543, LMG 1863, NBRC 15126, NCIB 12033, NCIMB 12033, NCTC 1 O807, NCTC 10807, NRRL 84082, NRRL B-4082, NXRX 10807, PCM 2222, R-16924, R. Hugh 2838, R.Hugh 2838, RH 2838, RIMD 101001, strain KM 543, strain Takeda, VTT E-991282 Yabuuchi KM 543

= Achromobacter xylosoxidans =

Species of bacterium

Achromobacter xylosoxidans (formerly Alcaligenes xylosoxidans) is a Gram-negative, aerobic, oxidase and catalase-positive, motile bacterium with peritrichous flagella, from the genus Achromobacter. It is generally found in wet environments. Achromobacter xylosoxidans can cause infections such as bacteremia, especially in patients with cystic fibrosis. In 2013, the complete genome of an A. xylosoxidans strain from a patient with cystic fibrosis was sequenced.

== Bacteriology ==
A. xylosoxidans is a Gram-negative rod that does not form spores. It is motile, with peritrichous flagella that distinguish it from Pseudomonas species, and is oxidase-positive, catalase-positive, and citrate-positive. It is urease and indole-negative. It produces acid oxidatively from xylose, but not from lactose, maltose, mannitol, or sucrose. It grows well on MacConkey agar and other inhibitory growth media such as deoxycholate, Salmonella-Shigella, and nalidixic acid-cetrimide agars.

It is usually resistant to a variety of antibiotics including penicillins, cephalosporins, quinolones, and aminoglycosides. Ampicillin and carbenicillin, which are penicillins, are an exception. It is variably susceptible to tetracyclines, chloramphenicol, trimethoprim-sulfamethoxazole, and colistin.

== Pathogenesis and clinical characteristics ==
Originally isolated from patients with otitis media, A. xylosoxidans has since been periodically described as a pathogen of humans. In addition to otitis, it can cause a variety of other infections, including pneumonia, pharyngitis, peritonitis in association with catheters used for peritoneal dialysis, and urinary tract infections. Infection is sometimes associated with underlying immunodeficiency, including immunoglobulin M deficiency, various cancer chemotherapies, inhaled steroids, surgical procedures, prolonged or broad-spectrum antimicrobial treatment for other infections, and cystic fibrosis. It has also been the cause of hospital-acquired infections.

== See also ==
- List of sequenced bacterial genomes
