= Helicobacter typhlonius =

Scientific classification
- Domain: Bacteria
- Kingdom: Pseudomonadati
- Phylum: Campylobacterota
- Class: "Campylobacteria"
- Order: Campylobacterales
- Family: Helicobacteraceae
- Genus: Helicobacter
- Species: H. typhlonius

Binomial name
- Helicobacter typhlonius Franklin et al. 2001

Species of bacterium

Helicobacter typhlonius is a Gram-negative bacterium and opportunistic pathogen found in the genus Helicobacter. Only 35 known species are in this genus, which was described in 1982. H. typhlonius has a small number of close relatives, including Helicobacter muridarum, Helicobacter trogontum, and Helicobacter hepaticus, with the latter being the closest relative and much more prevalent.

== Taxonomy ==
Helicobacter typhlonius is one of 35 known species of Helicobacter. It was previously named Helicobacter sp. strain MIT 97-6910 by Fox et al., but was changed to its current name by Franklin et al. after discovering a genetically and morphologically identical organism that causes proliferative typhlocolitis, also known as irritable bowel disease. Some close relatives of H. typhlonius include H. muridarum, H. trogontum, H. hepaticus, and H. pylori.

== Morphology and physiology ==
Helicobacter typhlonius is motile due to its single sheathed flagellum. It has a spiral morphology, and its size is 0.3 by 2.0 to 3.0 μm. It is capable of ammonia assimilation, urea production, and phosphoribosyl pyrophosphate biosynthesis. H. typhlonius is also urease-negative, which is known to assist in survival and proliferation of microbes in acidic gastric environments. Additionally, it can only grow in microaerobic conditions (a very small amount of oxygen), not in aerobic or anaerobic conditions.

== Discovery ==
Helicobacter typhlonius was isolated from the feces of immunocompromised mice by James G. Fox and Craig L. Franklin in two separate laboratories in 1999. The mice suffered from irritable bowel syndrome, which was caused by H. typhlonius, but the mechanism of the infection was unknown. Polymerase chain reaction (PCR) was used to copy the DNA sequence of the bacteria to be examined. PCR was an ideal method, due to the unique intervening genome sequence that is easily recognized by PCR. The sequences were then analyzed using the Sequence Analysis Software Package (Wisconsin Package, version 10.0; Genetics Computer Group, Inc., Madison Wis.). The biochemical results of PCR tests, as well as phenotypic test results of all other 32 known species of Helicobacter, were compared to the results given by the newly isolated species. After observing the results and declaring H. typhlonius a new species of Helicobacter, a new phylogenetic tree for the genus Helicobacter was created.

== Genomics ==
The full genome was determined using single-molecule, real-time sequencing in 2015 by Frank et al. Using hierarchical genome assembly process, the sequences were assembled into a single long read.

The genome of H. typhlonius is 1,920,000 base pairs in length, with 2,117 protein-coding genes and 43 RNA genes with a GC-content of 38.8%. Compared to other members of the genus Helicobacter such as H. hepaticus and H. pylori, H. typhlonius has a larger genome. Furthermore, H. typhlonius has a GC-content that is similar to H. hepaticus. While roughly 75% of protein-coding genes were shared between H. hepaticus and H. typhlonius, 468 unique protein-coding genes were identified in H. typhlonius, which comprise about 2% of its entire genome.

Additionally, the genome contains a distinct pathogenicity island with a lower GC-content and flanked by repeats. This island is around 650,000 base pairs and compromises 75 protein-coding genes that include a type IV secretion system that is responsible for secreting toxins to assist in virulence.

== Metabolism ==
Helicobacter typhlonius is a microaerophile capable of oxidative phosphorylation using oxygen as a terminal electron acceptor. In this species, fermentation of pyruvate and Acetyl-CoA to acetate is possible in the absence of oxygen. Additionally, carbohydrate breakdown includes both sucrose and mannose and amino-acid degradation includes citrulline, aspartate, glutamate, and glutamine. H. typhlonius is also capable of arginine biosynthesis through the urea cycle.

== Ecology ==
Helicobacter typhlonius can grow at 37 and 42°C, but it cannot be grown at 25°C or in the presence of 1.5% sodium chloride. The typical spiral morphology can also change into cocci when grown in the presence of 1% glycine, but growth rate remains the same. Growth optima of H. typhlonius occur in microaerobic conditions. It is typically found in the gastrointestinal tract of immunodeficient rodents and humans, and is characterized by a 166-base-pair intervening sequence in its 16s rRNA, which has been previously detected by 16s rRNA gene sequence analysis.

== Significance ==
Helicobacter typhlonius is thought to cause irritable bowel syndrome (IBS) in both humans and animals, so it is used to study IBS pathogenesis and treatment. Along with this, some research has linked H. typhlonius with the regulation of intestinal tumors. From studying Apc-mutant mice, researchers were able to use PCR amplification to observe certain segments of DNA and narrow down the cause to two possible bacterial species: Akkermansia muciniphila and H. typhlonius. A positive correlation was established between the prevalence of these bacteria and tumor size. t H. typhlonius has also been found to cause typhlocolitis in immunocompromised mice. Typhlocolitis is characterized by inflammation and necrosis of the mucosal lining in the intestinal tract, specifically cecal, colonic, and small intestinal tissues.
