= Helicobacter pullorum =

Scientific classification
- Domain: Bacteria
- Kingdom: Pseudomonadati
- Phylum: Campylobacterota
- Class: "Campylobacteria"
- Order: Campylobacterales
- Family: Helicobacteraceae
- Genus: Helicobacter
- Species: H. pullorum

Binomial name
- Helicobacter pullorum Stanley et al. 1994

Species of bacterium

Helicobacter pullorum is a bacterium in the Helicobacteraceae family, Campylobacterales order. It was isolated from the liver, duodenum, and caecum of broiler and layer chickens, and from humans with gastroenteritis. It is a nongastric urease-negative Helicobacter species colonizing the lower bowel.
