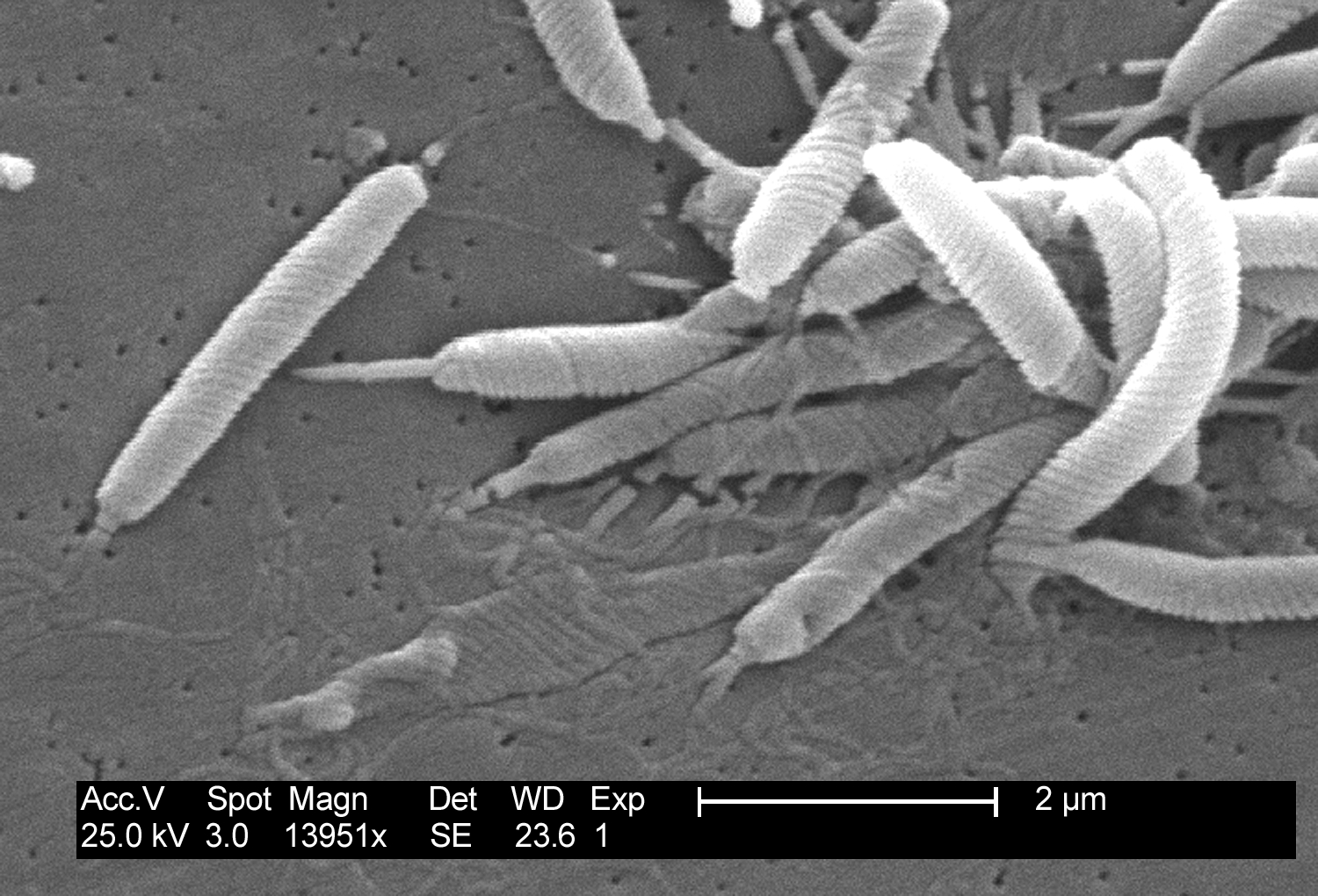
- Scanning electron micrograph of Helicobacter bilis bacteria

Scientific classification
- Domain: Bacteria
- Kingdom: Pseudomonadati
- Phylum: Campylobacterota
- Class: "Campylobacteria"
- Order: Campylobacterales
- Family: Helicobacteraceae
- Genus: Helicobacter
- Species: H. bilis

Binomial name
- Helicobacter bilis Fox et al., 1995

= Helicobacter bilis =

Species of bacterium

Helicobacter bilis is a bacterium in the Helicobacteraceae family, Campylobacterales order. It is a fusiform bacterium with three to 14 multiple bipolar sheathed flagella and periplasmic fibers wrapped around the cell. It is resistant to cephalothin and nalidixic acid, but sensitive to metronidazole. Like Helicobacter hepaticus, it colonizes the bile, liver, and intestine of mice, and is associated with multifocal chronic hepatitis and hepatocellular tumors.

This strain was originally isolated from a 47-year-old man with a one-month history of diarrhea, fever, and lower abdominal pain, and designated Flexispira rappini Romero et al. 1988. Hänninen et al. (2005) proposed to include this taxon in the species Helicobacter bilis, although based on 16S rRNA gene sequence, it is one of 10 distinct groups, which has been called Helicobacter sp. flexispira taxon 8 (provisionally Helicobacter rappini) [Dewhirst et al. 2000]. H. rappini has also been isolated from the feces of healthy people, dogs, and mice, as well as from patients with bacteremia. H. bilis and the other taxa include isolates from a wide range of host species, and have been associated with diarrhea, hepatitis, cholangitis, gallstones, liver cancer, and ovine abortion.
