= Helicobacter canadensis =

Scientific classification
- Domain: Bacteria
- Kingdom: Pseudomonadati
- Phylum: Campylobacterota
- Class: "Campylobacteria"
- Order: Campylobacterales
- Family: Helicobacteraceae
- Genus: Helicobacter
- Species: H. canadensis

Binomial name
- Helicobacter canadensis corrig. Fox et al. 2002

Species of bacterium

Helicobacter canadensis is a bacterium in the Helicobacteraceae family, Campylobacterales order, first isolated from humans with diarrhea. Its genome has been sequenced.
