= Helicobacter rodentium =

Scientific classification
- Domain: Bacteria
- Kingdom: Pseudomonadati
- Phylum: Campylobacterota
- Class: "Campylobacteria"
- Order: Campylobacterales
- Family: Helicobacteraceae
- Genus: Helicobacter
- Species: H. rodentium

Binomial name
- Helicobacter rodentium Shen et al., 1997

Species of bacterium

Helicobacter rodentium is a bacterium in the Helicobacteraceae family, Campylobacterales order. It is a spiral-shaped bacterium with a bipolar, single, nonsheathed flagellum. It is resistant to cephalothin and nalidixic acid. Its type strain is MIT 95-1707 (= ATCC 700285). Its name refers to the species first being isolated from mice.
