= Nautilia nitratireducens =

Scientific classification
- Domain: Bacteria
- Kingdom: Pseudomonadati
- Phylum: Campylobacterota
- Class: "Campylobacteria"
- Order: Nautiliales
- Family: Nautiliaceae
- Genus: Nautilia
- Species: N. nitratireducens

Binomial name
- Nautilia nitratireducens Pérez-Rodríguez et al. 2010

Type strain
- DSM 22087, EPR-MB1, JCM 15746, MB-1

Synonyms
- Nautilia hydrogenophila

Species of bacterium

Nautilia nitratireducens is a Gram-negative thermophilic, chemosynthetic, anaerobic bacterium from the genus of Nautilia which has been isolated from a hydrothermal vent from the East Pacific Rise.
