= Helicobacter anseris =

Scientific classification
- Domain: Bacteria
- Kingdom: Pseudomonadati
- Phylum: Campylobacterota
- Class: "Campylobacteria"
- Order: Campylobacterales
- Family: Helicobacteraceae
- Genus: Helicobacter
- Species: H. anseris

Binomial name
- Helicobacter anseris Fox et al. 2006

Species of bacterium

Helicobacter anseris is a bacterium in the Helicobacteraceae family, Campylobacterales order. It is Gram-negative, microaerophilic, spiral to curve-shaped, being first isolated from the faeces of geese.
