= Helicobacter canis =

Scientific classification
- Domain: Bacteria
- Kingdom: Pseudomonadati
- Phylum: Campylobacterota
- Class: "Campylobacteria"
- Order: Campylobacterales
- Family: Helicobacteraceae
- Genus: Helicobacter
- Species: H. canis

Binomial name
- Helicobacter canis Stanley et al., 1993

Species of bacterium

Helicobacter canis is a gram negative bacterium in the Helicobacteraceae family, Campylobacterales order. It was first identified and isolated from dog feces, though sheep and cats may also be important reservoirs of the bacterium. Its type strain is NCTC 12739^{T}. It colonises the lower bowel, but is also present in cases of hepatitis. Besides infecting dogs, this bacterium is known to cause infections in immunocompromised humans.

== Description ==
Cells of H. canis are spiral, sometimes with truncated ends. Flagella are single and bipolar, as well as sheathed, a characteristic of genus Helicobacter, and connected to a basal plate at their insertion into the cell.

== Epidemiology ==
H. canis infections have been identified globally in human and animal populations, including in Europe, South America, and Asia. The precise route of transmission is not well understood, though infections may spread through contact with saliva, vomit, and contaminated food or water. Other potential risks of indirect spread include exposure to domesticated dogs and cats.
