= Nautilia profundicola =

Scientific classification
- Domain: Bacteria
- Kingdom: Pseudomonadati
- Phylum: Campylobacterota
- Class: "Campylobacteria"
- Order: Nautiliales
- Family: Nautiliaceae
- Genus: Nautilia
- Species: N. profundicola

Binomial name
- Nautilia profundicola Smith et al, 2008

Species of bacterium

Nautilia profundicola is a gram-negative chemolithoautotrophic bacterium found around hydrothermal vents in the deep ocean. It was first discovered in 1999 on the East Pacific Rise at depth of 2,500 metres (8,200 ft), on the surface of the polychaete worm Alvinella pompejana. Nautilia profundicola lives symbiotically on the dorsal hairs of A. pompejana but they may also form biofilms and live independently on the walls of hydrothermal vents. The ability of N. profundicola to survive in an anaerobic environment rich in sulfur, H_{2} and CO_{2} of varying temperature makes it a useful organism to study, as these are the conditions that are theorized to have prevailed around the time of the earliest life on earth.

== Morphology ==
Nautilia profundicola is a motile, rod-shaped bacterium, around 0.4 μm long and 0.3 μm wide. Like most Campylobacterota (syn. Epsilonproteobacteria), it has an unsheathed polar flagellum.

== Physiology ==
Nautilia profundicola lives among the hydrothermal vents and can grow at temperatures of 30–55 °C (86–131 °F). It uses anaerobic respiration and is a chemolithoautotroph. Nautilia profundicola uses hydrogen or formate as an electron donor and sulfur an electron acceptor to produce hydrogen sulfide. Nautilia profundicola contains the protein reverse gyrase, which has been found amongst thermophilic bacteria, and which helps it survive the large temperature variation associated with its environment. Reverse gyrase is theorized to keep the genome stable and prevent damage by the extreme heat. Along with the ability to fix carbon and sulfur, analysis of the genome of Nautilia profundicola points to a novel pathway of nitrogen fixation.

== Taxonomy ==
Analysis of the 16S rRNA gene sequence of Nautilia profundicola allowed it to be placed in the family Nautiliaceae of the order Nautiliales in the phylum Campylobacterota. Analysis of this gene demonstrated that this organism shared 97.8 percent of its DNA for this gene with the related bacterium Nautilia lithotrophica. Using DNA–DNA hybridization, the total DNA-DNA relatedness of the two organisms was found to be 34.6 percent which, along with differences in phylogeny, allowed Nautilia profundicola to be classified as its own species.

== Genomic information ==
The genome of Nautilia profundicola consists of one circular chromosome of 1.7 million base pairs, which is small compared to other free-living Campylobacterota. There is relatively little evidence of the influence of horizontal gene transfer in the genome of Nautilia profundicola and this lack of external DNA is theorized to be a product of its own defense mechanisms or the lack of free DNA in the surrounding inhospitable environment.

== Ecological function ==
Nautilia profundicola is a member of the Campylobacterota, which are dominant in the vent ecosystem and are likely to be key players in the cycling of carbon, nitrogen, and sulfur. Nautilia profundicola has been found to have a symbiotic relationship with Alvinella pompejana, in which the worm secretes edible mucus, possibly in exchange for the bacterium's heat-resistant enzymes. This has the potential to explain how Alvinella pompejana can survive with one part of its body in 80 °C (176 °F) water in the vent and the rest of its body in 22 °C (72 °F) water outside the vent.
