= Helicobacter acinonychis =

Scientific classification
- Domain: Bacteria
- Kingdom: Pseudomonadati
- Phylum: Campylobacterota
- Class: "Campylobacteria"
- Order: Campylobacterales
- Family: Helicobacteraceae
- Genus: Helicobacter
- Species: H. acinonychis

Binomial name
- Helicobacter acinonychis corrig. Eaton et al. 1993

Species of bacterium

Helicobacter acinonychis is a bacterium in the Helicobacteraceae family, Campylobacterales order. It was first isolated from cheetahs (Acinonyx jubatus) with gastritis, so it has been associated with this disease in this particular species and others of its kind. It is Gram-negative, spiral-shaped, and grows under microaerophilic conditions. The type strain is 90-119 (CCUG 29263, ATCC 51101).
