= Helicobacter cholecystus =

Scientific classification
- Domain: Bacteria
- Kingdom: Pseudomonadati
- Phylum: Campylobacterota
- Class: "Campylobacteria"
- Order: Campylobacterales
- Family: Helicobacteraceae
- Genus: Helicobacter
- Species: H. cholecystus

Binomial name
- Helicobacter cholecystus Franklin et al. 1997

Species of bacterium

Helicobacter cholecystus is a bacterium first isolated from gallbladders of golden hamster with cholangiofibrosis and centrilobular pancreatitis. It is filamentous, Gram-negative, and motile, with a single polar-sheathed flagellum. It is also microaerophilic.
