= Sulfurovum lithotrophicum =

Scientific classification
- Domain: Bacteria
- Kingdom: Pseudomonadati
- Phylum: Campylobacterota
- Class: "Campylobacteria"
- Order: Campylobacterales
- Family: Helicobacteraceae
- Genus: Sulfurovum
- Species: S. lithotrophicum

Binomial name
- Sulfurovum lithotrophicum Inagaki et al. 2004

Species of bacterium

Sulfurovum lithotrophicum is a species of bacteria, the type species of its genus. It is a sulfur-oxidizing chemolithoautotroph within the ε-Proteobacteria isolated from Okinawa Trough hydrothermal sediments. It is mesophilic and also oxidises thiosulfate. It is a gram-negative, non-motile and coccoid to oval-shaped bacterium. The type strain is 42BKT^{T} (=ATCC BAA-797^{T} =JCM 12117^{T}).
