= Caminibacter mediatlanticus =

Scientific classification
- Domain: Bacteria
- Kingdom: Pseudomonadati
- Phylum: Campylobacterota
- Class: "Campylobacteria"
- Order: Nautiliales
- Family: Nautiliaceae
- Genus: Caminibacter
- Species: C. mediatlanticus

Binomial name
- Caminibacter mediatlanticus Voordeckers et al. 2005

Type strain
- DSM 16658, JCM 12641, TB-2

Species of bacterium

Caminibacter mediatlanticus is a Gram-negative, anaerobic, chemolithoautotrophic, thermophilic bacterium from the genus Caminibacter which has been isolated from a hydrothermal vent from the Mid-Atlantic Ridge.
