= Nautilia abyssi =

Scientific classification
- Domain: Bacteria
- Kingdom: Pseudomonadati
- Phylum: Campylobacterota
- Class: "Campylobacteria"
- Order: Nautiliales
- Family: Nautiliaceae
- Genus: Nautilia
- Species: N. abyssi

Binomial name
- Nautilia abyssi Alain et al. 2009

Type strain
- DSM 21157, JCM 15390, PH1209

Species of bacterium

Nautilia abyssi is a thermophilic, sulfur-reducing and strictly anaerobic bacterium from the genus of Nautilia which has been isolated from a hydrothermal chimney from the East Pacific Rise.
