= Helicobacter muridarum =

Scientific classification
- Domain: Bacteria
- Kingdom: Pseudomonadati
- Phylum: Campylobacterota
- Class: "Campylobacteria"
- Order: Campylobacterales
- Family: Helicobacteraceae
- Genus: Helicobacter
- Species: H. muridarum

Binomial name
- Helicobacter muridarum Lee et al., 1992

Species of bacterium

Helicobacter muridarum is a helical, gram-negative bacterium in the Helicobacteraceae family, Campylobacterales order. This species is microaerophilic and was first isolated from the intestinal mucosa of rodents, hence its name. It is characterised by the presence of 9 to 11 periplasmic fibers which appear as concentric helical ridges on the surface of each cell. The cells are motile and have bipolar tufts of 10 to 14 sheathed flagella. These bacteria are nutritionally fastidious and physiologically similar to other Helicobacter species and Wolinella succinogenes, but can be differentiated from these organisms by their unique cellular ultrastructure. ST1T (= ATCC 49282T) is its type strain.
