= Helicobacter pametensis =

Scientific classification
- Domain: Bacteria
- Kingdom: Pseudomonadati
- Phylum: Campylobacterota
- Class: "Campylobacteria"
- Order: Campylobacterales
- Family: Helicobacteraceae
- Genus: Helicobacter
- Species: H. pametensis

Binomial name
- Helicobacter pametensis Dewhirst et al. 1994

Species of bacterium

Helicobacter pametensis is a gram-negative bacterium in the Helicobacteraceae family, Campylobacterales order. This species was first isolated from bird and swine faeces. Its cells are motile and possess one subterminal sheathed flagellum at each end.
