= Caminibacter profundus =

Scientific classification
- Domain: Bacteria
- Kingdom: Pseudomonadati
- Phylum: Campylobacterota
- Class: "Campylobacteria"
- Order: Nautiliales
- Family: Nautiliaceae
- Genus: Caminibacter
- Species: C. profundus

Binomial name
- Caminibacter profundus Miroshnichenko et al. 2004

Species of bacterium

Caminibacter profundus is a species of moderately thermophilic, microaerobic to anaerobic, chemolithoautotrophic bacterium. It is a Gram-negative, non-motile rod, with type strain CR^{T} (=DSM 15016^{T} =JCM 11957^{T}).
