= Caminibacter hydrogeniphilus =

Scientific classification
- Domain: Bacteria
- Kingdom: Pseudomonadati
- Phylum: Campylobacterota
- Class: "Campylobacteria"
- Order: Nautiliales
- Family: Nautiliaceae
- Genus: Caminibacter
- Species: C. hydrogeniphilus

Binomial name
- Caminibacter hydrogeniphilus Alain et al. 2002

Species of bacterium

Caminibacter hydrogeniphilus is a species of thermophilic, hydrogen-oxidizing bacterium. It is anaerobic, rod-shaped (1.01-5 x 0.5 micrometres), motile and has polar flagella. The type strain is AM1116^{T} (= DSM 14510^{T} = CIP 107140^{T}).
