= Nitratiruptor =

Scientific classification
- Domain: Bacteria
- Phylum: Campylobacterota
- Class: Campylobacteria
- Order: Campylobacterales
- Family: Nitratiruptoraceae
- Genus: Nitratiruptor Nakagawa et al. 2005

Type species
- Nitratiruptor tergarcus Nakagawa et al. 2005

Species
- N. tergarcus

Genus of deep sea proteobacteria

Nitratiruptor sp. (strain SB155-2) is a genus of deep sea gram-negative Campylobacterota isolated from Iheya North Hydrothermal field in Okinawa Trough (Japan). This rod-shaped microorganism (0.5 x 1.5 μm) grows chemolithoautotrophically in a wide variety of electron donors and acceptors (i.e. sulfur, hydrogen, oxygen and nitrate) in absence of light and oxygen. It is also a thermophilic group capable of growing within the range of 37–65 °C with the optimal at 55 °C.

== Genetic features ==
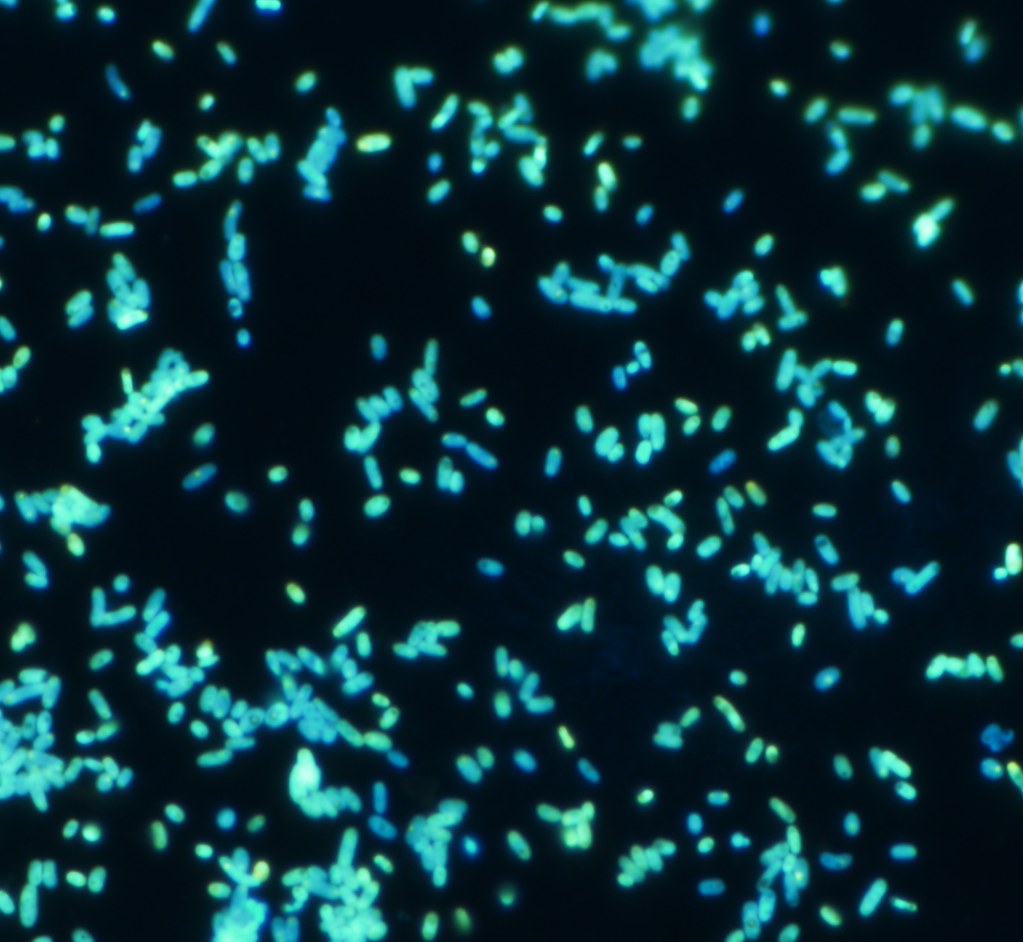
DAPI stained Nitratiruptor cells (SB155-2) growing in laboratory conditions

Nitratiruptor sp. genome is composed by a single circular chromosome of 1,877,931 bp with the GC content of 43.8% and 39.7%. Due to the geochemical variability in the deep-sea hydrothermal vents, Nitratiruptor sp. displays a metabolic versatility to adapt to this hostile environments which includes sharp gradients in energy sources, electron acceptors or carbon sources. For instance, due to the metal-rich fluids characterizing this areas, a total of 17 genes related with transports systems and detoxification mechanisms of heavy metals (including As, Cd and Cu) were described. Despite this not being a pathogenic bacterium, it possess some virulence genes (including virulence factor mviN, hemolysin or N-linked glycosylation gene cluster) which provide insights into the origins of virulence in their pathogenic relatives, Helicobacter and Campylobacter species.

== Phylogeny ==
The currently accepted taxonomy is based on the List of Prokaryotic names with Standing in Nomenclature (LPSN) and National Center for Biotechnology Information (NCBI).

16S rRNA based LTP_10_2024

- - Nitrosophilus alvini Shiotani et al. 2021 (type sp.)
  - - Nitratiruptor tergarcus Nakagawa et al. 2005
    - - Nitrosophilus species‑group 2
        - Nitrosophilus labii (Fukushi et al. 2021) Shiotani et al. 2021
        - Nitrosophilus kaiyonis Fukazawa et al. 2023

120 marker proteins based GTDB 10-RS226

- - Nitrosophilus alvini
  - - Nitratiruptor tergarcus
    - - Nitrosophilus_A
        - Nitrosophilus labii [Nitratiruptor labii Fukushi et al. 2021]
        - Nitrosophilus kaiyonis
