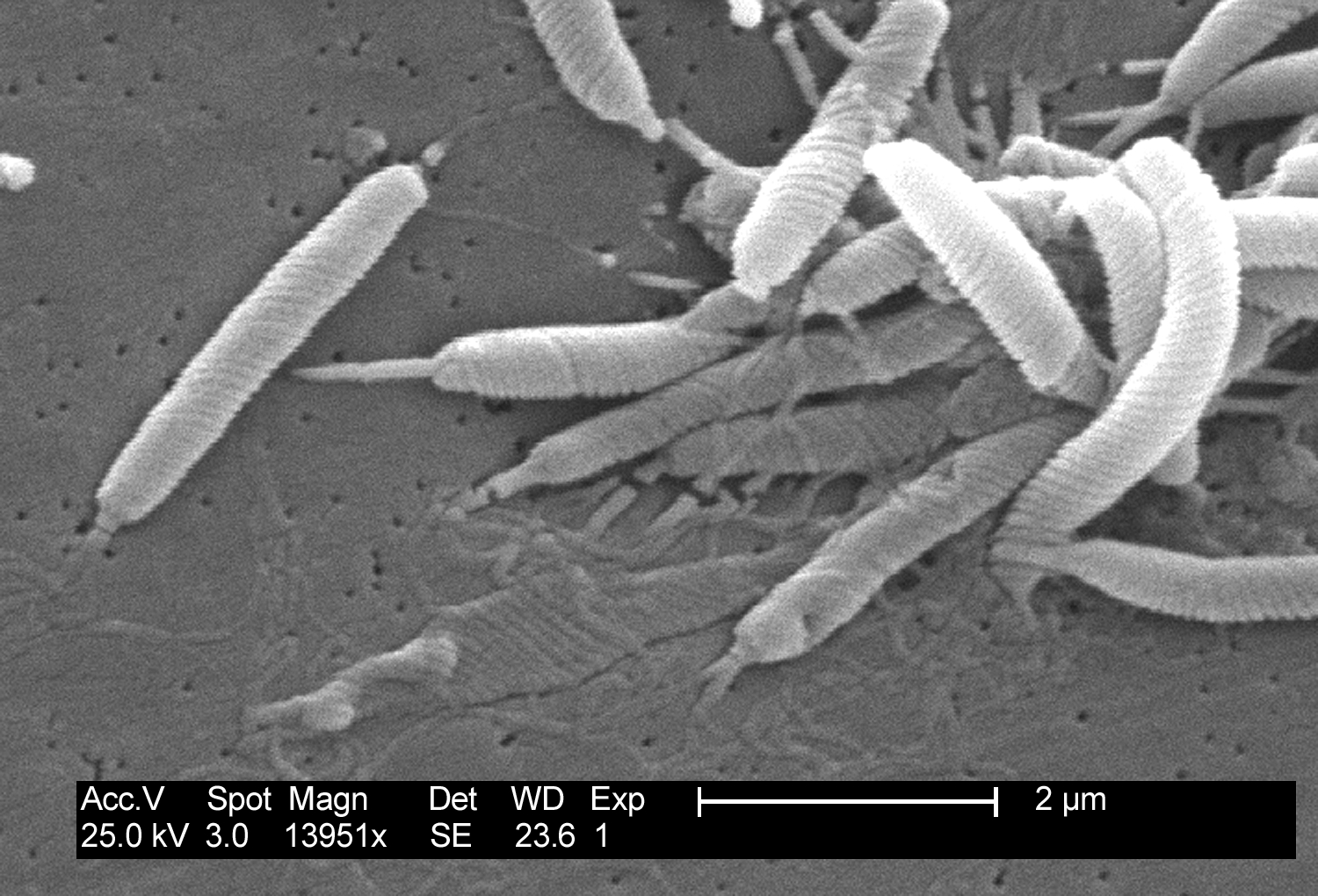

Scientific classification
- Domain: Bacteria
- Kingdom: Pseudomonadati
- Phylum: Campylobacterota
- Class: "Campylobacteria"
- Order: Campylobacterales
- Family: Helicobacteraceae
- Genus: Helicobacter
- Species: H. cinaedi

Binomial name
- Helicobacter cinaedi (Totten et al. 1988) Vandamme et al. 1991

Synonyms
- Campylobacter cinaedi Totten et al. 1988

= Helicobacter cinaedi =

Species of bacterium

Helicobacter cinaedi is a bacterium in the family Helicobacteraceae, Campylobacterales order, Helicobacteraceae family, Helicobacter genus. It was formerly known as Campylobacter cinaedi until molecular analysis published in 1991 led to a major revision of the genus Campylobacter. H. cinaedi is a curved, spiral (i.e. S-shaped), or fusiform (i.e. spindle-shaped) rod with flagellum at both of its ends (i.e. bipolar flagella) which it uses to dart around. The bacterium is a pathogen.

Like many other species in the Helicobacter genus (see Helicobacter heilmannii sensu lato), H. cinaedi infects not only animals, but also humans. While common in animals, it was once thought to be an extremely rare infection in humans and to occur almost always in those who are immunocompromised. However,H. cinaedi infections are now regarded as more common than previously thought and to occur not only in immunocompromised individuals, but also in individuals suffering various types of medical conditions that are not associated with defective immunity, in patients as part of a nosocomial (i.e. hospital-acquired) infection, and, to a lesser extent, in immunocompetent individuals who have no known predisposing medical conditions. In particular, studies conducted in Japan indicate that H. cinaedi infections can occur in groups of individuals who are associated with each other in nonhospital and nonmedical settings. These community-acquired infections occur principally in immunocompetent individuals.

While many H. cinaedi infections in humans involve the gastrointestinal tract and may have a remitting and relapsing course, some of these infections spread to the blood to cause life-threatening bacteremia. This is particularly the case in hospital-borne/medical setting infections that occur in immunocompromised individuals, those with H. cinaedi bacteremia, particularly those who acquire it in a community setting, typically display no life-threatening or other symptoms except fever. In any event, even the severest cases of H. cinaedi infections, especially those occurring in immunocompetent individuals who acquire the bacterium in a community setting, have been successfully treated with antibiotics.

== Epidemiology and transmission to humans ==
Helicobacter cinaedi has been isolated from cats, dogs, hamsters, rats, foxes, and rhesus monkeys; the bacterium is part of the normal intestinal bacterial flora of hamsters. Many species of Helicobacter such as the five species of H. heilmannii sensu lato are transmitted to humans by close contact with infected animals. Reports have suggested that humans are likewise infected with H. cinaedi by direct contact (i.e. zoonotic transmission) with animals (particularly hamsters and farm animals) harboring the bacterium. However, there are no reports of the simultaneous isolation of this bacterium in human patients and their close contact animals. Consequently, the role of zoonotic transmission in the infection of humans with H. cinaedi is unclear and requires further study.

Studies conducted in Japan have reported finding H. cinaedi in the feces of healthy humans, as well as in the blood of 46 persons who were concurrently afflicted with H. cinaedi at a single hospital. Hospital-born, medical setting-born, and community-born infections in smaller numbers of patients have also been reported. These studies allow a possibility that H. cinaedi may be, at least in some cases, transmitted between humans either directly (e.g. through oral contact) or indirectly (e.g. through contaminated surfaces, clothing, bedding, or other objects).

== Human infections ==
Individuals (age range: newborn to elderly) with H. cinaedi infections have presented with acute or chronic gastroenteritis (i.e. inflammation of the stomach and/or intestines), cellulitis (i.e. bacterial infection and inflammation of the inner layers of the skin), and/or bacteremia (i.e. the bacterium circulating in the blood). This bacteremia may be associated with no symptoms except fever or with full-blown sepsis symptoms. Less commonly, infected individuals have presented with septic arthritis, infection of an artificial joint, infection of a vascular bypass graft, or meningitis. Cases of bacteremia are often (~30% of all cases) accompanied by cellulitis at multiple sites in the skin. These infections have tended to occur in persons who are immunocompromised due to HIV/AIDS, X-linked agammaglobulinemia, common variable immunodeficiency, various malignancies (e.g. lung cancer, multiple myeloma, leukemia, lymphoma, or the myelodysplastic syndrome), chemotherapy treatments, or splenectomy. H. cinaedi infection has also occurred in persons whose immune function may be defective as a result of, or in association with, chronic renal failure or autoimmune diseases (i.e. systemic lupus erythematosus and rheumatoid arthritis).

== Diagnosis ==
The diagnosis of H. cinaedei infection is made difficult by the fastidiousness of this organism; in culture, it grows very slowly and requires high humidity and microaerobic conditions. Furthermore, the bacterium, while being able to be cultured from blood specimens, is far harder to culture from tissue lesions such as those in the skin. Consequently, the diagnosis of H. cinaedie infection has been heavily based on patient clinical presentations, histology of lesions including special staining for the bacterium, and analyses of tissue specimens by DNA sequencing and species-specific polymerase chain reactions to identify nucleotide gene sequences specific to the bacterium.

== Treatment ==
The various types of human H. cinaedi infections, including the more severe ones such as bacteremia, meningitis, and artificial joint infection, have been successfully treated with regimens that include a single or multiple antibiotics. The bacterium is highly sensitive to carbapenem, aminoglycoside, cephalosporin, and tetracycline antibiotics and moderately sensitive to β-lactam antibiotics, but has often been found to be resistant to macrolides, quinolones, and metronidazole. However, the infection has frequently recurred even in patients who have been treated with an appropriate antibiotic regimen. For example, one patient with H. cinaedi bacteremia had been successfully treated with cephazolin (a β-lactam antibiotic) and panipenem (a carbapenem antibiotic), but had two symptom recurrences, each of which was successfully retreated with the same antibiotic regimen. Longer-term initial antibiotic treatments may reduce these recurrences.

=== Prevention ===
Careful monitoring of H. cinaedi in the hospital/medical setting may prevent nosocomial infections. Monitoring may be particularly helpful in sections or wards of hospitals that treat immunocompromised patients, e.g. cancer or other wards that focus on treating patients with chemotherapy.

== Prognosis ==
The prognosis of patients with H. cinaedi infections is generally good, with many symptoms showing improvements within 2–3 days of starting antibiotics. However, patients receiving short-term (e.g. ≤10 days) antibiotic treatments experience recurrent symptoms in 30 to 60% of cases. The Centers for Disease Control now recommends that initial antibiotic treatment regimens for infections with this bacterium be extended to 2–6 weeks. Conventional antibiotic regimens used to treat H. cinaedi bacteremia in immune-incompetent individuals is reported to have a mortality rate after 30 days of treatment of 6.3%.
