= Nautilia =

Scientific classification
- Domain: Bacteria
- Kingdom: Pseudomonadati
- Phylum: Campylobacterota
- Class: "Campylobacteria"
- Order: Nautiliales
- Family: Nautiliaceae
- Genus: Nautilia; Miroshnichenko et al. 2002

Type species
- Nautilia lithotrophica Miroshnichenko et al. 2002

Species
- N. abyssi; N. lithotrophicai; N. nitratireducensi; N. profundicolai

Genus of bacteria

Nautilia is a genus of bacteria from the family of Campylobacterota.

== Phylogeny ==
The currently accepted taxonomy is based on the List of Prokaryotic names with Standing in Nomenclature (LPSN) and National Center for Biotechnology Information (NCBI).

16S rRNA based LTP_10_2024

- Nautilia
  - N. nitratireducens Perez-Rodriguez et al. 2010
  - - N. lithotrophica Miroshnichenko et al. 2002
    - - N. abyssi Alain et al. 2009
      - N. profundicola Smith et al. 2008

120 marker proteins based GTDB 09-RS220

- Nautilia
  - N. profundicola Smith et al. 2008

== See also ==
- List of bacterial orders
- List of bacteria genera
