= Sulfuricurvum =

Scientific classification
- Domain: Bacteria
- Kingdom: Pseudomonadati
- Phylum: Campylobacterota
- Class: "Campylobacteria"
- Order: Campylobacterales
- Family: Helicobacteraceae
- Genus: Sulfuricurvum; Kodama and Watanabe 2004
- Species: S. kujiense

Binomial name
- Sulfuricurvum kujiense Kodama and Watanabe 2004

Species of bacterium

Sulfuricurvum kujiense is a facultatively anaerobic, chemolithoautotrophic, sulfur-oxidizing, gram-negative bacterium, the type species of its genus. Its cells are motile, curved rods and have a single polar flagellum. Its type strain is YK-1^{T} (=JCM 11577^{T} =MBIC 06352^{T} =ATCC BAA-921^{T}). It is the only species in the genus Sulfuricurvum.
