= Helicobacter trogontum =

Scientific classification
- Domain: Bacteria
- Kingdom: Pseudomonadati
- Phylum: Campylobacterota
- Class: "Campylobacteria"
- Order: Campylobacterales
- Family: Helicobacteraceae
- Genus: Helicobacter
- Species: H. trogontum

Binomial name
- Helicobacter trogontum Mendes et al. 1996

Species of bacterium

Helicobacter trogontum is a bacterium in the Helicobacteraceae family, Campylobacterales order. It was first isolated from rat intestine. It is Gram-negative, its cells are rod-shaped with pointed ends, and its protoplasmic cylinder is entwined with periplasmic fibers. It is microaerophilic. The type strain is LRB 8581 (= ATCC 700114).
