= Helicobacter cetorum =

Scientific classification
- Domain: Bacteria
- Kingdom: Pseudomonadati
- Phylum: Campylobacterota
- Class: "Campylobacteria"
- Order: Campylobacterales
- Family: Helicobacteraceae
- Genus: Helicobacter
- Species: H. cetorum

Binomial name
- Helicobacter cetorum Harper et al. 2006

Species of bacterium

Helicobacter cetorum is a Gram-negative, microaerophilic, spiral (helical) bacterium that is usually found in the stomachs of whales and dolphins. Based on 16S rRNA sequencing, its genome is very similar to that of Helicobacter pylori in that it can cause gastric disease in these animals. Originally isolated among Atlantic white-sided dolphins and Beluga whales in 2000, H. cetorum has been associated with hemorrhages throughout its entire gastrointestinal tract, but its role has not yet been discovered. Prior to the discovery of H. cetorum, there have not been any other Helicobacter species reported in dolphins.

== Microbiology ==
=== Morphology ===
Helicobacter cetorum is a helical, Gram-negative bacteria that is 4 μm long, 0.6 μm wide, and contains a bipolar flagella. It was originally isolated from fecal samples of Atlantic white-sided dolphins and Beluga whales, and the samples were then visualized via electron microscopy and by Gram stain and Stein's silver stain in tissue.

=== Physiology ===
Helicobacter cetorum is able to grow under microaerophilic conditions at 37-42 °C, but not at 25 °C, and similar to H. pylori, it produces urease, catalase, and oxidase. The isolated samples were resistant to nalidixic acid but sensitive to cephalothin.

=== Genome ===
Helicobacter cetorum strains have been isolated in both dolphins and whales, and their genomes are 1.83 Mb and 1.95 Mb, respectively. In addition, 16S rRNA amplicons were isolated and amplified using PCR, and 1,200 bp amplicons were generated.

== Pathophysiology ==
Among the samples collected from Beluga whales and dolphins, common symptoms included intermittent inappetence, lethargy, chronic regurgitation and weight loss, and endoscopies performed on each of these animals demonstrated esophageal and forestomach ulcers. Within the Atlantic white-sided dolphins, multifocal coalescing hemorrhages and mucosal hemorrhages were discovered in the jejunum and the pyloric stomach, respectively. Even though there is evidence to suggest that there is an association between H. cetorum and the gastric diseases and ulcers reported in these animals, the role that this bacterium plays in these illnesses is unclear.
