= Lebetimonas acidiphila =

Scientific classification
- Domain: Bacteria
- Kingdom: Pseudomonadati
- Phylum: Campylobacterota
- Class: "Campylobacteria"
- Order: Nautiliales
- Family: Nautiliaceae
- Genus: Lebetimonas
- Species: L. acidiphila

Binomial name
- Lebetimonas acidiphila Takai et al. 2005

Type strain
- DSM 16356, JCM 12420, strain Pd55

Synonyms
- Calderomonas acidophila

Species of bacterium

Lebetimonas acidiphila is a thermophilic, acidophilic, hydrogen-oxidizing and motile bacterium from the genus of Lebetimonas. To observe growth, the temperature should be between 30 and 68 degrees Celsius.
