= Lebetimonas natsushimae =

Scientific classification
- Domain: Bacteria
- Kingdom: Pseudomonadati
- Phylum: Campylobacterota
- Class: "Campylobacteria"
- Order: Nautiliales
- Family: Nautiliaceae
- Genus: Lebetimonas
- Species: L. natsushimae

Binomial name
- Lebetimonas natsushimae Nagata et al. 2017

Type strain
- DSM 104102, NBRC 112478, strain HS1857

Species of bacterium

Lebetimonas natsushimae is a moderately thermophilic, strictly anaerobic and chemoautotrophic bacterium from the genus of Lebetimonas which has been isolated from a hydrothermal vent from the Mid-Okinawa Trough.
