= Caminibacter =

Scientific classification
- Domain: Bacteria
- Kingdom: Pseudomonadati
- Phylum: Campylobacterota
- Class: "Campylobacteria"
- Order: Nautiliales
- Family: Nautiliaceae
- Genus: Caminibacter; Alain et al. 2002

Type species
- Caminibacter hydrogeniphilus Alain et al. 2002

Species
- C. hydrogeniphilus; C. mediatlanticus; C. pacificus; C. profundus

Genus of bacteria

Caminibacter is a genus of anaerobic and thermophilic bacteria from the family Nautiliaceae.

== Phylogeny ==
The currently accepted taxonomy is based on the List of Prokaryotic names with Standing in Nomenclature (LPSN) and National Center for Biotechnology Information (NCBI).

16S rRNA based LTP_10_2024

- - Cetia pacifica Grosche et al. 2015
  - - Caminibacter
      - C. hydrogeniphilus Alain et al. 2002
      - - C. mediatlanticus Voordeckers et al. 2005
        - C. profundus Miroshnichenko et al. 2004

120 marker proteins based GTDB 10-RS226

- Caminibacter
  - C. pacificus (Grosche et al. 2015) Shiotani et al. 2021
  - C. mediatlanticus

== See also ==
- List of bacterial orders
- List of bacteria genera
