= Nautilia lithotrophica =

Scientific classification
- Domain: Bacteria
- Kingdom: Pseudomonadati
- Phylum: Campylobacterota
- Class: "Campylobacteria"
- Order: Nautiliales
- Family: Nautiliaceae
- Genus: Nautilia
- Species: N. lithotrophica

Binomial name
- Nautilia lithotrophica Miroshnichenko et al. 2002

Species of bacterium

Nautilia lithotrophica is a thermophilic sulfur-reducing epsilon-proteobacterium isolated from a deep-sea hydrothermal vent. It is strictly anaerobic, with type strain 525^{T} (= DSM 13520^{T}).
