= Lebetimonas =

Scientific classification
- Domain: Bacteria
- Kingdom: Pseudomonadati
- Phylum: Campylobacterota
- Class: "Campylobacteria"
- Order: Nautiliales
- Family: Nautiliaceae
- Genus: Lebetimonas; Takai et al. 2005

Type species
- Lebetimonas acidiphila Takai et al. 2005

Species
- L. acidiphila; L. natsushimae

Genus of bacteria

Lebetimonas is a genus of bacteria from the family Nautiliaceae.

== See also ==
- List of bacterial orders
- List of bacteria genera
