= Whale feces =

Whale excrement and its role in ocean ecology

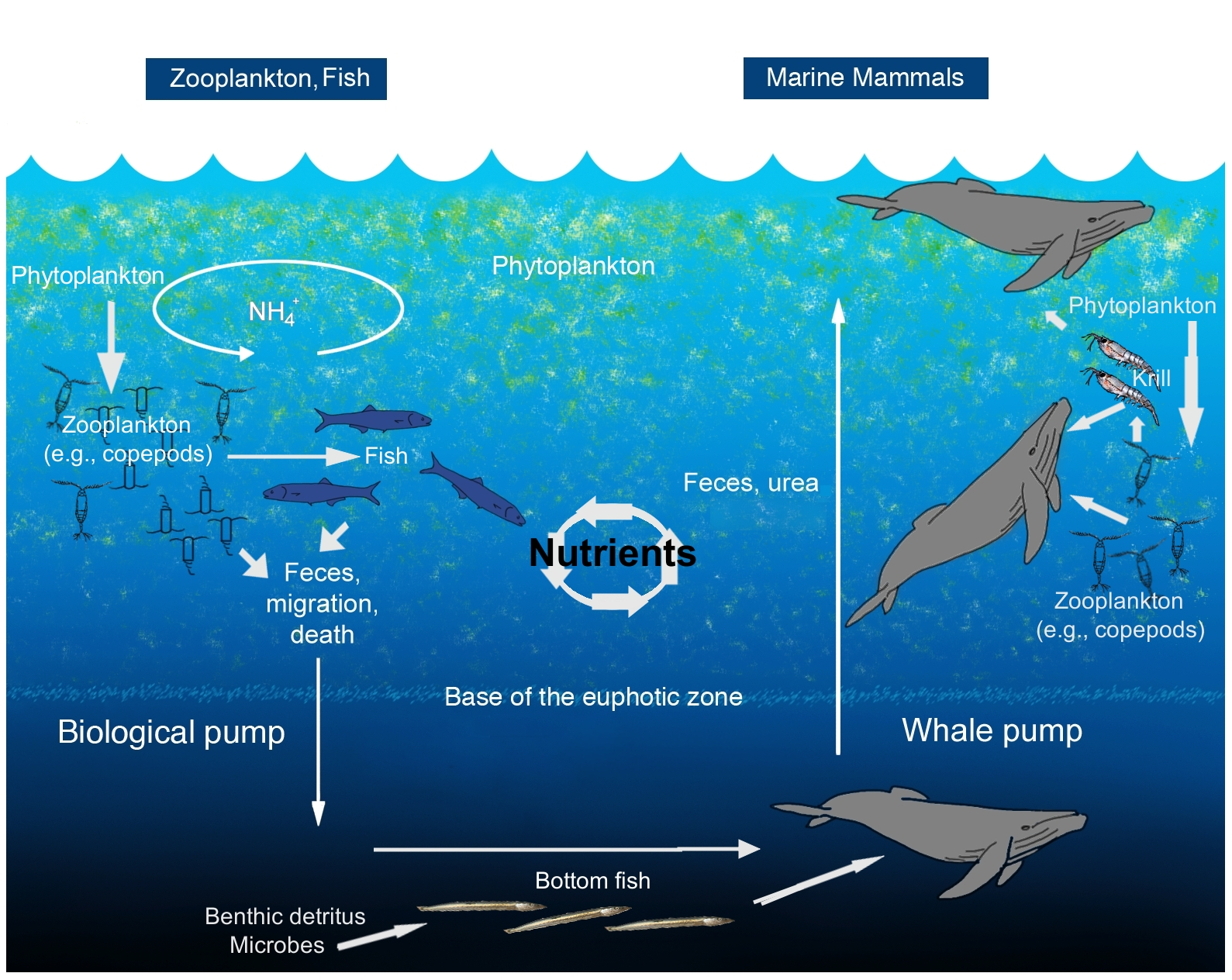
"Whale pump" – the role played by whales in nutrient recycling in the oceans (based on Fig. 1 of Roman & McCarthy (2010))

Whale feces, the excrement of whales, have a vital role in the ecology of oceans, earning whales the title of "marine ecosystem engineers". This significant ecological role stems from the nutrients and compounds found in whale feces, which have far-reaching effects on marine life.

Nitrogen and iron chelate released by cetacean species offer significant benefits to the marine food chain and contribute to long-term carbon sequestration. Additionally, whale feces contain a wealth of information about the health, natural history, and ecology of individual animals or groups. This source of information includes DNA, hormones, toxins, and various other chemicals. Studying whale feces provides valuable insights into the lives of these marine creatures, aiding scientists in understanding their behaviors, diets, and overall well-being. Furthermore, the nutrients released through whale feces play a vital role in marine ecosystems, supporting phytoplankton growth, enhancing the food chain, and contributing to the overall health of the oceans.

In addition to feces, the digestive system of sperm whales produces ambergris, a solid, waxy, flammable substance of a dull grey or blackish color which can be found floating on the sea or washed up on the coast.

== Description ==
Whales excrete plumes of liquid feces that are flocculent in nature, consisting of loose aggregations of particles. These feces, often found floating on the sea surface after being excreted underwater before it dissociates, contain undigested hard objects such as squid beaks. Fecal samples are characterized by color, odor, texture, and buoyancy, providing valuable information about the health and ecology of whales. Flatulence has been recorded in whales.

== Ecological significance ==
Whales transport more nitrogen through their feces in the Gulf of Maine than all of the rivers in that system combined.

— Briana Abrahms

=== Nutrient cycling and carbon sequestration ===
One of the crucial roles of whale feces is in nutrient cycling, particularly nitrogen circulation in the ocean. Whales transport more nitrogen through their feces in certain regions than all the rivers combined, enriching both primary and secondary productivity. Additionally, the iron-rich feces of krill-eating whales encourage phytoplankton growth, benefiting the marine food chain and sequestering carbon dioxide for extended periods. The Southern Ocean, rich in nutrients but iron-deficient, experiences increased phytoplankton bloom due to whale feces, acting as a significant carbon sink.

The phenomenon of whales defecating near the water's surface reverses the typical flow of nutrients in the ocean's biological pump, contributing to the "whale pump". Whales feed at deeper levels where krill is found, and their fecal matter, rich in iron, rises to the surface. This action enhances phytoplankton productivity and supports fish populations. Whales, along with krill, form a positive feedback loop, where their populations contribute to the recycling of iron, further boosting phytoplankton growth.

A study in the Gulf of Maine extrapolated from modern levels nitrogen recycling in the sea due to marine mammals, such as cetaceans and seals, prior to the advent of commercial culling, estimating a former level thrice that of supply of nitrogen fixed from the atmosphere. Even today, despite reduction of marine mammal populations and increase in nitrogen uptake from the atmosphere and nitrogen pollution, the local clustering of marine mammals plays a significant role in maintaining the productivity in the regions they frequent. The enrichment is not only in primary productivity but also secondary productivity in the form of abundance in fish populations.

The study assumes that whales tend to defecate more commonly in the upper part of the water column, which they frequent for breathing; additionally the feces tend to float. Whales feed at deeper levels of the ocean where krill is found. The fecal action of whales thus reverses the usual flow of nutrients of the ocean's "biological pump" due to the downward flow of "marine snow" and other detritus from surface to bottom. The phenomenon has been termed the "whale pump".

The Gulf of Maine study also found that the view of whales and other marine mammals as competitors for fishing, advocated by some nations, is incorrect as whales play a vital role in maintaining the productivity of phytoplankton and consequently the fish. Culling marine mammal populations threatens the nutrient supply and the productivity of fishing grounds.

In addition, the feces of krill-eating whales are rich in iron. The release of iron from whale feces encourages the growth of phytoplankton in the sea, which not only benefits the marine food chain, but also sequesters carbon for long periods of time. When phytoplankton, which is not consumed in its lifetime, perishes, it descends through the euphotic zone and settles down into the depths of sea. Phytoplankton sequesters an estimated 2 billion tons of carbon dioxide into the ocean each year, causing the ocean to become a sink of carbon dioxide which holds an estimated 90% of all sequestered carbon. The Southern Ocean is amongst the largest ranges for phytoplankton and has the characteristic of being nutrient-rich in terms of phosphate, nitrate and silicate, while it is iron-deficient at the same time. Increases of nutrient iron result in blooming of phytoplankton. Whale feces are up to 10 million times richer in iron than the surrounding sea water and plays a vital role in providing the iron required for maintaining phytoplankton biomass on the earth. The iron defecation of just the 12,000 strong sperm whale population in the Southern Ocean results in the sequestration of 200,000 tonnes of atmospheric carbon per year.

A study of the Southern Ocean found that whales not only recycled iron concentrations vital for phytoplankton, but also formed, along with krill, a major source of sequestered iron in the ocean, up to 24% of the iron held in the surface waters of Southern Ocean. Whales formed part of a positive feedback loop and if whale populations are allowed to recover in the Southern Ocean, greater productivity of phytoplankton will result as larger amounts of iron are recycled through the system.

Accordingly, whales are referred to as "marine ecosystem engineers".

A study conducted in the Fernando de Noronha Archipelago of the southwest Atlantic Ocean, revealed the feces and vomit of Spinner dolphins (Stenella longirostris) formed part of the diet of twelve species of reef fish from seven different families. The most prolific consumer was the black triggerfish or black durgon (Melichthys niger), which could even discern the postures dolphins assumed prior to voiding and positioned themselves for effective feeding. All these offal eating fish species are recorded plankton eaters and it is considered that this type of feeding may represent a change in its usual diet, i.e. drifting plankton.

Whales, along with other large animals, play a significant role in the transport of nutrients in global ecological cycles. Population reduction of whales and other large animals has severely affected the efficacy of pump mechanisms which transport nutrients from the deep sea to the continental shelves.

== Whale feces as indicators of health and ecology ==
Nitrogen release by cetacean species
Species	Nitrogen excreted (kg/day)
Baleen whales
Right whale	15.9
Humpback whale	9.42
Fin whale	15.0
Sei whale	8.32
Minke whale	2.94
Toothed whales
Pilot whale	0.036
Atlantic white-sided dolphin	0.15
Common dolphin	0.09
Harbour porpoise	0.05

Whale feces contain DNA, hormones, toxins and other chemicals which can give information on a number of aspects of the health, natural history and ecology of the animal concerned. Feces have also provided information on the bacteria present in the gastro-intestinal tract of whales and dolphins.

=== Indicator for diet composition ===
A 2016 research study used fecal analysis of wild orcas, which spent the summer season in the Salish Sea, for quantitively estimation of prey species. The analysis was consistent with earlier estimates based on surface prey remains. The study found that salmonids comprised over 98.6% of the identified genetic sequences with Chinook and Coho salmon species as the most important prey species.

=== As indicator for population decline ===
A research study, published in 2012, on impacts of overfishing and maritime traffic on a wild population of the Southern Resident Killer Whales of the western seaboard of North America, was based on the chemical analysis of fecal specimens of orcas. The study aimed to find out the reasons for orca decline for which three causes were hypothesized - disturbance by boats and ships, lack of food, and, long-term exposure of toxins which accumulate in whale fat, namely DDT, PBDT and PCB.

Fecal samples of orca were detected with the help of a trained spotter dog, a black Labrador Retriever, named "Tucker", from a firm Conservation Canines. The dog could detect fresh scat from orcas while following in a boat 200 to 400 meters (660 to 1,310 ft) behind a pod of orcas. Fecal samples collected were tested for the presence and quantity of DNA, as well as stress, nutrition and reproductive hormones, and toxins such as PBDE, PCB, and DDT congeners.

The fecal samples were analyzed over time and co-related to boat densities over time and the quantity of Fraser River Chinook salmon, the main constituent of orca diet in those regions. Boat densities and the salmon abundance over time were estimated independently. Glucocorticoids in orcas rise when the animal faces psychological tension or starvation. The study found that prey is maximum in August, at which time, boats are most abundant. Conversely, the availability of salmon was minimum in late fall when the level of marine boat traffic was also the least. Glucocorticoid levels were highest in the fall when there was a shortage of prey and maximum during August at the height of availability of food.

Similarly, thyroid hormones co-relate to nutritional stress, enabling animals to lower metabolism rates to better conserve declining nutrition. The Southern Resident Killer Whales arrive in the study area in spring after having fed on salmons from early spring spawning on other rivers when their thyroid hormone levels are highest. The hormone levels decline as the animals arrive in the study area, plateau during the time of fish availability and decline further during the period of nutritional scarcity. The toxin analysis was ongoing at the time of publication of research. So far, presence of congeners of the three toxins in whale feces are found to be proportionate to the levels of these chemicals measured in samples of orca flesh during biopsy. The results indicate that restoring the abundance and quality of available prey is an important first measure to restoring orca populations in the area under study.

=== Biodiversity indicator ===
An analysis of feces of two dolphin and one whale species led to the discovery of a new species of Helicobacter, namely Helicobacter cetorum, the bacteria being associated with clinical symptoms and gastritis in the cetaceans.
