= Helicobacter cellulitis =

- Specialty: Dermatology
- Causes: Helicobacter cinaedi

Helicobacter cellulitis is a cutaneous condition caused by Helicobacter cinaedi. H. cinaedi can cause cellulitis and bacteremia in immunocompromised people.

== See also ==
- Cellulitis
- Skin lesion
