= Sulfurovum =

Scientific classification
- Domain: Bacteria
- Kingdom: Pseudomonadati
- Phylum: Campylobacterota
- Class: "Campylobacteria"
- Order: Campylobacterales
- Family: Helicobacteraceae
- Genus: Sulfurovum; Inagaki et al. 2004

Type species
- Sulfurovum lithotrophicum Inagaki et al. 2004

Species
- See text

Genus of bacteria

Sulfurovum is a genus within the Campylobacterota which was first described in 2004 with the isolation and description of the type species Sulfurovum lithotrophicum from Okinawa Trough hydrothermal sediments. Named for their ability to oxidize sulfur and their egg-like shape, cells are gram-negative, coccoid to short rods. Mesophilic chemolithoautotrophic growth occurs by oxidation of sulfur compounds coupled to the reduction of nitrate or molecular oxygen. Multiple strains of the genus are capable of Microbial Sulfur Disproportionation (MSD) of elemental sulfur and thiosulfate.

== Phylogeny ==
The currently accepted taxonomy is based on the List of Prokaryotic names with Standing in Nomenclature (LPSN) and National Center for Biotechnology Information (NCBI).

16S rRNA based LTP_10_2024

- Sulfurovum
  - S. mangrovi Li et al. 2023
  - - - S. aggregans Mino et al. 2014
      - S. denitrificans Mori, Yamaguchi & Hanada 2018
    - - S. indicum Xie et al. 2019
      - - S. lithotrophicum Inagaki et al. 2004
        - S. rifiae Giovannelli et al. 2016

120 marker proteins based GTDB 10-RS226

- Sulfurovum
  - "S. zhangzhouensis" Wang et al. 2023
  - - S. indicum
    - - "S. xiamenensis" Wang et al. 2023
      - - S. lithotrophicum
        - S. rifiae

Unassigned species:

- "Ca. S. kebritense" Alamoudi et al. 2025
- "Ca. S. sediminum" Park et al. 2012
