= Nitratifractor =

Scientific classification
- Domain: Bacteria
- Kingdom: Pseudomonadati
- Phylum: Campylobacterota
- Class: "Campylobacteria"
- Order: Nautiliales
- Family: Nautiliaceae
- Genus: Nitratifractor; Nakagawa et al. 2005
- Species: N. salsuginis

Binomial name
- Nitratifractor salsuginis Nakagawa et al. 2005

Genus of bacteria

Nitratifractor is a genus of bacteria from the order Nautiliales, with one known species, Nitratifractor salsuginis.
