= Thioreductor =

Scientific classification
- Domain: Bacteria
- Kingdom: Pseudomonadati
- Phylum: Campylobacterota
- Class: "Campylobacteria"
- Order: Nautiliales
- Family: Nautiliaceae
- Genus: Thioreductor; Nakagawa et al. 2005
- Species: T. micantisoli

Binomial name
- Thioreductor micantisoli Nakagawa et al. 2005

Genus of bacteria

Thioreductor is a Gram-negative, mesophilic, hydrogen-oxidizing, sulfur-reducing and motile genus of bacteria from the phylum Campylobacterota with one known species, Thioreductor micantisoli. Thioreductor micantisoli has been isolated from hydrothermal sediments from the Iheya North from the Mid-Okinawa Trough in Japan.
