= Pelagic zone =

Water column of the open ocean

Layers of the pelagic zone (scaled)

The pelagic zone consists of the water column of the open ocean and can be further divided into regions by depth. The word pelagic is derived from Ancient Greek πέλαγος (pélagos) 'open sea'. The pelagic zone can be thought of as an imaginary cylinder or water column between the surface of the sea and the bottom.

Conditions in the water column change with depth: pressure increases; temperature and light decrease; salinity, oxygen, micronutrients (such as iron, magnesium and calcium) all change. In a manner analogous to stratification in the Earth's atmosphere, the water column can be divided vertically into up to five different layers (illustrated in the diagram), with the number of layers depending on the depth of the water.

Marine life is affected by bathymetry (underwater topography) such as the seafloor, shoreline, or a submarine seamount, as well as by proximity to the boundary between the ocean and the atmosphere at the ocean surface, which brings light for photosynthesis, predation from above, and wind stirring up waves and setting currents in motion. The pelagic zone refers to the open, free waters away from the shore, where marine life can swim freely in any direction unhindered by topographical constraints.

The oceanic zone is the deep open ocean beyond the continental shelf, which contrasts with the inshore waters near the coast, such as in estuaries or on the continental shelf. Waters in the oceanic zone plunge to the depths of the abyssopelagic and further to the hadopelagic. Coastal waters are generally the relatively shallow epipelagic. Altogether, the pelagic zone occupies 1.33 billion km^{3} (320 million cu mi), with a mean depth of 3.68 km (2.29 mi) and maximum depth of 11 km (6.8 mi). Pelagic life decreases as depth increases.

The pelagic zone also contrasts with the benthic and demersal zones at the bottom of the sea. The benthic zone is the ecological region at the very bottom, including the sediment surface and some subsurface layers. Marine organisms such as clams and crabs living in this zone are called benthos. Just above the benthic zone is the demersal zone. Demersal fish can be divided into benthic fish, which are denser than water and rest on the bottom, and benthopelagic fish, which swim just above the bottom. Demersal fish are also known as bottom feeders and groundfish.

== Depth and layers ==
The pelagic zone is subdivided into five vertical regions. From the top down, these are:

=== Epipelagic (sunlight) ===
The illuminated zone at the surface of the sea, and the only zone with sufficient light for photosynthesis. This zone is just above the continental shelf and has the lowest atmospheric pressure on the oceans surface, at 1 atm for every 10 meters. Nearly all primary production in the ocean occurs here, and about 90% marine life is concentrated in this zone, including: plankton, floating seaweed, jellyfish, tuna, whales, sharks, dolphins, and many more diverse species.

=== Mesopelagic (twilight) ===
The thermocline serves as the boundary from the warmer top zone to the much colder mesopelagic zone, which is also located right under the continental shelf. This zone contains a very trace amount of sunlight and has a pressure of about 20 - 100 atm. A variety of creatures live in this zone, including species of swordfish, squid, wolffish and some species of cuttlefish. Many organisms living here have evolved adaptations, such as bioluminescence, due to the lack of sunlight. Some mesopelagic creatures rise to the epipelagic zone at night to feed. Heterotrophic bacteria are among the more abundant organisms in this zone, and they primarily feed and break down falling matter from the upper zone.

=== Bathypelagic (midnight) ===
The name stems from Ancient Greek βαθύς 'deep'. In this zone, the environment is pitch black at this depth and contains no trace of sunlight, apart from occasional bioluminescent organisms, such as anglerfish. The temperature and salinity of this zone is stable. No plants live here. Most creatures survive on detritus known as "marine snow" falling from the zones above or, like the marine hatchetfish, by preying on other inhabitants of this zone.

=== Abyssopelagic (abyssal zone) ===
The name is derived from Ancient Greek ἄβυσσος 'bottomless'. The ocean floor is next to this zone, and it forms volcanos, mountains, and vents from the movement of the tectonic plates. Among the very few creatures living in the cold temperatures, high pressures and complete darkness there are several species of squid; echinoderms including the basket star, swimming cucumber, and the sea pig; and marine arthropods including the sea spider. Many species at these depths are transparent and eyeless.

=== Hadopelagic (hadal zone) ===
The name is derived from the realm of Hades, the Greek underworld. This is the deepest part of the ocean at more than 6,000 m (20,000 ft) . Such depths are generally located in trenches. This zone contains 13 short narrow troughs and 33 trenches. The deepest trenches stretch to 10,935 m deep (at Challenger Deep, deepest point on earth), while average trenches are usually 5–10 kilometers deep. This zone can have an atmospheric pressure of 1,100 atm. In this zone, there is an increase in temperature from adiabatic heating. Very few creatures live in this zone. Some of the recorded species are coelenterate, polychaetas, amphipods, echinoderms, and mollusks.

== Pelagic ecosystem ==
The pelagic ecosystem is based on phytoplankton. Phytoplankton manufacture their own food using a process of photosynthesis. Because they need sunlight, they inhabit the upper, sunlit epipelagic zone, which includes the coastal or neritic zone. Biodiversity diminishes markedly in the deeper zones below the epipelagic zone as dissolved oxygen diminishes, water pressure increases, temperatures become colder, food sources become scarce, and light diminishes and finally disappears.

=== Pelagic invertebrates ===
Some examples of pelagic invertebrates include krill, copepods, jellyfish, decapod larvae, hyperiid amphipods, rotifers and cladocerans.

Thorson's rule states that benthic marine invertebrates at low latitudes tend to produce large numbers of eggs developing to widely dispersing pelagic larvae, whereas at high latitudes such organisms tend to produce fewer and larger lecithotrophic (yolk-feeding) eggs and larger offspring.

=== Pelagic fish ===
Pelagic fish live in the water column of coastal, ocean, and lake waters, but not on or near the bottom of the sea or the lake. They can be contrasted with demersal fish, which do live on or near the bottom, and coral reef fish.

Pelagic fish are often migratory forage fish, which feed on plankton, and the larger predatory fish that follow and feed on the forage fish. Migratory fish come up to the more dense prey areas of the pelagic zones to feed, and then descend at night to avoid predators. Examples of migratory forage fish are herring, anchovies, capelin, and menhaden. Examples of larger pelagic fish which prey on the forage fish are billfish, tuna, and oceanic sharks.

=== Pelagic reptiles ===
Hydrophis platurus, the yellow-bellied sea snake, is the only one of the 65 species of marine snakes to spend its entire life in the pelagic zone. It bears live young at sea and is helpless on land. The species sometimes forms aggregations of thousands along slicks in surface waters. The yellow-bellied sea snake is the world's most widely distributed snake species.

Many species of sea turtles spend the first years of their lives in the pelagic zone, moving closer to shore as they reach maturity.

=== Pelagic birds ===
Pelagic birds, also called oceanic birds or seabirds, live on open seas and oceans rather than inland or around more restricted waters such as rivers and lakes. Many of these birds have very long wings which give them the ability to fly for long periods of time. Some pelagic birds dive deep into the water to catch prey. Pelagic birds feed on planktonic crustaceans, squid and forage fish. Examples are the Atlantic puffin, macaroni penguins, sooty terns, razorbills, shearwaters, and Procellariiformes such as the albatross, Procellariidae and petrels.

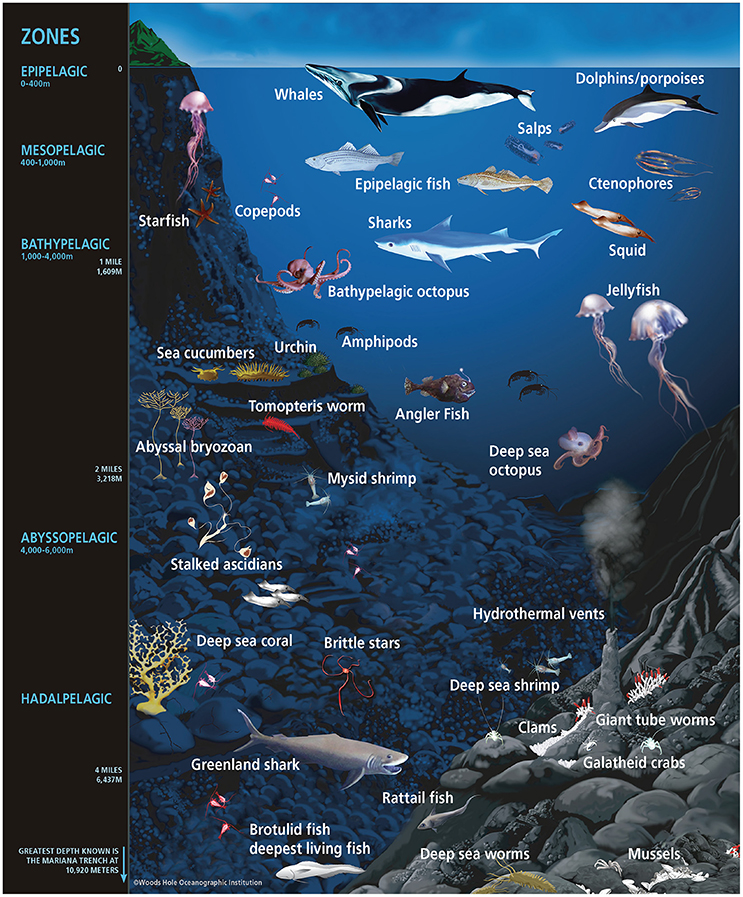
Some representative ocean animals (not drawn to scale) within their approximate depth-defined ecological habitats. Marine microorganisms also exist on the surfaces and within the tissues and organs of the diverse life inhabiting the ocean, across all ocean habitats. The animals rooted to or living on the ocean floor are not pelagic but are benthic animals.

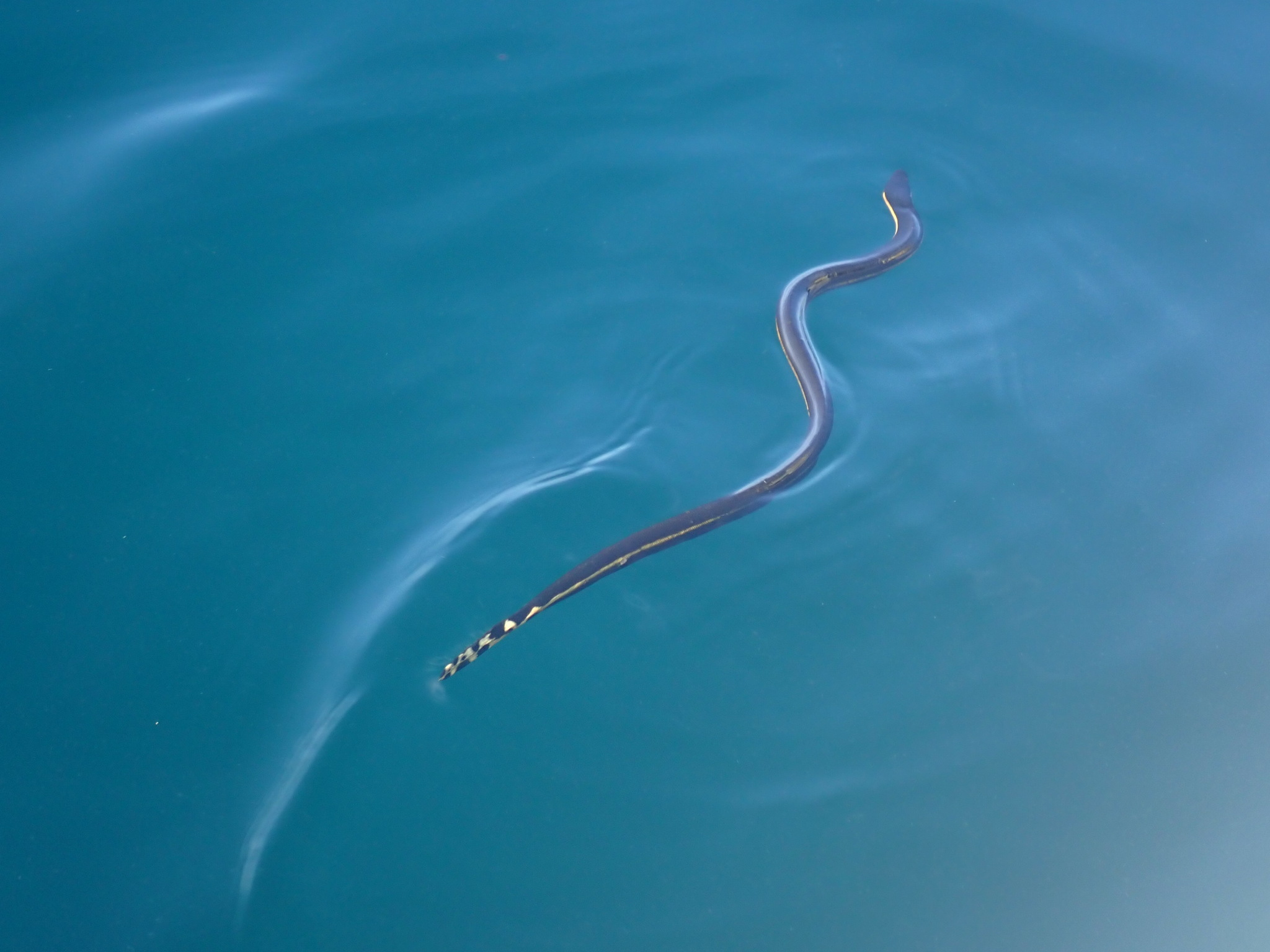
The yellow bellied sea snake as it glides across the surface of the ocean.

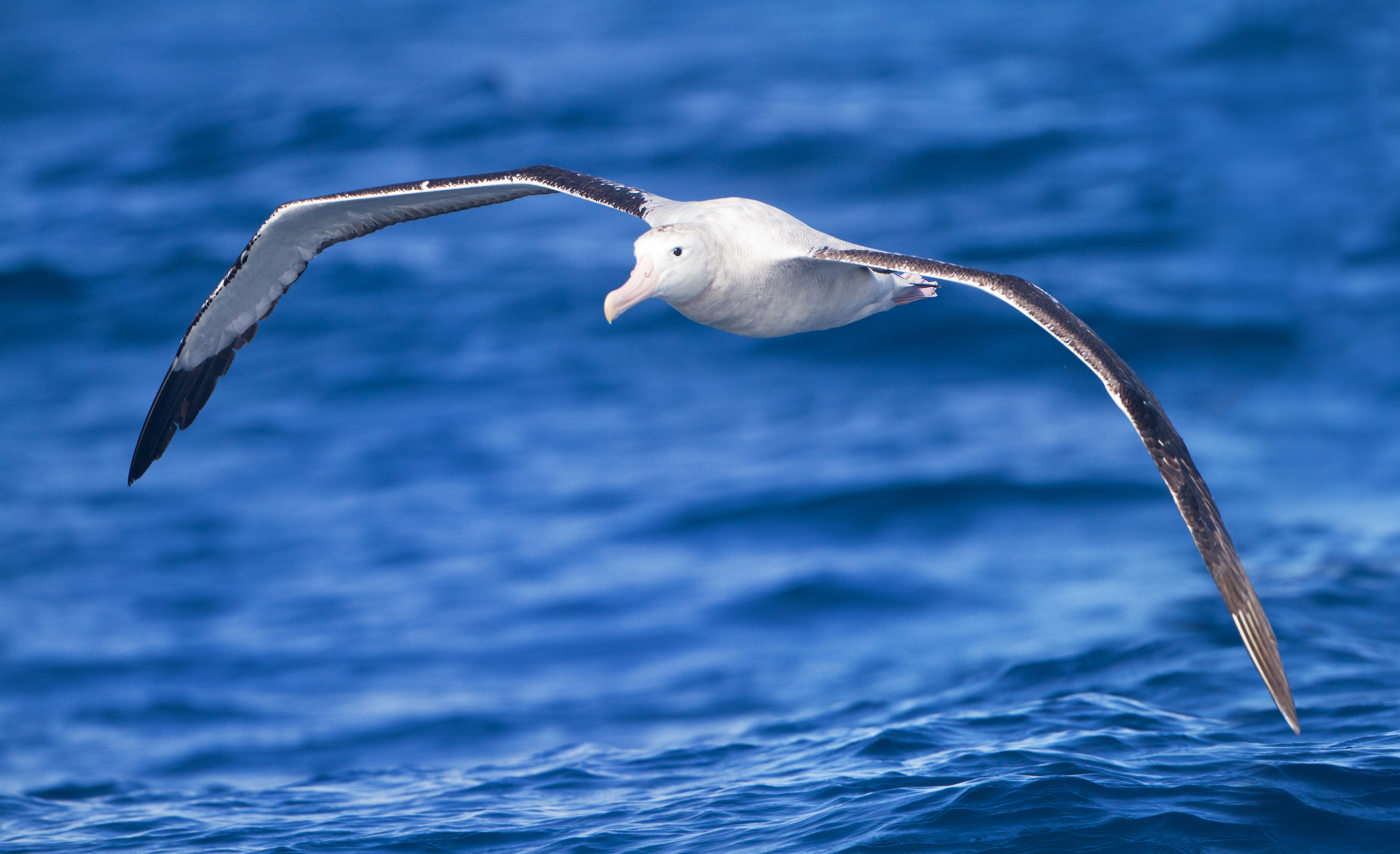
The pelagic wandering albatross (Diomedea exulans) ranges over huge areas of ocean and can circle the globe.

== Food web ==
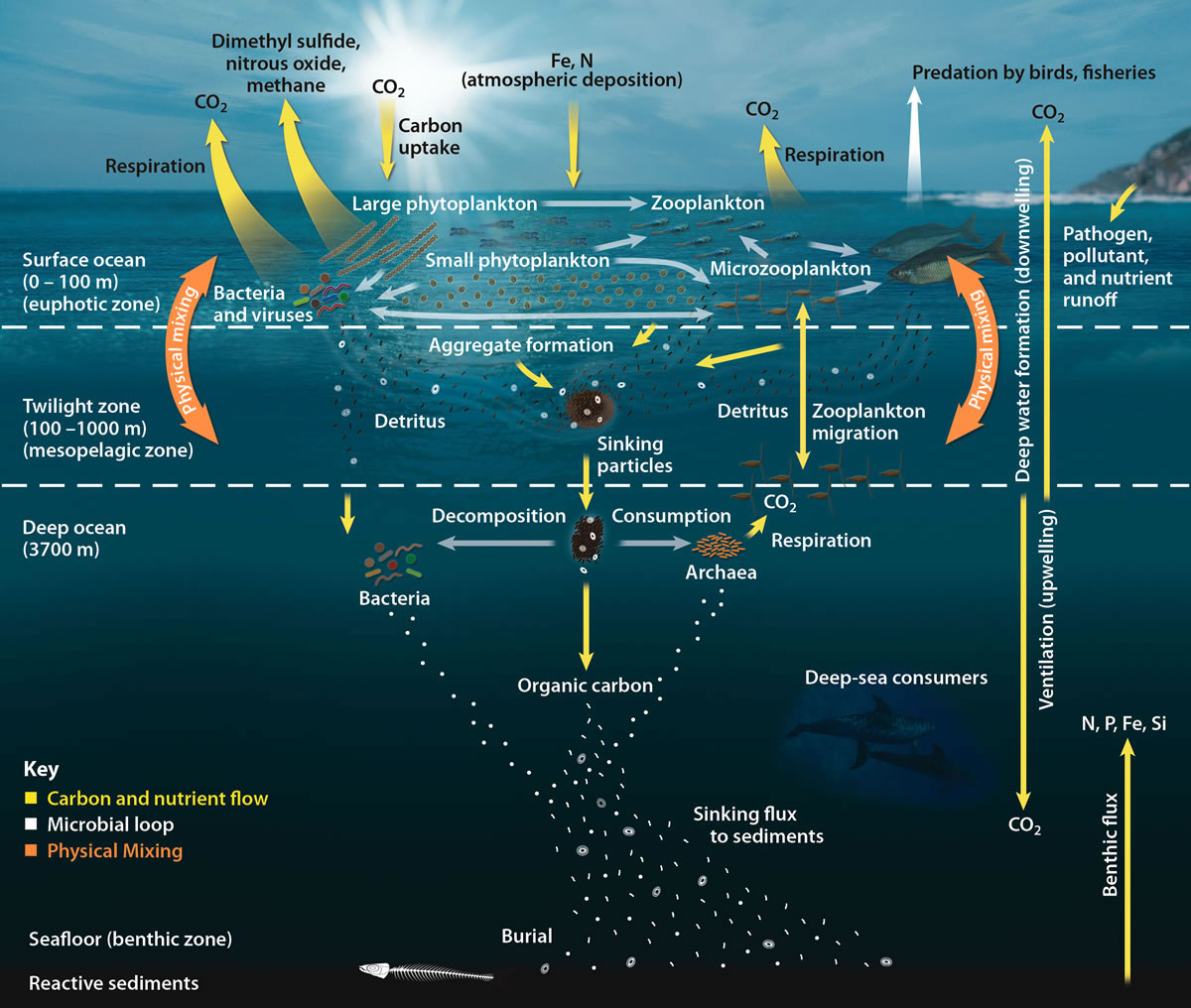
Pelagic food web

Compared to terrestrial environments, marine environments have biomass pyramids which are inverted at the base. In particular, the biomass of consumers (copepods, krill, shrimp, forage fish) is larger than the biomass of primary producers. This happens because the ocean's primary producers are tiny phytoplankton which tend to have a fast life history (are r-strategists that grow and reproduce rapidly) so a small mass can have a fast rate of primary production. In contrast, terrestrial primary producers, such as mature forests, often have a slow life history (are K-strategists that grow and reproduce slowly) so a much larger mass is needed to achieve the same rate of primary production.

Because of this inversion, it is the zooplankton that make up most of the marine animal biomass. As primary consumers, they are the crucial link between the primary producers (mainly (phytoplankton) and the rest of the marine food web (secondary consumers).

If phytoplankton dies before it is eaten, it descends from the euphotic zone down through the pelagic water column as part of the marine snow, and settles into the depths of sea. In this way, phytoplankton sequester about 2 billion tons of carbon dioxide in the ocean each year, causing the ocean to become a sink of carbon dioxide holding about 90% of all sequestered carbon.

In 2010 researchers found whales carry nutrients from the depths of the ocean back up the pelagic water column to the surface using a process they called the whale pump. Whales feed at deeper levels in the ocean where krill is found, but return regularly to the surface to breathe. There whales defecate a liquid rich in nitrogen and iron. Instead of sinking, the liquid stays at the surface where phytoplankton consume it. In the Gulf of Maine the whale pump provides more nitrogen than the rivers.

=== Pelagic Mammals ===
Many Cetaceans, including Narwhals and beluga whales are, pelagic feeders.

== Observing and sampling methods ==
Exploring and learning more about the ocean is a main factor to ocean resource management, which sustainably manages how much and how fast we use the ocean’s resources. Ocean exploration also observes patterns in the ocean’s weather and climate, and the means by which they were affected. With this data, researchers are better able to understand and see natural phenomena such as earthquakes and tsunamis and react accordingly. Scientists and researchers have developed many methods to sample the ocean biome and pelagic fish.

=== Trawling ===
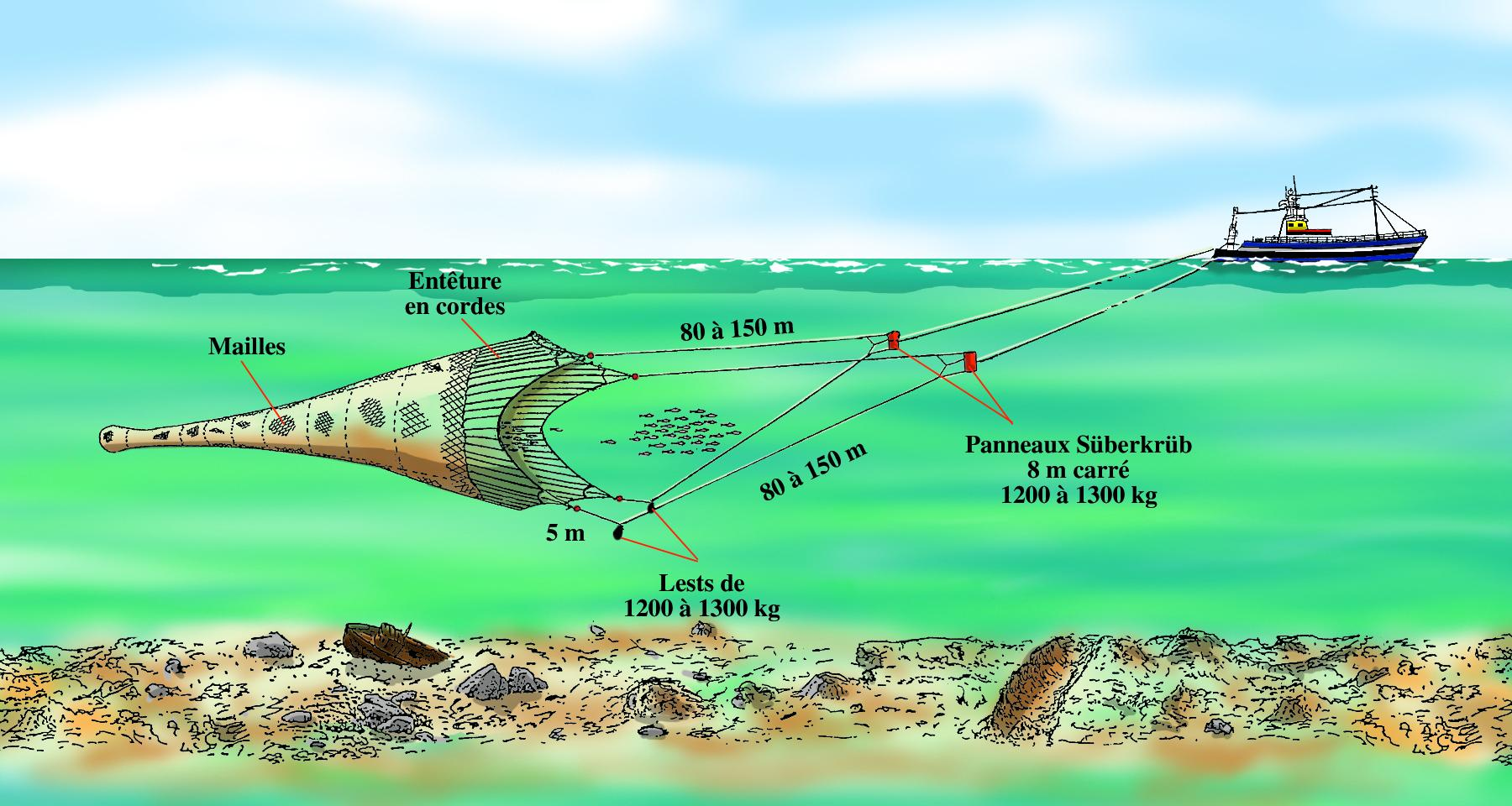
Pelagic fish being captured with a pelagic trawing net

This method can be used from a boat to capture organisms like deep pelagic fish. A mesh net is dragged at different depths to collect for recording the captured organisms. This method can produce large amounts of specimen. However it is costly, time consuming, and mostly used by research groups with a lot of support and funding. There are also many fish that are able to out swim the net, which limits data.

=== Active acoustics ===
This method analyzes fish that are detected by sound pulses that are emitted from the surface, where the pelagic fish's biomass in the reflected signal is analyzed. This method of sampling cannot reach deep depths in the ocean. The pulses cover a broad area of the ocean and cause little harm or distress. The received data from this method is complicated to interpret due to specific variations of swim bladders in fish, such as having little gas or not having a swim bladder.

=== Remotely operated vehicles ===
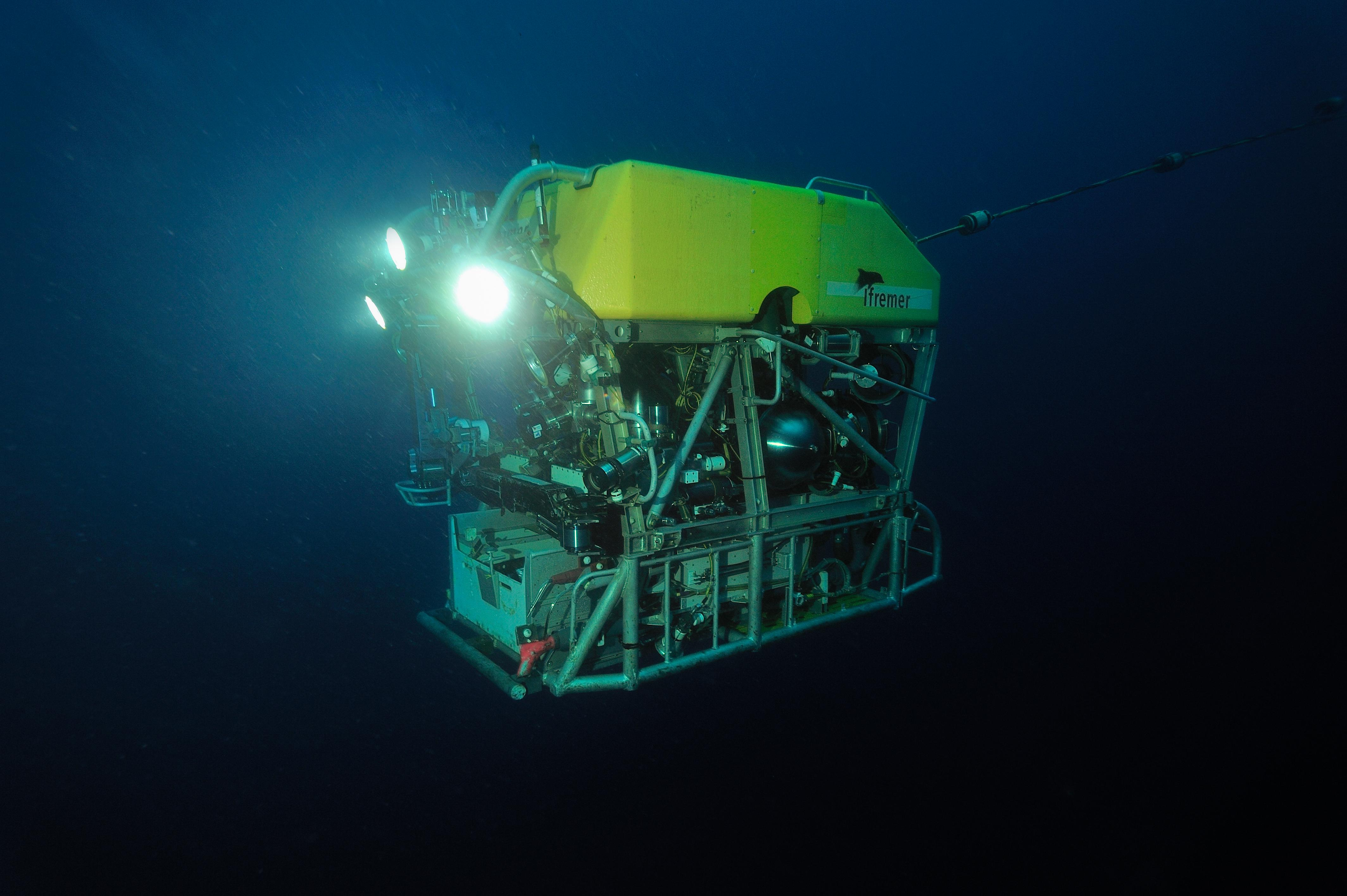
An ROV immersed in pelagic waters observing the pelagic world

Remotely operated vehicles (ROVs) are used for sampling and examining the deep pelagic sea in ways that other techniques cannot match. An ROV is an unoccupied machine equipped with lights, cameras, sensors, or arms, which allows for detailed and live observations of its surroundings and of pelagic organisms. It can conduct experiments and collect samples. These machine are limited in ground coverage, as well as expensive and hard to control, so few research groups use them. They can also be loud, bright, and big, causing organisms to avoid them.

=== Additional methods ===
Some other sampling and observation methods are: predator gut examinations, analysis of environmental DNA, organisms that get washed up on shore from upwelling, analyzing sediments cores, and pelagic longline fishing.
