= Helicobacter hepaticus =

Scientific classification
- Domain: Bacteria
- Kingdom: Pseudomonadati
- Phylum: Campylobacterota
- Class: "Campylobacteria"
- Order: Campylobacterales
- Family: Helicobacteraceae
- Genus: Helicobacter
- Species: H. hepaticus

Binomial name
- Helicobacter hepaticus Fox et al., 1994

Species of bacterium

Helicobacter hepaticus is a bacterium in the Helicobacteraceae family, Campylobacterales order.

It has a spiral shape and bipolar, single, sheathed flagellum. The bacterium was first isolated from the livers of mice with active, chronic hepatitis. Other organs the bacterium colonize include the cecal and colonic mucosae of mice. It elicits persistent hepatitis in mice and has been associated with colorectal cancer and other diseases. Its genome has been sequenced and is 1,799,146 bases long with 1,875 coding sequences.
