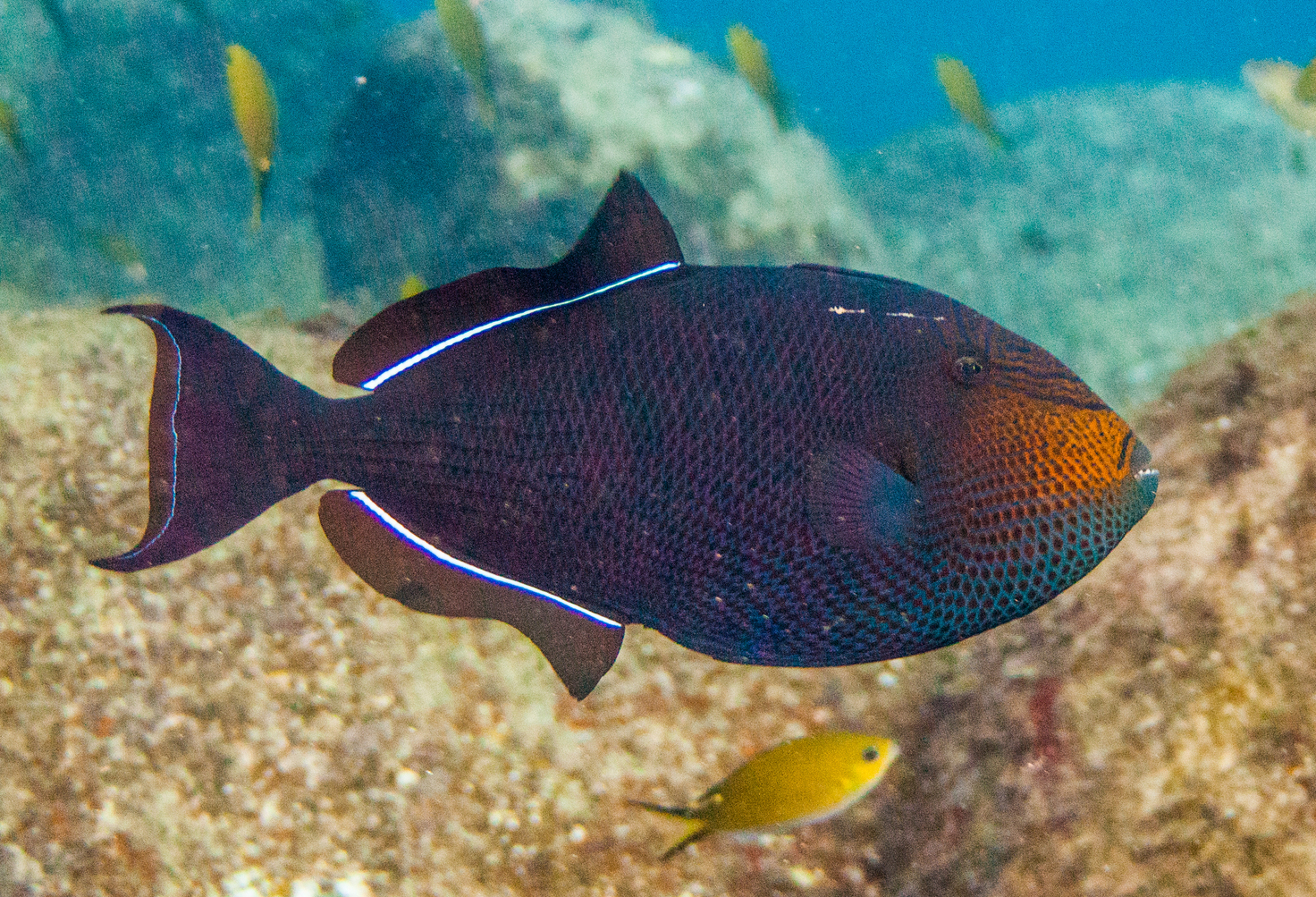

Conservation status
- Least Concern (IUCN 3.1)

Scientific classification
- Kingdom: Animalia
- Phylum: Chordata
- Class: Actinopterygii
- Division: Teleostei
- Order: Tetraodontiformes
- Family: Balistidae
- Genus: Melichthys
- Species: M. niger

Binomial name
- Melichthys niger (Bloch, 1786)

= Black triggerfish =

Species of fish

The black triggerfish or black durgon (Melichthys niger), called Humuhumu'ele'ele in Hawaiian, is a blimp-shaped triggerfish with bright white lines running along its dorsal and anal fins. From distance, it appears to be completely black. However, upon closer inspection with good lighting, one can see that it is actually mottled dark-blue/green coloration often with orange toward the front of the head. Black durgons are capable of changing color based on their surroundings.

These are not to be confused with their cousins, the Indian triggerfish or black-finned triggerfish (Melichthys indicus), which are often mistaken as being black triggerfish within the aquarium trade. The Indian triggerfish has never been found near Hawaii, but bears a striking resemblance to the black triggerfish because of the similar shape and coloration.

== Distribution and habitat ==
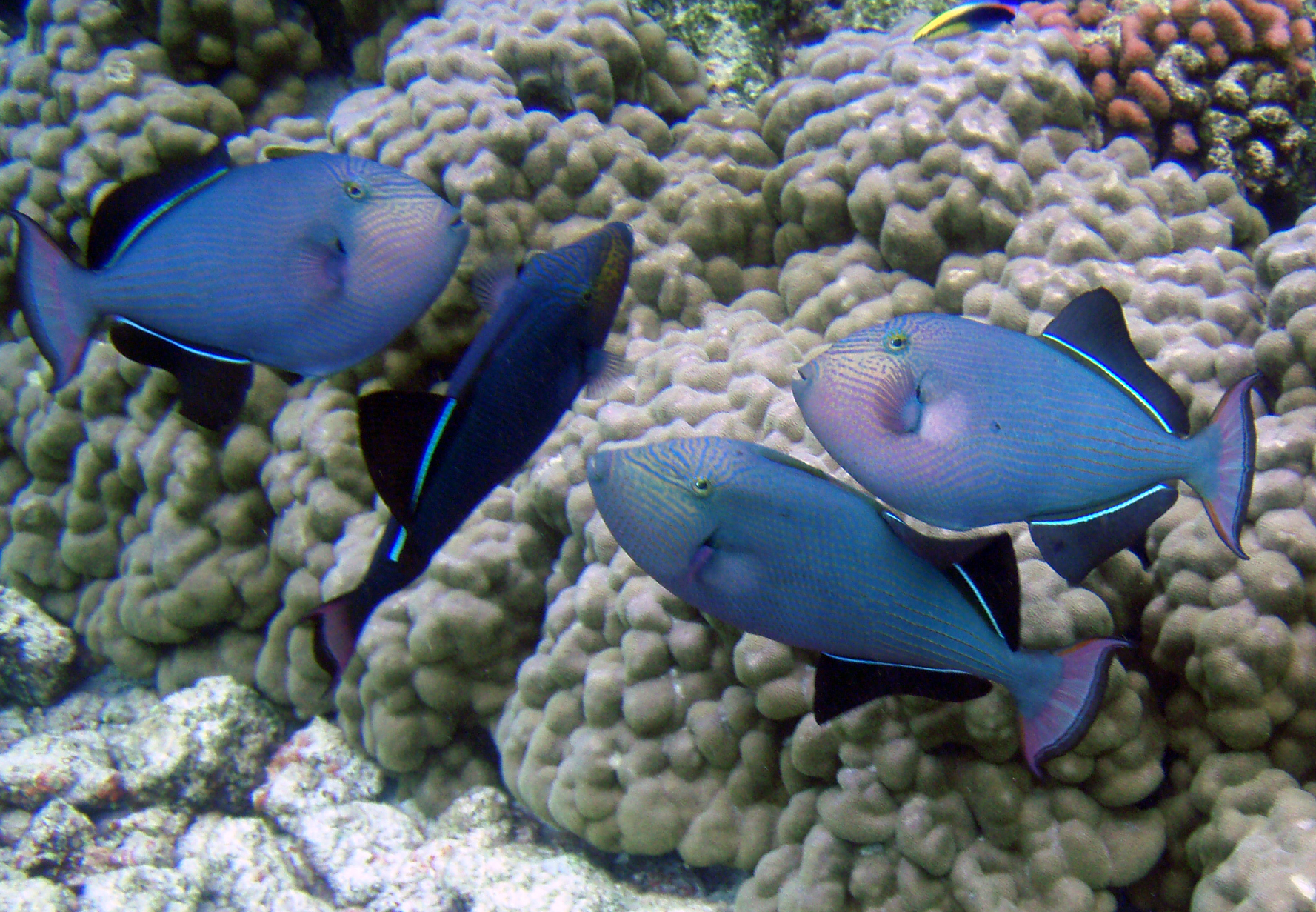
In Hawaii

Circumtropical. Hawaii, up through Polynesia, westward to the East Indies and across the Indian Ocean. The black triggerfish is also located around the southern coast of Africa.

Although, the black triggerfish is commonly found in the Indo Pacific and Red Sea.

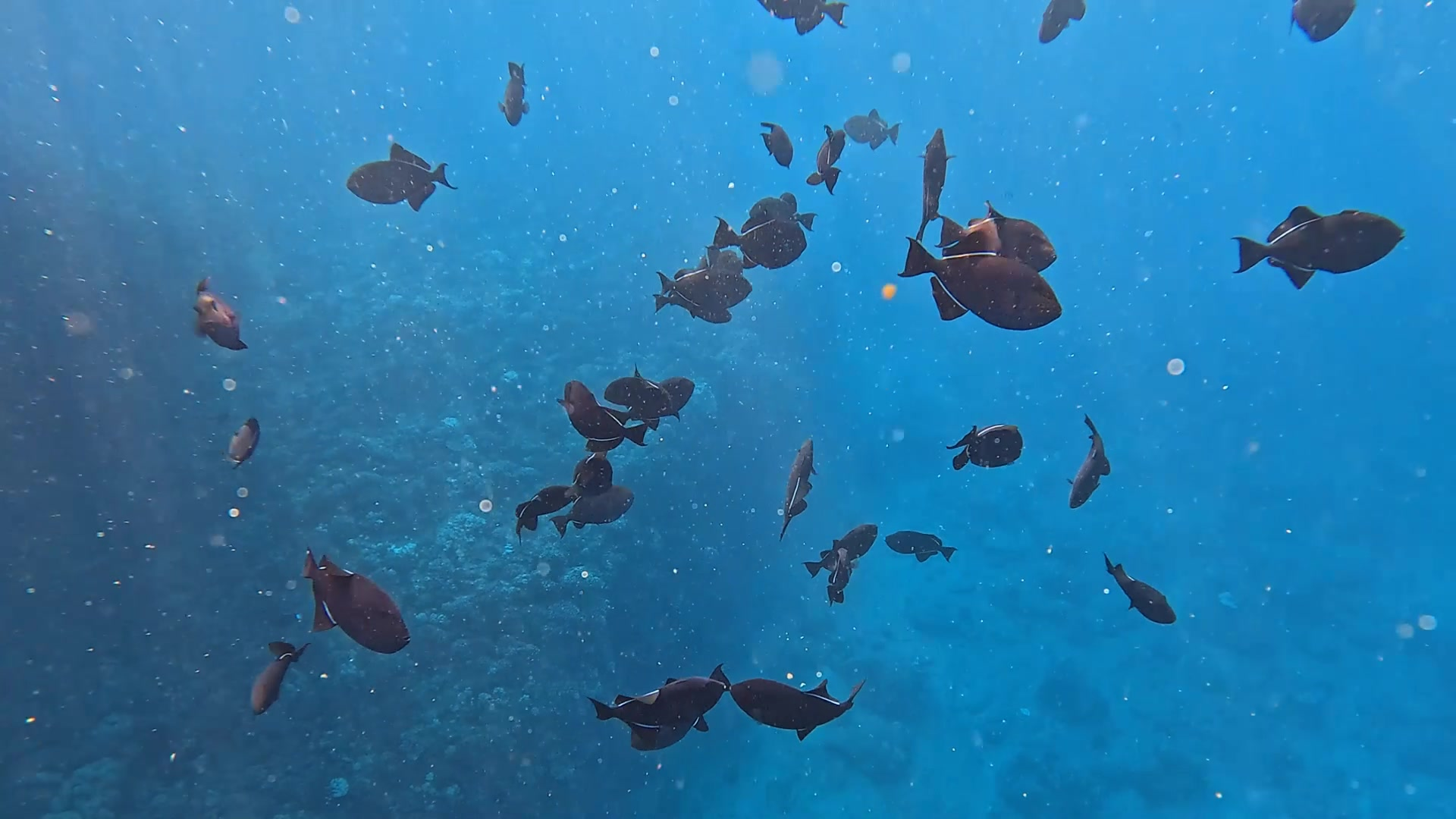
Shoal of black triggerfish off the coast of Kaumakani, Kauai

This species is found in open waters, shallows, and exposed reefs, 5–35 metres (15–115 feet) Seems to prefer inland/shores in the Ascension Island region where they are strangely prolific.

== Size ==
On average, 12 inches, although it can grow to be up to 18 inches.

== Diet ==
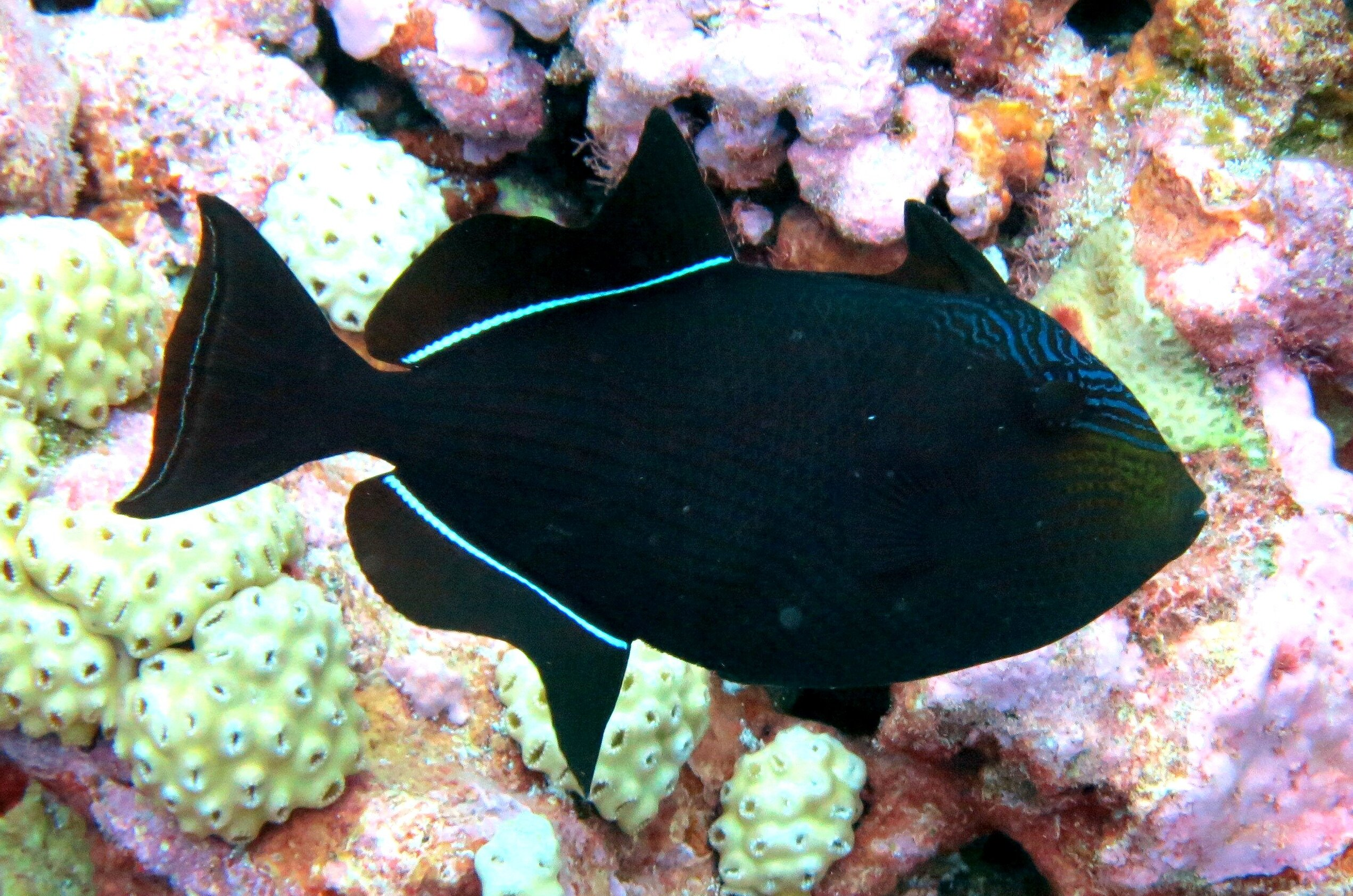
With extended dorsal spine, on Kingman Reef

Omnivorous. Feeds upon small fish and squid. Shrimp, zooplankton, algae, and other marine plant life.

A study conducted in the Fernando de Noronha Archipelago of the southwest Atlantic Ocean, revealed the feces and vomit of Spinner dolphins (Stenella longirostris) formed part of the diet of twelve species of reef fish from seven different families. The most prolific consumer was the black male, which could even discern the postures dolphins assumed prior to voiding and positioned themselves for effective feeding. All these offal eating fish species are recorded plankton eaters and it is considered that this type of feeding may represent a change in its usual diet, i.e. drifting plankton.

== See also ==
- Triggerfish
