= Wolinella =

Scientific classification
- Domain: Bacteria
- Kingdom: Pseudomonadati
- Phylum: Campylobacterota
- Class: "Campylobacteria"
- Order: Campylobacterales
- Family: Helicobacteraceae
- Genus: Wolinella; Tanner et al. 1981

Type species
- Wolinella succinogenes (Wolin et al. 1961) Tanner et al. 1981

Species
- "Ca. W. africana"; W. succinogenes

Genus of bacteria

The genus Wolinella is a member of the Campylobacterales order of Bacteria. The order Campylobacterales includes human pathogens such as Helicobacter pylori and Campylobacter jejuni.

== Strains ==
The only publicly available strain of Wolinella is Wolinella succinogenes DSM 1740 (ATCC 29543). The original isolation of this organism was done by M. J. Wolin, E. A. Wolin and N. J. Jacobs at the University of Illinois. This original isolation was done from bovine rumen fluid and was somewhat serendipitous as the researchers were intending to isolate methanogenic organisms. This bacterium was originally classified as Vibrio succinogenes, but was reclassified in 1981 to Wolinella succinogenes by A. C. R. Tanner et al.

Strains of Wolinella have been isolated from feline and canine oral cavities. Only one strain is currently published with Candidatus status: Candidatus Wolinella africanus. This strain was isolated from the upper digestive tracts of a Venezuelan volunteer.

== Characteristics ==
Wolinella species are Gram-negative.

=== Metabolism ===
Some of the research done on Wolinella succinogenes includes its mutualistic relationship with hydrogen-producing organisms, including Ruminococcus albus. Their relationship is based on interspecies hydrogen transfer. Wolinella succinogenes molecular hydrogen using a fumarate reductase, producing succinate.

== See also ==
- List of bacterial orders
- List of bacteria genera
