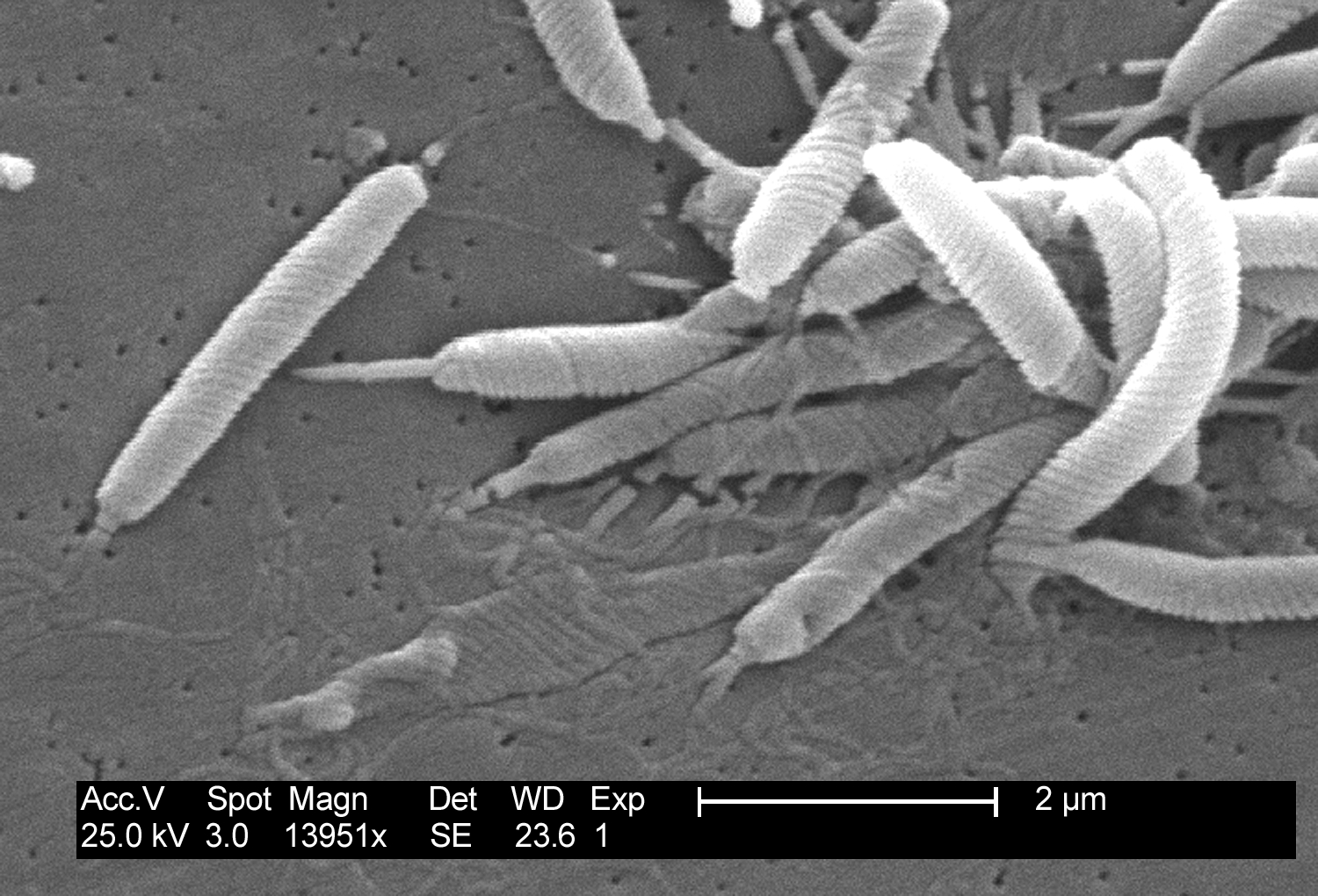
- Scanning electron micrograph of Helicobacter bilis bacteria

Scientific classification
- Domain: Bacteria
- Kingdom: Pseudomonadati
- Phylum: Campylobacterota
- Class: "Campylobacteria"
- Order: Campylobacterales
- Family: Helicobacteraceae
- Genus: Helicobacter; Goodwin et al. 1989

Type species
- Helicobacter pylori (Marshall et al. 1985) Goodwin et al. 1989

Species
- See text

Synonyms
- "Gastrospirillum" McNulty et al. 1989

= Helicobacter =

Genus of bacteria

Helicobacter is a genus of gram-negative bacteria possessing a characteristic helical shape. They were initially considered to be members of the genus Campylobacter, but in 1989, Goodwin et al. published sufficient reasons to justify the new genus name Helicobacter. The genus Helicobacter contains about 35 species.

Some species have been found living in the lining of the upper gastrointestinal tract, as well as the liver of mammals and some birds. The most widely known species of the genus is H. pylori, which infects up to 50% of the human population. It also serves as the type species of the genus. Some strains of this bacterium are pathogenic to humans, as they are strongly associated with peptic ulcers, chronic gastritis, duodenitis, and stomach cancer.

Helicobacter species are able to thrive in the very acidic mammalian stomach by producing large quantities of the enzyme urease, which locally raises the pH from about 2 to a more biocompatible range of 6 to 7. Bacteria belonging to this genus are usually susceptible to antibiotics such as penicillin, are microaerophilic (optimal oxygen concentration between 5 and 14%) capnophiles, and are fast-moving with their flagella.

== Molecular signatures ==
Comparative genomic analysis has led to the identification of 11 proteins that are uniquely found in the Helicobacteraceae. Of these proteins, seven are found in all species of the family, while the remaining four are not found in any Helicobacter strains and are unique to Wollinella. Additionally, a rare genetic event has led to the fusion of the rpoB and rpoC genes in this family, which is characteristic of them.

== Non-H. pylori species ==
Recently, new gastric (H. suis and H. baculiformis) and enterohepatic (H. equorum) species have been reported. H. pylori is of primary importance for medicine, but non-H. pylori species, which naturally inhabit mammals (except humans) and birds, have been detected in human clinical specimens. These encompass two (gastric and enterohepatic) groups, showing different organ specificity. Importantly, some species, such as H. hepaticus, H. mustelae, and probably H. bilis, exhibit carcinogenic potential in animals. They harbour many virulence genes and may cause diseases not only in animals, but also in humans. Gastric species such as H. suis (most often), H. felis, H. bizzozeronii, and H. salomonis have been associated with chronic gastritis and peptic ulcers in humans, and importantly, with higher risk for MALT lymphoma compared to H. pylori.

Enterohepatic species e.g., H. hepaticus, H. bilis, and H. ganmani, have been detected by PCR, but still are not isolated from specimens of patients with hepatobiliary diseases. Moreover, they may be associated with Crohn's disease and ulcerative colitis. The significance of avian helicobacters (H. pullorum, H. anseris, and H. brantae) also has been evaluated extensively. H. cinaedi and H. canis can cause severe infections, mostly in immunocompromised patients with animal exposure. Briefly, the role of these species in veterinary and human medicine is increasingly recognised. Several other topics such as isolation of still uncultured species, antibiotic resistance, and treatment regimens for infections and pathogenesis and possible carcinogenesis in humans should be evaluated.

=== H. heilmannii sensu lato ===
Helicobacter heilmannii sensu lato (i.e. H. heilmanni s.l.) is a grouping of non-H. pylori Helicobacter species that take as part of their definition a similarity to H. pylori in being associated with the development of stomach inflammation, stomach ulcers, duodenum ulcers, stomach cancers that are not lymphomas, and extranodal marginal B cell lymphoma of the stomach in humans and animals. Most clinical studies have not identified the exact species of H. heilmanii associated with these diseases, so designated these species as H. heilmanni s.l. However, investigative studies have identified these species in some patients with the cited H. heilmanni s.l.-associated upper gastrointestinal tract diseases. The H. heilmani species identified to date in the stomachs of humans with the cited upper gastrointestinal tract diseases are: Helicobacter bizzozeronii, Helicobacter felis, Helicobacter salomonis, Helicobacter suis, and Helicobacter heilmannii s.s. It is important to recognize the association of H. heilmannii sensu lato with these upper gastrointestinal tract diseases, particularly extranodal marginal zone lymphoma of the stomach, because some of them have been successfully treated using antibiotic-based drug regimens directed against the instigating H. heilmannii sensu lato species. The H. heilmanni s.l.-associated human diseases appear to be acquired from pets and farm animals, so are considered to be zoonotic diseases.

== Phylogeny ==
The currently accepted taxonomy is based on the List of Prokaryotic names with Standing in Nomenclature (LPSN) and National Center for Biotechnology Information (NCBI).

16S rRNA based LTP_10_2024

- - Wolinella
  - - Helicobacter
      - - H. anseris
        - - H. anatolicus
          - H. mustelae
      - - - H. kayseriensis
          - - H. pametensis
            - - H. brantae
              - H. cholecystus
        - - - H. valdiviensis
            - - H. turcicus
              - - H. ibis
                - - H. ganmani
                  - - H. mesocricetorum
                    - H. rodentium Shen et al. 1997
          - - - - - H. equorum Moyaert et al. 2007
                  - H. kumamotonensis Kawamura et al. 2023
                - - H. pullorum Stanley et al. 1995
                  - - H. canadensis Fox et al. 2002
                    - H. colisuis
              - - - - H. acinonychis
                    - H. pylori
                  - - H. cetorum
                    - H. delphinicola Segawa et al. 2021
                - - H. suis
                  - - H. labacensis
                    - - - - H. bizzozeronii
                          - H. cynogastricus
                        - - H. felis
                          - H. salomonis
                      - - H. heilmannii
                        - - H. vulpis
                          - - H. mehlei
                            - - H. ailurogastricus
                              - H. baculiformis
            - - - - H. apri Zanoni et al. 2016
                  - H. mastomyrinus
                - - H. himalayensis
                  - - - H. didelphidarum
                      - H. monodelphidis Shen et al. 2020
                    - - - H. macacae
                        - H. marmotae
                      - - H. jaachi
                        - H. saguini
              - - - H. aurati
                  - - H. fennelliae
                    - H. trogontum
                - - H. enhydrae
                  - - - H. hepaticus
                      - - H. typhlonius
                        - - H. japonicus
                          - H. muridarum
                    - - H. canis
                      - - H. bilis
                        - - H. canicola Kawamura et al. 2016
                          - H. cinaedi

120 marker proteins based GTDB 10-RS226

- - - Wolinella
    - - Pseudohelicobacter
        - - "Helicobacter burdigaliensis" Berthenet et al. 2019
          - Helicobacter valdiviensis Collado, Jara & Gonzalez 2014
        - - Helicobacter ibis Lopez-Cantillo et al. 2023
          - - - - Helicobacter turcicus Aydin et al. 2022
                - "Helicobacter winghamensis" Melito et al. 2001
              - - Helicobacter ganmani Robertson et al. 2001
                - "P. rodentium" (Shen et al. 1997) Waite, Chuvochina & Hugenholtz 2019
            - - - Helicobacter apodemus Jeon et al. 2015
                - Helicobacter mesocricetorum Simmons et al. 2000
              - - "P. pullorum" (Stanley et al. 1995) Waite, Chuvochina & Hugenholtz 2019
                - - "P. canadensis" (Fox et al. 2002) Waite, Chuvochina & Hugenholtz 2019
                  - Helicobacter colisuis Gruntar et al. 2022
  - - Helicobacter
      - - - H. aurati Patterson et al. 2002
          - H. muridarum Lee et al. 1992
        - - - H. didelphidarum Shen et al. 2020
            - H. saguini Shen et al. 2017
          - - H. trogontum Mendes et al. 1996
            - - H. bilis Fox et al. 1997
              - "H. rappini" Dewhirst et al. 2000
      - - - - - H. enhydrae Shen et al. 2020
              - - H. kayseriensis Aydin et al. 2022
                - H. pametensis Dewhirst et al. 1994
            - - H. brantae Fox et al. 2006
              - - "Ca. H. avistercoris" Gilroy et al. 2021
                - H. cholecystus Franklin et al. 1997
          - - - - "Ca. H. avicola" Gilroy et al. 2021
                - H. himalayensis Hu et al. 2015
              - - H. jaachi Shen et al. 2017
                - - - "H. labetoulli" Berthenet et al. 2019
                    - - H. cinaedi (Totten et al. 1988) Vandamme et al. 1991
                      - "H. magdeburgensis" Traverso et al. 2010
                  - - H. hepaticus Fox et al. 1994
                    - - - H. marmotae Fox et al. 2006
                        - H. mastomyrinus Shen et al. 2006
                      - - H. japonicus corrig. Shen et al. 2017
                        - H. typhlonius Franklin et al. 2002
        - - - H. anseris Fox et al. 2006
            - - H. anatolicus Aydin et al. 2023
              - H. mustelae (Fox et al. 1988) Goodwin et al. 1989
          - - - H. fennelliae (Totten et al. 1988) Vandamme et al. 1991
              - - H. canis Stanley et al. 1994
                - H. macacae Fox et al. 2013
            - - - H. cetorum Harper et al. 2006
                - - H. acinonychis corrig. Eaton et al. 1993
                  - H. pylori (Marshall et al. 1985) Goodwin et al. 1989
              - - - H. suis Baele et al. 2008
                  - - H. ailurogastricus Joosten et al. 2017
                    - H. heilmannii Smet et al. 2012
                - - - H. bizzozeronii Hanninen et al. 1996
                    - H. mehlei Gruntar et al. 2020
                  - - - H. cynogastricus Van den Bulck et al. 2006
                      - H. felis Paster et al. 1991
                    - - H. salomonis Jalava et al. 1997
                      - - H. labacensis Gruntar et al. 2020
                        - - H. baculiformis Baele et al. 2008
                          - H. vulpis Gruntar et al. 2020

Species incertae sedis:

- "Ca. H. bovis" De Groote et al. 1999
- "H. callitrichis" Won et al. 2007
- H. cappadocius Aydin et al. 2025
- "Ca. H. cebus" Gueneau de Novoa et al. 2001a
- "H. felistomachi" Rimbara et al. 2025
- "H. gastrocanis" Rimbara et al. 2025
- "H. gastrofelis" Rimbara et al. 2025
- "H. higonensis" Tomida et al. 2024
- "H. muricola" Won et al. 2002
- "H. peregrinus" Coldham et al. 2004
- "H. suncus" Goto et al. 1998
- "H. tursiopsae" Gueneau de Novoa et al. 2001b
- "H. vulpecula" Coldham et al. 2004
