= Nautiliaceae =

Scientific classification
- Domain: Bacteria
- Kingdom: Pseudomonadati
- Phylum: Campylobacterota
- Class: "Campylobacteria"
- Order: Nautiliales; Miroshnichenko et al. 2004
- Family: Nautiliaceae; Miroshnichenko et al. 2004

Genera
- Caminibacter; Cetia; Lebetimonas; Nautilia; Nitratifractor; Thioreductor

Family of bacteria

The Nautiliaceae are a family of gram-negative bacteria placed in an order to itself, Nautiliales. The members of the family are all thermophilic.

== Phylogeny ==
The currently accepted taxonomy is based on the List of Prokaryotic names with Standing in Nomenclature (LPSN) and National Center for Biotechnology Information (NCBI).

16S rRNA based LTP_10_2024

- - Nautilia Miroshnichenko et al. 2002
  - - Lebetimonas acidiphila Takai et al. 2005 (type sp.)
    - - Lebetimonas natsushimae Nagata et al. 2017
      - - Cetia Grosche et al. 2015
        - Caminibacter Alain et al. 2002

120 marker proteins based GTDB 10-RS226

- - Lebetimonas
  - - Nautilia
    - Caminibacter [incl. Cetia]
