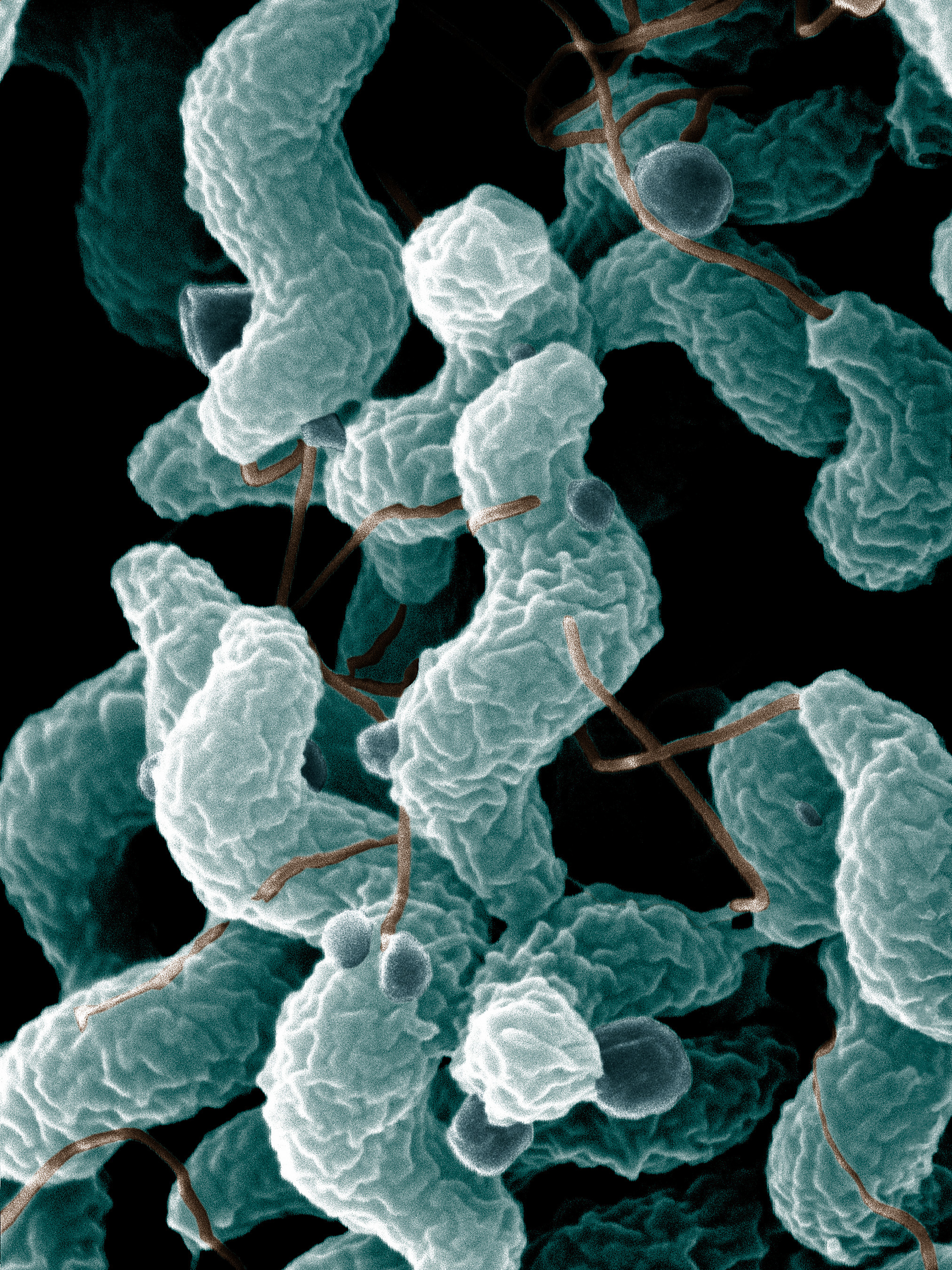
- Campylobacter jejuni bacteria

Scientific classification
- Domain: Bacteria
- Kingdom: Pseudomonadati
- Phylum: Campylobacterota
- Class: "Campylobacteria"; Waite et al. 2017
- Order: Campylobacterales; Garrity et al. 2006

Families
- Arcobacteraceae; Campylobacteraceae; Helicobacteraceae; Hydrogenimonadaceae; Nitratiruptoraceae; Sulfurimonadaceae; Sulfurospirillaceae; Sulfurovaceae; "Thiobarbaceae"; Thiovulaceae

= Campylobacterales =

Order of bacteria

The Campylobacterales are an order of Campylobacterota which make up the epsilon subdivision, together with the small family Nautiliaceae. They are Gram-negative. Most of the species are microaerophilic.

== Molecular signatures ==
Comparative genomic analysis has led to the identification of 49 proteins which are uniquely found in virtually all species of the order Campylobacterales. Additionally, two conserved signature indels have been identified which, along with the proteins, serve as molecular markers for the order. The indels are a three-amino-acid insertion in the B protein of the Uvr ABC system, and a two-amino-acid deletion in phenylalanyl-tRNA synthetase.

== Phylogeny ==
The currently accepted taxonomy is based on the List of Prokaryotic names with Standing in Nomenclature (LPSN) and National Center for Biotechnology Information (NCBI).

16S rRNA based LTP_10_2024

- - - Nitratiruptoraceae
      - Nitratiruptor
      - Nitrosophilus
  - - - Hydrogenimonadaceae
        Hydrogenimonas
    - - - Thioreductoraceae
          Thioreductor
      - - - Helicobacteraceae
            - Wolinella
            - Helicobacter [incl. "Pseudohelicobacter"]
        - - - Sulfurovaceae
              - Nitratifractor
              - Sulfurovum
            - Sulfurimonadaceae
              - Sulfuricurvum
              - Sulfurimonas
          - - - Sulfurospirillaceae
                Sulfurospirillum
            - - Campylobacteraceae
                Campylobacter
              - Arcobacteraceae
                - Poseidonibacter
                - - Malaciobacter
                  - - Arcobacter
                    - - Aliarcobacter species-group 2
                      - - Halarcobacter
                        - Aliarcobacter

120 marker proteins based GTDB 10-RS226

- - - - Thiovulaceae
        Thiovulum
      - Sulfurimonadaceae
        - Sulfuricurvum
        - Sulfurimonas
    - - - Nitratiruptoraceae
          - Nitrosophilus alvini
          - - Nitrosophilus_A
            - Nitratiruptor
      - - Hydrogenimonadaceae
          Hydrogenimonas
        - Sulfurovaceae
          - Nitratifractor
          - Sulfurovum
  - - - Helicobacteraceae
        - - Wolinella
          - "Pseudohelicobacter"
        - Helicobacter
    - - - Arcobacteraceae
          - "Ca. Marinarcus"
          - - Malaciobacter
            - - Arcobacter
              - - Halarcobacter
                - - - Arcobacter roscoffensis
                    - Poseidonibacter
                  - - Malaciobacter pacificus
                    - Aliarcobacter
      - - - Sulfurospirillaceae
            Sulfurospirillum
        - - UBA1877
            Sulfurospirillum_B
          - Campylobacteraceae
            Campylobacter

Unassigned genera:

- "Flexispira" Bryner 1987
- "Candidatus Thioturbo" Muyzer et al. 2005
- "Thiofractor" Makita et al. 2012
- "Thiobarbaceae" Assié et al. 2020
  - "Candidatus Thiobarba" Assié et al. 2020

== See also ==
- List of bacterial orders
- List of bacteria genera
