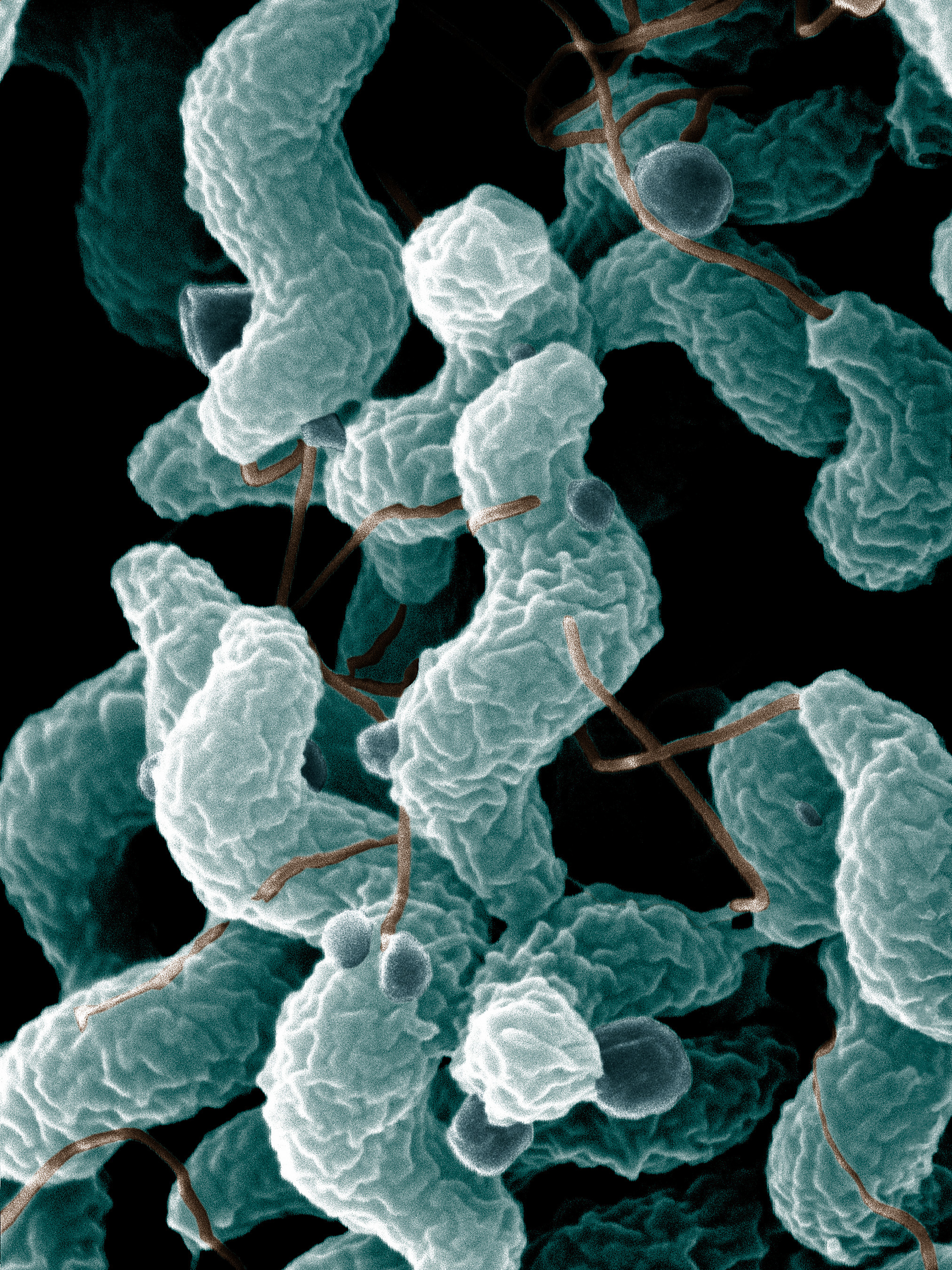
- Campylobacter jejuni bacteria

Scientific classification
- Domain: Bacteria
- Kingdom: Pseudomonadati
- Phylum: Campylobacterota
- Class: "Campylobacteria"; Waite et al. 2017

Orders
- Campylobacterales; Nautiliales

Synonyms
- "Epsilobacteria" Cavalier-Smith 2002; Epsilonproteobacteria Garrity et al. 2006; "Nautiliia" Cavalier-Smith 2020

= Campylobacteria =

Order of bacteria

The Campylobacteria are a class of Gram-negative bacteria. It used to be known as Epsilonproteobacteria. (Note: By taxonomic rules, the old "Epsilonproteobacteria" should be preferred and the newer name treated as a later synonym. The proposed name does have the effect of solidifying the class's removal from Proteobacteria.) Only a few genera have been characterized, including the curved to spirilloid Wolinella, Helicobacter, and Campylobacter.

Most of the known species inhabit the digestive tracts of animals and serve as symbionts (Wolinella spp. in cattle) or pathogens (Helicobacter spp. in the stomach, Campylobacter spp. in the duodenum). However, numerous environmental sequences and isolates of Campylobacteria have been recovered from hydrothermal vents and cold seep habitats. Examples of isolates include Sulfurimonas autotrophica, Sulfurimonas paralvinellae, Sulfurovum lithotrophicum and Nautilia profundicola. A member of the phylum Campylobacterota occurs as an endosymbiont in the large gills of the deepwater sea snail Alviniconcha hessleri.

Many Campylobacteria are motile with flagella. The Campylobacteria found at deep-sea hydrothermal vents characteristically exhibit chemolithotrophy, meeting their energy needs by oxidizing reduced sulfur, formate, or hydrogen coupled to the reduction of nitrate or oxygen. Autotrophic Campylobacteria use the reverse Krebs cycle to fix carbon dioxide into biomass, a pathway originally thought to be of little environmental significance. The oxygen sensitivity of this pathway is consistent with their microaerophilic or anaerobic niche in these environments, and their likely evolution in the Mesoproterozoic oceans, which are thought to have been sulfidic with low levels of oxygen available from cyanobacterial photosynthesis.

== Phylogeny ==
The currently accepted taxonomy is based on the List of Prokaryotic names with Standing in Nomenclature (LPSN) and National Center for Biotechnology Information (NCBI).

16S rRNA based LTP_10_2024

- "Campylobacteria"
  - Nautiliales Miroshnichenko et al. 2004
  - Campylobacterales Garrity, Bell & Lilburn 2006

120 marker proteins based GTDB 09-RS220

- "Campylobacteria"
  - Nautiliales
  - Campylobacterales

== See also ==
- List of bacterial orders
- List of bacteria genera
