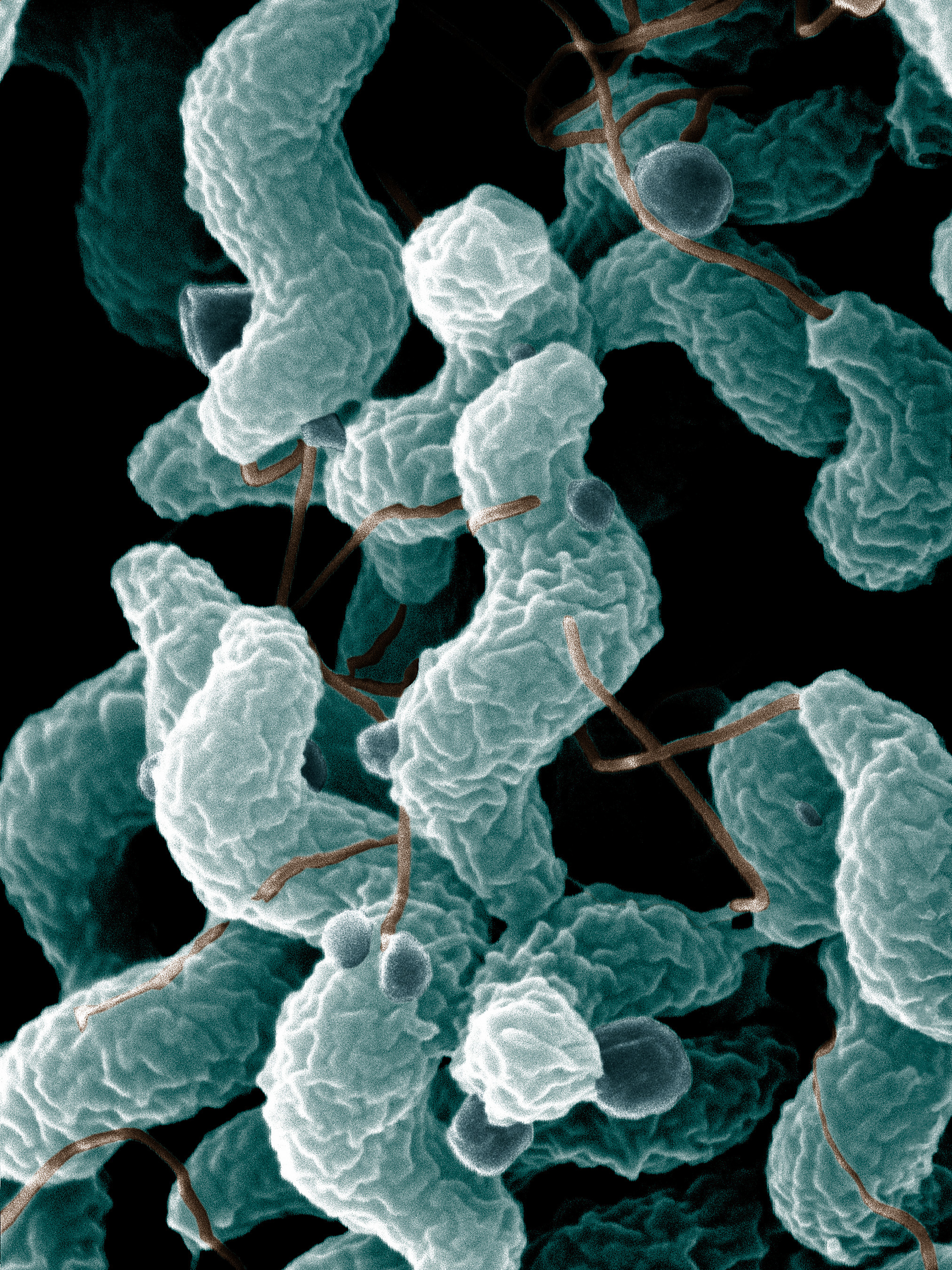
- Campylobacter

Scientific classification
- Domain: Bacteria
- Kingdom: Pseudomonadati
- Phylum: Campylobacterota; Waite et al. 2021

Classes
- "Campylobacteria"; Desulfurellia

Synonyms
- "Campylobacterota" Waite et al. 2018; Epsilobacteria Cavalier-Smith 2002; "Epsilonbacteraeota" (sic) Waite et al. 2017; "Epsilonbacterota"

= Campylobacterota =

Phylum of bacteria

Campylobacterota are a phylum of Gram-negative bacteria.

== Taxonomy ==
Until the 2021 revision of bacterial taxonomy by the ICSP, the entire phylum was classified within the Proteobacteria (synonym Pseudomonadota) as the Epsilonproteobacteria and the Desulfurellales. The separation of this phylum from "Proteobacteria" was originally proposed in 2017, using GTDB-based methods.

== Phylogeny ==
The currently accepted taxonomy is based on the List of Prokaryotic names with Standing in Nomenclature (LPSN) and National Center for Biotechnology Information (NCBI).

16S rRNA based LTP_10_2024

- - Desulfurellia
    - Desulfurellales
      - Desulfurellaceae
      - Hippeaceae
  - Campylobacteria
    - Nautiliales
      - Nautiliaceae
    - Campylobacterales
      - Nitratiruptoraceae
      - - Hydrogenimonadaceae
        - - Thioreductoraceae
          - - Helicobacteraceae
            - - - Sulfurovaceae
                - Sulfurimonadaceae
              - - Sulfurospirillaceae
                - - Arcobacteraceae
                  - Campylobacteraceae

120 marker proteins based GTDB 10-RS226

- Campylobacterota
  - Desulfurellia
    - Desulfurellales
      - Desulfurellaceae
      - Hippeaceae
  - Campylobacteria
    - Nautiliales
      Nautiliaceae
    - Campylobacterales
      - - - Thiovulaceae
          - Sulfurimonadaceae
        - - Nitratiruptoraceae
          - - Hydrogenimonadaceae
            - Sulfurovaceae
      - - Helicobacteraceae
        - - Arcobacteraceae
          - - Sulfurospirillaceae
            - - Sulfurospirillum_B {UBA1877}
              - Campylobacteraceae

== See also ==
- List of bacterial orders
- List of bacteria genera
