= Campylobacter showae =

Scientific classification
- Domain: Bacteria
- Kingdom: Pseudomonadati
- Phylum: Campylobacterota
- Class: "Campylobacteria"
- Order: Campylobacterales
- Family: Campylobacteraceae
- Genus: Campylobacter
- Species: C. showae

Binomial name
- Campylobacter showae Etoh et al. 1993

Species of bacterium

Campylobacter showae is a gram-negative, chemoheterotrophic, microaerophilic, motile bacteria belonging to the Campylobacter Genus. The type strain of this species, SU A4 (=ATCC 51146), was first isolated from plaque samples taken from the gingival crevices of the human oral cavity but has since also been found in colonic tissues and stool. Since its discovery, C. showae has been implicated in various medical conditions including Crohn's disease, periodontitis, inflammatory bowel disease, and ulcerative colitis due to its pathogenic nature.

== Taxonomy ==
A pan-genome analysis, looking at a set of single-copy conserved core genes between 39 Campylobacter species, found that C. showae was most closely related to Campylobacter rectus, with C. showae and C. rectus constituting more ancient lineages within the Campylobacter genus. A separate analysis of 16S rRNA sequences, comparing 1400 base positions in 21 Campylobacter, Wolinella, and Helicobacter bacterial strains, found that C. showae was most closely related to Campylobacter rectus, Campylobacter curvus, and Campylobacter concisus, with their sequences differing by 1.3%, 2.8%, and 4.9% respectively. These four Campylobacter species share many similarities including their known source, being dogs and humans, and in the diseases they cause in humans, with all four being implicated in gastrointestinal diseases such as gastroenteritis or ulcerative colitis and oral diseases like periodontitis.

== Discovery ==
Campylobacter showae was first discovered in October 1993 by researchers Yumiko Etoh, Floyd Dewhirst, Bruce Paster, Ayako Yamamoto, and Nobuichi Goto from the Showa University School of Dentistry and the Forsyth Dental Center. The bacteria was obtained via isolation from human gingival crevices and was subsequently differentiated fro based on its morphological differences such as their number of flagella. While the organism did show several biochemical similarities to Campylobacter curvus and Campylobacter rectus, these newly identified microbes had 2-5 flagella compared to the standard 1 in the 2 previously named organisms.

=== Isolation and Characterization ===
C. showae was first isolated from plaque within the gingival crevices of 9 healthy adults using plates containing CBRCA, a medium containing reinforced clostridial agar, 5% horse blood, 0.03% China Blue, 0.2% sodium formate, 0.3% sodium fumarate and menadione. Being selective for Campylobacter, Selenomonas, Fusobacterium, Veillonella, and Bacteroides strains, the resulting growth on the CBRCA plates allowed for the minimization of interference from other microorganisms and increased diagnostic sensitivity. The cultures were subsequently cultivated on brain heart infusion agar plates and incubated under anaerobic conditions in an 80% nitrogen, 10% carbon dioxide, 10% hydrogen atmosphere. Additionally, their ability to grow under microaerophilic conditions was tested via a Gas-Pak jar using blood agar plates with added sodium formate and fumarate at 0.2% and 0.3% concentrations respectively.

Characterization of the isolated strains was performed by electron microscopy, allowing for observation of cell structure and morphology. Additionally, several tests were performed to deduce the metabolic activities of the organisms including 1) testing for the presence of catalase enzyme, characteristic of facultative anaerobes and aerobes; 2) testing for oxidase activity to detect the presence of cytochrome c oxidase, an enzyme involved in aerobic respiration; 3) detection of enzymes that allow for Indoxyl acetate hydrolysis, allowing for the differentiation of Campylobacter subspecies; 4) detection of the alkaline phosphatase and gamma-glutamyl transpeptidase enzymes, providing metabolic information for species differentiation; 5) detection of the arylsulfatase to indicate the organism's ability to hydrolyze sulfate ester bonds; 6) detection of the urease enzyme which is involved in urea hydrolysis; 7) the ability for the organism to reduce nitrate and nitrite in order to reduce hydrogen sulfide; 8) detection of lysine and ornithine decarboxylase, an enzyme that allows for the decarboxylation of lysine and ornithine amino acids; 9) resistance to antibiotics such as nalidixic acid, to differentiate species based on antibiotic resistance, and more. To further differentiate species with similar phenotypes, SDS-page was used to compare the protein profiles of each bacteria, DNA-DNA homology was used to determine relatedness or genetic similarity between species, and 16S rRNA sequence comparisons were performed to deduce C. showae's phylogenetic relationships. As a result of these tests and experiments, C. showae was successfully isolated, characterized, and differentiated from its neighboring taxa.

=== Classification as a Novel Species ===
C. showae was given the distinction as a new species based on phylogenetic analysis performed by 16S rRNA sequence comparisons. Two previously described, but unnamed, C. showae strains were isolated and it was found that they displayed the closest relation to C. rectus, with their rRNA sequences differing at 1.35% of the positions – the same percent that Campylobacter coli and Campylobacter jejuni or Campylobacter lari and C. jejuni differed. As a result of this analysis, the researchers concluded that these species should be placed in the Campylobacter genus and exhibit adequate genetic distance to justify classification as a novel species.

== Morphology ==
C. showae exhibits a curved-rod or spiral shape with round ends, measuring 2-5μm long and 0.5-0.8μm wide. Although species of Campylobacter, such as C. curvus and C. rectus, primarily present only one polar flagellum, C. showae express 2-5 unipolar flagella, each with a diameter of 15-20 nm. Additionally, C. showae is Gram-negative and thus exhibits a cell wall composed of a cytoplasmic membrane and outer membrane in which a thin peptidoglycan layer resides in the periplasmic space. C. showae cells were not observed to have any surface layer, unlike C. rectus cells which assemble an S-layer or a crystalline layer of macromolecular subunits on their cell surface for protection.

== Metabolism ==
C. showae, along with other bacteria in the Campylobacter genus, are primarily chemoheterotrophic organisms, deriving energy mainly from citric acid cycle intermediates and amino acids via oxidation. Lacking the important glycolytic pathway enzyme, 6-phosphofructokinase, Campylobacter species are asaccharolytic, being unable to oxidize or ferment carbohydrates for use in its metabolism. These organisms can also perform respiration to conserve energy, coupling the oxidation of formate and hydrogen to the reduction of nitrate, sulfites, fumarates, oxygen and other electron acceptors to generate ATP via electron transport phosphorylation. Being a microaerophilic organism, C. showae can only tolerate an atmospheric oxygen concentration below normal atmospheric pressure, observed to grow best under atmospheric conditions of only 3%-6% Oxygen.

== Pathogenicity ==
The multiple flagella of C. showae are often found to be 2 to 3 times their attached cells in length and move in a corkscrew motion, allowing for the cell to be motile. This characteristic enables C. showae and other pathogenic species of the Campylobacter genus to perform chemotaxis in response to mediating chemoattractants. For instance, Campylobacter species can migrate towards metabolic substrates or electron donors and acceptors, allowing them to specifically locate and target sites for cellular invasion. After overcoming the host's protective mucus layer, Campylobacter species use a multitude of adhesion-mediating factors such as CadF, an outer-membrane adhesin protein that binds to fibronectin, to facilitate adherence to host cells and induce internalization. By residing within a vacuole or other membrane-bound compartment of the host cell, Campylobacter can thus avoid the defense mechanisms of the host cell and survive by utilizing its nutrients until conditions permit a cytotoxic response to be induced.

== Genomics ==
A 2019 study conducted by Tiffany Hsu et al. analyzed the genome biology and performed comparative genomics of various C. showae strains. Short read Illumina sequencing was conducted for 8 strains of this bacteria with 4 being subject to PacBio RSII long read sequencing. The sizes of each genome ranged from 2.1Mb-2.6Mb with an estimated >98% completeness by BUSCO with the exception of 2 strains at 92.9% and 97.6%. As a result of this sequencing and subsequent functional and genomic assessments, it was found that strains of C. showae exhibit significant diversity, both genetically and phenotypically. For example, the T4SS gene, which allows for the transfer of protein substrates and DNA to host cells, along with genes enabling the formation of an S-layer on the bacteria's surface, were found only in the invasive or adherent strains of C. showae. On the other hand, proteins associated with CRISPR and RTX toxins (leukotoxins and hemolysins) were only found in non-invasive or non-adherent strains of C. showae. Additionally, genes for methyl-accepting chemotaxis proteins were only found in C. showae strains that reside in the subgingival plaque of the oral cavity, further demonstrating the heterogeneity of C. showae strains. C. showae's core genome is estimated to consist of around 1,284 genes, with each additional genome adding around 200 genes. Within C. showae's genome, the core proteins found were DNA pol I and III, with various flagellar genes such as flhA, fliP, and fliS, also being found to be shared between strains. C. showae was also found to have genes coding for the 3-subunit fumarate reductase enzyme, allowing for C. showae's fumarate metabolism, and genes coding for formate hydrogenlyase, formate tetrahydrofolate ligase, and formate dehydrogenase, allowing for C. showae's formate metabolism.

== Ecology ==
C. showae was initially isolated from human gingival crevices, residing in the human oral mucosa and within dental plaque biofilms, and has also been observed in human colonic tissues and stool. Exhibiting a respiratory-type metabolism, Campylobacter species require oxygen for energy production and growth. However, they are microaerophilic, meaning they can only tolerate an atmospheric oxygen concentration below normal atmospheric pressure and have been observed to grow best under atmospheric conditions of only 3%-6% Oxygen. C. showae, along with other human and animal pathogenic species in this genus, are mesophilic and grow best in conditions ranging from 25 to 45.4 °C (77.0 to 113.7 °F) Organisms of this genus display neutrophilic characteristics, growing best in a pH range of 6.5-7.5 and are unable to survive below a pH 4.9 or above a pH of 9.0. Unlike other food-borne pathogens, members of the Campylobacter genus do not display the same extent of adaptive stress responses, being vulnerable to aeration, desiccation, osmotic stress, low water activity, and high salt concentrations. These characteristics are indicative of the species' adaptations to live in a host environment such as within the human oral cavity or gastrointestinal tract, in which temperature and nutrient availability remain constant.

== Importance ==
C. showae has been implicated in numerous human health conditions. For example, C. showae has historically been linked to gum disease, also known as periodontal disease. Periodontal disease can be characterized by the infection of the gingiva, or gum tissue, resulting in symptoms like inflammation, bleeding on probing, and periodontal attachment loss. C. showae can contribute to the development of gum disease by adhering to oral epithelial cells and releasing pro-inflammatory cytokines like IL-1β and IL-8, resulting in tissue damage. C. showae has also been linked to several diseases marked by persistent inflammation of an individual's digestive tract, including Crohn's disease and ulcerative colitis. Having the ability to invade and colonize the intestinal mucosa, C. showae can adhere and penetrate the epithelial cells lining intestinal tract once in the gut, resulting in an immune response triggering inflammation. As a result of contributing and exacerbating gut inflammation, C. showae can also potentially increase the risk of developing colorectal cancer, which has been linked to chronic gut inflammation. However, research must be conducted to fully understand C. showae's role in these health conditions and if a true causal relationship exists. Further research into C. showae's biology and pathogenicity can also provide valuable insights into disease prevention strategies, bacterial pathogenesis, and the consequences of bacterial dysbiosis in the human body.
