= Bovine campylobacteriosis =

Bacterial disease

Bovine campylobacteriosis is caused by Campylobacter jejuni or Campylobacter coli. Although it is a commensal in the gastrointestinal tract of many species, it can cause diarrhea - mainly in young animals. It is most commonly seen in cattle, but may also infect many other species, including humans. Campylobacter is spread horizontally via the fecal-oral route.

Campylobacter fetus can also cause venereal disease and abortion in cattle.
