= Campylobacter mucosalis =

Scientific classification
- Domain: Bacteria
- Kingdom: Pseudomonadati
- Phylum: Campylobacterota
- Class: "Campylobacteria"
- Order: Campylobacterales
- Family: Campylobacteraceae
- Genus: Campylobacter
- Species: C. mucosalis

Binomial name
- Campylobacter mucosalis (Lawson, Leaver, Pettigrew & Rowland 1981) Roop, Smibert, Johnson & Krieg 1985

Species of bacterium

Campylobacter mucosalis is a species of gram-negative bacteria initially isolated in 1974 by Lawson and Rowland from the lesions of porcine intestinal adenomatosis. Isolated species were gram-negative, microaerophilic and curve shaped. These organisms resembled Campylobacter sputorum in their morphological and phenotypic characteristics and were given the name Campylobacter sputorum subsp. mucosalis. A study, using DNA homology experiments, found that Campylobacter sputorum subsp. mucosalis is a distinct species and is not a subspecies of C. sputorum. Thus, its name was changed to Campylobacter mucosalis.

== Description ==
The cells are short, irregularly curved, and gram-negative and may appear as spiral forms 0.25 to 0.3 μm in diameter and 1 to 3 μm long. They move using a single polar flagellum. Coccoid bodies and filaments may be seen in older cultures. Colonies are 1.5 mm in diameter, circular, and raised with surfaces. The colonies have a dirty yellow color that is best seen by smearing a colony on a piece of white paper. Requires either hydrogen or formate as an electron donor for growth. Grows under microaerophilic conditions (6% O_{2}, 5% CO_{2}, 15% H_{2}, 74% N_{2}) where O_{2} serves as the electron acceptor or anaerobic with fumarate as the terminal electron acceptor.

== Procurement ==
Isolated from the intestinal mucosa of pigs with porcine intestinal adenomatosis, necrotic enteritis, regional ileitis and proliferative hemorrhagic enteropathy, also isolated from the oral cavities of pigs.

== Distinguishing characteristics ==
Campylobacter mucosalis strains can be distinguished from all other catalase-negative Campylobacter strains except C. concisus by their requirement for H_{2} or formate for microaerophilic growth and H_{2} fumarate or formate and fumarate for anaerobic growth. Although C. concisus strains are similar to C. mucosalis in phenotypic characteristics, they have only a very low level of DNA homology with C. mucosalis. Campylobacter mucosalis strains can be distinguished from Campylobacter concisus strains by their susceptibility to cephalothin, by their ability to grow at 25 °C (77 °F), and by the dirty yellow color of their colonies.

== Cases of human infection ==
Two cases of infection in children were reported in 1993. They recovered without the use of antimicrobial therapy.
