= CMP-N,N'-diacetyllegionaminic acid synthase =

Enzyme

Identifiers
- EC no.: 2.7.7.82

Databases
- IntEnz: IntEnz view
- BRENDA: BRENDA entry
- ExPASy: NiceZyme view
- KEGG: KEGG entry
- MetaCyc: metabolic pathway
- PRIAM: profile
- PDB structures: RCSB PDB PDBe PDBsum
Search
- PMC: articles
- PubMed: articles
- NCBI: proteins

CMP-N,N'-diacetyllegionaminic acid synthase (EC 2.7.7.82, CMP-N,N'-diacetyllegionaminic acid synthetase, neuA (gene), legF (gene)) is an enzyme with systematic name CTP:N,N'-diacetyllegionaminate cytidylyltransferase. This enzyme catalyses the following chemical reaction

CTP + N,N'-diacetyllegionaminate $\rightleftharpoons$ CMP-N,N'-diacetyllegionaminate + diphosphate

This enzyme is isolated from the bacteria Legionella pneumophila and Campylobacter jejuni.
