= GalNAc-alpha-(1-4)-GalNAc-alpha-(1-3)-diNAcBac-PP-undecaprenol alpha-1,4-N-acetyl-D-galactosaminyltransferase =

Class of enzymes

GalNAc-alpha-(1->4)-GalNAc-alpha-(1->3)-diNAcBac-PP-undecaprenol alpha-1,4-N-acetyl-D-galactosaminyltransferase

Identifiers
- EC no.: 2.4.1.292

Databases
- IntEnz: IntEnz view
- BRENDA: BRENDA entry
- ExPASy: NiceZyme view
- KEGG: KEGG entry
- MetaCyc: metabolic pathway
- PRIAM: profile
- PDB structures: RCSB PDB PDBe PDBsum
Search
- PMC: articles
- PubMed: articles
- NCBI: proteins

GalNAc-alpha-(1->4)-GalNAc-alpha-(1->3)-diNAcBac-PP-undecaprenol alpha-1,4-N-acetyl-D-galactosaminyltransferase (EC 2.4.1.292, PglH) is an enzyme with systematic name UDP-N-acetyl-alpha-D-galactosamine:GalNAc-alpha-(1->4)-GalNAc-alpha-(1->3)-diNAcBac-PP-tritrans,heptacis-undecaprenol 4-alpha-N-acetyl-D-galactosaminyltransferase. This enzyme catalyses the following chemical reaction

3 UDP-N-acetyl-alpha-D-galactosamine + GalNAc-alpha-(1->4)-GalNAc-alpha-(1->3)-diNAcBac-PP-tritrans,heptacis-undecaprenol $\rightleftharpoons$ 3 UDP + [GalNAc-alpha-(1->4)]4-GalNAc-alpha-(1->3)-diNAcBac-PP-tritrans,heptacis-undecaprenol

This enzyme is solated from Campylobacter jejuni.
