= GalNAc5-diNAcBac-PP-undecaprenol beta-1,3-glucosyltransferase =

Class of enzymes

Identifiers
- EC no.: 2.4.1.293

Databases
- IntEnz: IntEnz view
- BRENDA: BRENDA entry
- ExPASy: NiceZyme view
- KEGG: KEGG entry
- MetaCyc: metabolic pathway
- PRIAM: profile
- PDB structures: RCSB PDB PDBe PDBsum
Search
- PMC: articles
- PubMed: articles
- NCBI: proteins

GalNAc5-diNAcBac-PP-undecaprenol beta-1,3-glucosyltransferase (EC 2.4.1.293, PglI) is an enzyme with systematic name UDP-alpha-D-glucose:(GalNAc-alpha-(1->4))4-GalNAc-alpha-(1->3)-diNAcBac-diphospho-tritrans,heptacis-undecaprenol 3-beta-D-glucosyltransferase. This enzyme catalyses the following chemical reaction

UDP-alpha-D-glucose + [GalNAc-alpha-(1->4)]4-GalNAc-alpha-(1->3)-diNAcBac-diphospho-tritrans,heptacis-undecaprenol $\rightleftharpoons$ UDP + [GalNAc-alpha-(1->4)]2-[Glc-beta-(1->3)]-[GalNAc-alpha-(1->4)]2-GalNAc-alpha-(1->3)-diNAcBac-diphospho-tritrans,heptacis-undecaprenol

This enzyme is isolated from the bacterium Campylobacter jejuni.
