= N-acetylgalactosamine-N,N'-diacetylbacillosaminyl-diphospho-undecaprenol 4-alpha-N-acetylgalactosaminyltransferase =

Class of enzymes

Identifiers
- EC no.: 2.4.1.291

Databases
- IntEnz: IntEnz view
- BRENDA: BRENDA entry
- ExPASy: NiceZyme view
- KEGG: KEGG entry
- MetaCyc: metabolic pathway
- PRIAM: profile
- PDB structures: RCSB PDB PDBe PDBsum
Search
- PMC: articles
- PubMed: articles
- NCBI: proteins

N-acetylgalactosamine-N, N'-diacetylbacillosaminyl-diphospho-undecaprenol 4-alpha-N-acetylgalactosaminyltransferase (EC 2.4.1.291, PglJ) is an enzyme with systematic name UDP-N-acetyl-alpha-D-galactosamine:N-acetylgalactosaminyl-alpha-(1->3)-N,N'-diacetyl-alpha-D-bacillosaminyl-diphospho-tritrans,heptacis-undecaprenol 3-alpha-N-acetyl-D-galactosaminyltransferase. This enzyme catalyses the following chemical reaction

UDP-N-acetyl-alpha-D-galactosamine + N-acetyl-D-galactosaminyl-alpha-(1->3)-N,N'-diacetyl-alpha-D-bacillosaminyl-diphospho-tritrans,heptacis-undecaprenol $\rightleftharpoons$ UDP + N-acetyl-D-galactosaminyl-alpha-(1->4)-N-acetyl-D-galactosaminyl-alpha-(1->3)-N,N'-diacetyl-alpha-D-bacillosaminyl-diphospho-tritrans,heptacis-undecaprenol

This enzyme is isolated from Campylobacter jejuni.
