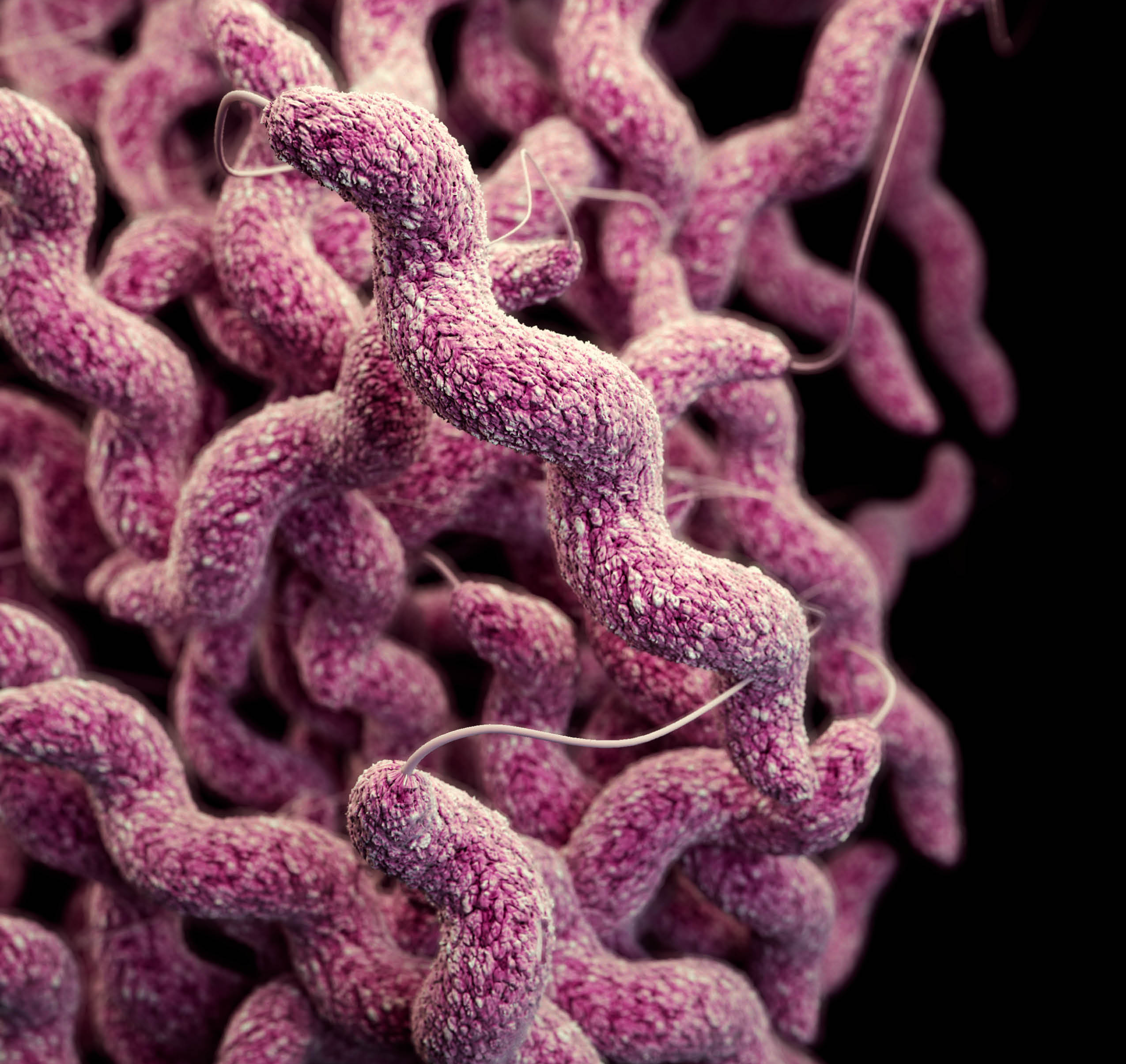
- Computer-generated illustration of C. fetus showing the characteristic "S-shaped" morphology.

Scientific classification
- Domain: Bacteria
- Kingdom: Pseudomonadati
- Phylum: Campylobacterota
- Class: "Campylobacteria"
- Order: Campylobacterales
- Family: Campylobacteraceae
- Genus: Campylobacter
- Species: C. fetus

Binomial name
- Campylobacter fetus (Smith & Taylor 1919) Sebald & Véron 1963

= Campylobacter fetus =

Species of bacterium

Campylobacter fetus is a rod-shaped, gram-negative species of bacteria within the genus Campylobacter of phylum Pseudomonadota. Identification of C. fetus species in infected animals or people is routinely performed by culture on blood or cefoperazone deoxycholate agar. Subspecies of C. fetus commonly causes reproductive disease in ruminants and gastrointestinal disease in humans. Transmission of C. fetus subspecies venerealis occurs mainly through venereal contact while transmission of C. fetus subspecies fetus occurs mainly through ingestion of bacteria in a contaminated environment. Infertility in cattle and abortion in sheep are common outcomes of infection associated with C. fetus subspecies venerealis and C. fetus subspecies fetus, respectively. Disease in humans occurs through zoonotic transmission of C. fetus mainly via ingestion of contaminated food or water sources. C. fetus can be diagnosed with polymerase chain reaction assays, enzyme linked immunosorbent assays and vaginal mucus agglutination testing. As vaccines are typically not efficient in preventing future spread, infected bulls are often culled. Human infections may be treated with erythromycin as antimicrobial resistance has been emerging for the fluoroquinolones.

== Morphology and identification ==
On cytology, C. fetus is a gram-negative rod, though may present coccoid under suboptimal conditions. A distinguishing feature of C. fetus is the "S-shape" of the rod, resembling thin, helical spirochaetes. C. fetus can be a highly motile organism by means of a single, unsheathed flagellum. Genus identification based on motility may be possible due to their characteristic corkscrew-like movement. C. fetus are non-spore forming and microaerophilic organisms that are both catalase and oxidase-positive, but non-fermentative.

Identification of C. fetus requires aseptic sample collection, followed by culture and potentially further biochemical and molecular methods. To increase the likelihood of successful growth, cultures on blood agar should be performed as soon as possible following collection. If samples are likely to be contaminated or faster growth is required, selective media or the use of antibiotics can be employed to inhibit growth of contaminants. Modified charcoal cefoperazone deoxycholate (CCD) agar is a growth medium designed to isolate Campylobacters from feces. On CCD agar, C. fetus will grow as grey colonies that may appear moist. Growth of C. fetus can be seen within 40–48 hours of incubation between 25–37 °C under microaerophilic conditions. Some, but not all species of C. fetus will grow at 42 °C. Because C. fetus is a fastidious organism to grow, positive cultures can be considered diagnostic, however negative cultures cannot rule out the possibility of infection.

Additional methods of identification may be used to diagnosis C. fetus to the subspecies level. Biochemical methods can identify subspecies of C. fetus, though may be considered unreliable. Campylobacter fetus subspecies fetus (Cff) can grow in 1% glycine and produce H_{2}S, while C. fetus subspecies venerealis (Cfv) cannot. Growth of Cff will not occur in 3.5% NaCl. To increase reliability of identification, molecular methods such as polymerase chain reaction or DNA sequencing may be utilized. Other methods of identification include histology, immunohistochemistry, direct immunofluorescence, agglutination and enzyme-linked immunosorbent assay.

== Virulence factors ==
Campylobacter spp. in general possess membrane lipopolysaccharide (LPS) with low biological activity compared to other bacteria (i.e. Enterobacteriaceae), subsequently avoiding detection by the host immune system and which may explain why persistent infections can occur. In terms of subspecies, C. fetus subspecies venerealis and C. fetus subspecies fetus have a unique structural component that prevents host-mediated phagocytosis; this "S-layer" is a microcapsule of high molecular weight proteins arranged in a lattice formation. The S-layer prevents complement-mediated bacterial killing by impairing the binding of C3b to the surface of the bacteria. The S-layer is critical in the pathogenicity of C. fetus, as it allows for a significant bacteremic phase for hematogenous dissemination. Additionally, Cfv has long LPS side chains (O-antigens) that may resist complement-mediated bacterial killing. Aside from complement-mediated mechanisms, C. fetus has also evolved variation in its S-layer proteins (SLPs) of the S-layer to subvert the host antibody response. Campylobacter fetus exhibits chemotaxis for bovine cervical mucus and its components (amino acids, organic acids, fucose and iron) and bovine placenta which may explain its tropism for the cow's genital tract.

Pathogenesis There are two subspecies of C. fetus that cause reproductive disease in ruminants; C. fetus subspecies fetus and C. fetus subspecies venerealis. These subspecies are associated with abortion in sheep and cattle and infertility in cattle, respectively. C. fetus subspecies fetus is a zoonotic pathogen that has been reported to cause disease in immunocompromised humans. Similar to C. fetus subspecies jejuni, C. fetus subspecies fetus can be acquired via fecal-oral route and resides mostly in the gastrointestinal tract. Other means of transmission include the ingestion of infected fluid or placentas. Infections with Cff appear to be more detrimental in ewes than in cows, spreading readily through a flock resulting in abortion storms.

=== Bovine ===
==== Campylobacter fetus subspecies venerealis ====
Bovine infectious infertility is a reproductive disease caused by infection of Cfv that leads to early embryonic mortality in cattle. Other names for this disease in cattle include campylobacteriosis, bovine venereal campylobacteriosis (BVC), bovine genital campylobacteriosis. The disease is also referred to more colloquially as "vibriosis", based on the former classification of the bacteria under the Vibrio genus. Bovine venereal campylobacteriosis is primarily a problem in beef cattle breeding stock. C. fetus subspecies venerealis is an obligate colonizer of the bull penile and preputial mucosa. Infection of bulls with Cfv is a chronic, asymptomatic infection that leads to the development carrier bulls in the breeding herd. Infection of the prepuce can persist for years in bulls and is often undetected due to the lack of any visible lesions on the penis or prepuce. Younger bulls are more likely to clear the Cfv infection than older bulls, therefore transmission risk increases with bull age. Transmission of Cfv to cows occurs through mating with an infected bull. Alongside Tritrichomonas foetus, bovine venereal campylobacteriosis considered an important sexually transmitted disease (STD) of cattle. However, transmission can occur by artificial insemination with semen from an infected bull. Transmissibility from carriers to naïve cows is high, such that outbreaks of Cfv in the herd can often be traced to the introduction of a new bull. Infection sites in the cow include the vagina, cervix, endometrium, and oviducts. If the cow becomes pregnant, the placenta can also be a site of infection. Rather than the bacterial colonization itself, the ensuing inflammatory response in the uterus and oviducts is often the cause of early embryonic mortality. Loss of embryos is generally within the first 15 to 21 days of conception, indicating infection occurred near mating. Late term abortions have been reported for Cfv infections in cows, but are much less likely than early embryonic loss. Cows with BVC display irregular estrus cycles, signs of heat when presumed to be pregnant, and increased returns to service, but often lack any outward signs of infection. On a herd level, Cfv leads to widespread infertility, wide variability in calf age, longer calving seasons, and decreased calf crops. Infected cows may return to estrus up to five times before pregnancy can be maintained. Infections and pregnancy loss in subsequent calving seasons is substantially less severe than the first season of infection, as cows can mount a sufficient immune response. However, the bacteria can persist in the vaginal mucosa for years in some cows, leading to infection of bulls upon mating. It is also reported that Cfv can become endemic in cow herds, leading to a low incidence of embryonic loss every 4 to 5 years; in these cases, heifers appear to be most vulnerable to Cfv infection as they lack sufficient immunity. Cow- to-cow transmission of Cfv has not been reported. A major risk factor for introduction of Cfv-infection in a breeding herd is the introduction of new animals with unknown Cfv-status, whether these be cows or bulls. Economic losses from Cfv infections can be substantial – such losses include culling non-pregnant cows, culling infected bulls, decreased calves born, decreased weaning weights, and prolonged calving seasons.

==== Campylobacter fetus subspecies fetus ====
Campylobacter fetus subspecies fetus is a commensal organism of the bovine gastrointestinal tract. Campylobacter fetus subspecies fetus is a cause of sporadic abortions in cattle and sheep, but is more of a serious problem in sheep production. Ingestion of fecal-contaminated food or water, rather than venereal transmission as with Cfv, is the route of exposure for cattle. Infection arises from hematogenous spread of the bacteria from the gastrointestinal tract through the uterus to infect the placenta of pregnant cows. Often, this will lead to failure of pregnancy and, more commonly, late-term abortions (i.e., between months 4 to 7 of gestation). Infection of the fetus leads to death, however the fetus is retained for a period of time prior to expulsion. Retention of the deceased fetus causes necrosis of the placenta and placental lesions are not easily distinguished from Brucella abortus, characterized by cotyledon colour change from pink/red to yellow/brown. Other pathologic characteristics of placental necrosis include placental edema and leathery texture.

=== Ovine ===
Campylobacter fetus subspecies fetus

Campylobacter fetus subspecies fetus is a normal member of the sheep gastrointestinal microbiome. Transmission occurs through the fecal-oral route or by hematogenous spread from the intestine to the reproductive tract and placenta. Infection from ingestion of Cff-contaminated placenta is also a possible route of infection. Ewes that appear to be particularly sensitive to Cff infection are those with underlying immunosuppression or are naïve to the flock. Campylobacter fetus subspecies fetus localizes in the placenta of the pregnant ewe and may lead to fetal hepatitis. Specifically, in sheep and goats, fetuses aborted due to campylobacteriosis, are often accompanied with an edematous placenta, friable cotyledons and upon necropsy exhibit necrotic foci on their livers. Late-term abortion is the main outcome of a Cff infection. Abortion outbreaks can be seen with Cff in a susceptible ewe herd, where few sporadic abortions are followed by large numbers of abortions in the herd. In naïve herds, the incidence of abortions can reach 70%. Abortions occur within 3 to 4 weeks of infection. Infected ewes rarely show systemic disease, but may include diarrhea, fever, and vaginal discharge. If infection occurs near-term, weak lambs are born and often die within several days. In rare cases, a fetus may die in utero and cause an ascending infection from the placenta, septicemia and possibly death in the ewe. Ewes can often mount sufficient immune responses following infection, therefore subsequent lambing seasons are not as severely affected. Campylobacter jejuni, another gastrointestinal tract commensal of ruminants, is another important cause of abortion in ewes.

=== Zoonosis/interspecies transmission ===
Campylobacter fetus subspecies fetus infections are associated with gastroenteritis and, rarely, sepsis in people. Although most infections are self-resolving of particular concern are those individuals with underlying conditions (e.g., HIV), seniors, as well as pregnant women. Clinically relevant transmission between humans generally involve neonates. Zoonotic transmission of Cff occurs mainly by ingestion of food and water contaminated by feces from infected ruminants, or ingestion of unpasteurized dairy products from infected cows. Ingestion of raw ovine or bovine liver has also been linked to sources of infection. Likewise, cross-contamination due to improper food safety has resulted in similar infections. Symptoms of acute gastroenteritis associated with Cff infections include abdominal cramping, nausea, diarrhea and fever. When sepsis does occur, Cff can cause a myriad of infections in accidental hosts such as perinatal, neurological and endocardial infections. Occasionally, abortion in humans can occur, similar to that in sheep, as a result of placental infection through septic spread of Cff from the gastrointestinal tract. The fetus can either undergo spontaneous abortion or be born with an ongoing infection which can eventuate in the infiltration of nervous tissues. Campylobacter fetus subspecies venerealis rarely causes sepsis in immunocompromised individuals.

== Diagnosis ==
Epidemiological clues in the breeding herd or flock can indicate Campylobacter fetus infections. Often, C. fetus may not be suspected until herd level changes are noticed, generally at the end of the breeding season (Cfv) or end of herd gestation (Cff) (e.g., high incidence of open cows, multiple returns to service, high incidence of abortions in ewes). If suspected, C. fetus can be diagnosed through basic culturing and laboratory tests such as polymerase chain reaction (PCR) assays, enzyme linked immune sorbent assays (ELISA), and vaginal mucus agglutination test (VMAT). Diagnosis depends on isolation of the causative agent under microaerophilic conditions. C. fetus is extremely delicate to environmental conditions including sunlight, dehydration, increased temperature, and high O_{2}. In adverse conditions, the spiral rods degenerate to a coccoid morphology, making diagnosis based on morphology difficult. In addition, C. fetus can be quickly outgrown by competing microbes, indicating that timely culture and sample submission are important.

For reproductive diseases, samples may include vaginal mucus swabs, preputial washes or scrapings with buffered sterile saline, stomach contents or tissue of abortuses. Samples should be immediately transported to the lab and enrichment needs to be provided to allow accurate diagnosis. Samples should be kept at 25–37 °C and supplied on mediums such as Clarks Transport Medium (contains gas and fresh bovine serum) or Amies Medium (contains charcoal). Antibiotics can be used to inhibit competing microbes for faster growth of C. fetus.

Prior to diagnosis, labs will culture the organism from samples. Diagnosis is most commonly done using blood agar, where growth is presented after incubation over 4–5 days at 25–37 °C. Colonies will appear as gamma-hemolytic, round, and light pink. A microaerophilic environment with reduced oxygen (5-10%) and carbon dioxide (3-5%) is needed through the use of specialized gas packs. Once cultured, molecular tests can be performed to obtain a more accurate diagnosis.

=== ELISA ===
Measuring IgA antibodies in vaginal mucus is used as a diagnostic test. Specificity of ELISA may reach 98.5%, however antibody fluctuations in cattle can result in false positives. In an ELISA test using murine monoclonal antibodies, 66 preputial samples were collected. 49 of these were positive for ELISA and culture and 16 were positive by ELISA only making it useful as a diagnostic test for C. fetus.

=== Vaginal Mucus Agglutination Test ===
Agglutination can detect the binding of antibodies and antigens, resulting in clumped bacterial cells. Since antibodies to the target organism may cross-react with other organisms, autoagglutination may occur. Agglutination is primarily used when the sample is obtained from a vaginal mucous wash, and the test may reach a sensitivity of 50%.

=== PCR ===
Real time PCR techniques using ISCfe1 insertion site is the most sensitive technique for diagnosis of Cfv-associated abortion. ISCfe1 is a newly discovered insertion site used in PCR to differentiate between Cfv and Cff. It only occurs in Cfv strains, so it is essential for the implementation of efficient Cfv control and eradication. Samples from stomach contents and vaginal discharges allow accurate diagnosis of C. fetus and its subspecies for epidemiological and pathogenic purposes.

ELISA and VMAT are good diagnostic tests, although they are usually used for screening purposes and a proper diagnosis requires further tests via PCR. The PCR assay differentiates between subspecies of C. fetus, which important to determine pathogenesis and develop an effective treatment plan. However, diagnosis of C. fetus may be problematic due to poor growth in atmospheric conditions and the ability to be outcompeted by contaminating microbes. To overcome this, multiple samples are to be collected from each animal and multiple tests may be used simultaneously to increase sensitivity and the probability of a correct diagnosis.

== Treatment ==
Venereal campylobacteriosis is more commonly found in herds where natural mating is allowed. Infected bulls are typically removed from the herd or culled as treatment can be difficult and may result in persistent carriers. Antibiotic treatment of infected bulls and cows with Cfv is considered impractical. Artificial insemination may reduce the prevalence of infection if a Cfv-free source bull is used. As cows can recover from these infections, they are not culled but kept from mating naturally for at least two calving seasons. Vaccines can be used to reduce the occurrence of campylobacteriosis but will not eradicate infections. For example, vaccination of bulls, cows, and heifers against Cfv has some efficacy but does not consistently prevent transmission. C. fetus may evade complete detection and eradication by the immune system as chronic and relapse cases have been noted. The majority of C. fetus infections have been specifically linked to Cff. The ovine Cff vaccine has likewise been found ineffective in preventing future infections in ewes given that it does not provide protection against all strains of Cff.

In zoonotic cases of Campylobacter, infections will often resolve without treatment. Should there be underlying conditions or risk factors, patients may be treated with erythromycin. Fluoroquinolones are often avoided as antimicrobial resistance has been emerging. Often in these cases of interspecies infections, proper hygienic protocols of food safety and hand hygiene can prevent infection.

== See also ==
- Campylobacteriosis
