= Campylobacter hyointestinalis =

Scientific classification
- Domain: Bacteria
- Kingdom: Pseudomonadati
- Phylum: Campylobacterota
- Class: "Campylobacteria"
- Order: Campylobacterales
- Family: Campylobacteraceae
- Genus: Campylobacter
- Species: C. hyointestinalis

Binomial name
- Campylobacter hyointestinalis Gebhart et al. 1983

Species of bacterium

Campylobacter hyointestinalis is a species of Campylobacter implicated as a pathogen in gastroenteritis and diarrhoea in humans. It has been known to be transmitted from its usual host, the pig, to humans. In pigs, it is usually associated with proliferative ileitis, and found in conjunction with other species of that genus; however, it has also been isolated from hamster and cattle feces. It is catalase-positive, hydrogen sulfide-positive in the TSI slant, glycine-tolerant, and intolerant to 3.0% sodium chloride. It is able to grow at 25 °C, is sensitive to cephalothin, and resistant to nalidixic acid.
