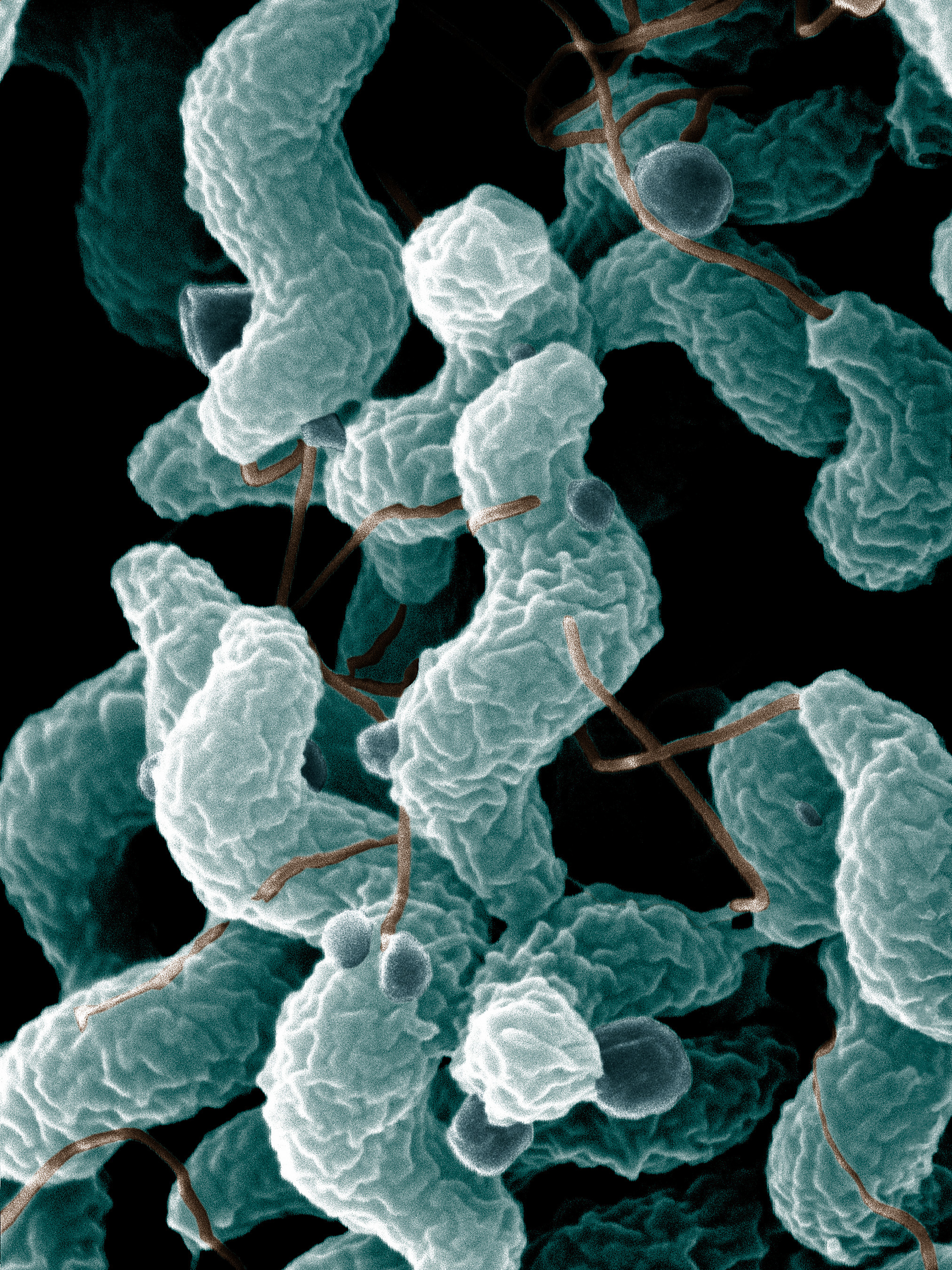
- Campylobacter jejuni

Scientific classification
- Domain: Bacteria
- Kingdom: Pseudomonadati
- Phylum: Campylobacterota
- Class: "Campylobacteria"
- Order: Campylobacterales
- Family: Campylobacteraceae
- Genus: Campylobacter; Sebald & Véron 1963

Type species
- Campylobacter fetus (Smith & Taylor 1919) Sebald & Veron 1963

Species
- See text

= Campylobacter =

Genus of gram-negative bacteria

Campylobacter is a type of bacteria that can cause a diarrheal disease in people. Its name means 'curved bacterium' because the germ typically appears in a comma or s shape. According to its scientific classification, it is a genus of gram-negative bacteria that is motile. (Note: Motile means that it can move of its own.)

The germ is common in nature and in domestic animals. It is frequently found in raw food of vegetable and animal origin. Its numbers can be very high in some foods, such as raw poultry. Due to their diverse natural reservoir, some Campylobacter can also be detected in the air, although not at an epidemiologically significant level. The disease that some of the species of the bacteria can cause is called campylobacteriosis. (Note: It is usually self-limiting and antimicrobial treatment is often not required, except in severe cases or immunocompromised patients.)

At least a dozen species of Campylobacter have been implicated in human disease, with C. jejuni (80–90%) and C. coli (5–10%) being the most common. C. jejuni is recognized as one of the main causes of bacterial foodborne disease in many developed countries. It is the number one cause of bacterial gastroenteritis in Europe, with over 246,000 cases confirmed annually. C. jejuni infection can also cause bacteremia in immunocompromised people, while C. lari is a known cause of recurrent diarrhea in children. C. fetus can cause spontaneous abortions in cattle and sheep, and it is an opportunistic pathogen in humans. Commensal relatives of Campylobacter are also abundant in the rumen epithelial microbiome and are implicated in short-chain fatty acid metabolism.

== Morphology and phenotype ==
Campylobacter spp. generally appear as curved or comma-shaped rods, and they are able to move via unipolar or bipolar flagella. They grow best between 37 and 42 °C in a microaerophilic environment. When exposed to atmospheric oxygen, C. jejuni is able to change into a coccus form. Most species of Campylobacter are positive by the oxidase test and catalase test and are able to reduce nitrate. The number of known quinolone-resistant Campylobacter strains is growing. It is suggested that this is caused by the overuse of quinolone antibiotics in animal agriculture.

== History ==
Theodor Escherich was the first to describe in 1886 what are known today as Campylobacters in the stool samples of infants, who perished from a disease he named "cholera infantum". In the following years until the end of the century, a number of publications appeared, describing the occurrence of such "spirilla" in cases of "cholera-like" and "dysenteric" disease. These organisms were mainly found in the colon or associated with mucus in diarrhoeal stool specimens. Vibrio-like bacteria were also described by Sir John McFadyean and Stockman in 1913 in fetal tissues of aborted sheep. For several years Campylobacters were continuously referred to as Vibrio-like organisms, until 1963 when Sebald and Veron gave the name "Campylobacter" to the genus based on their shape and microaerophilic growth requirement and after showing significant biological differences with Vibrio species.

== Genomics ==
The genomes of several Campylobacter species have been sequenced, beginning with C. jejuni in 2000. These genome studies have identified molecular markers specific to members of Campylobacter. Campylobacter spp. genomes are rather small compared to those of other gastrointestinal pathogens, with sizes ranging between 1.60 and 1.90 Mbp. A characteristic of most Campylobacter genomes is the presence of hypervariable regions, which can differ greatly between different strains.

Studies have investigated the genes responsible for motility in Campylobacter species. Some Campylobacter species contain two flagellin genes in tandem for motility, flaA and flaB. These genes undergo intergenic recombination, further contributing to their virulence. A single Type VI secretion system (T6SS) cluster was also predicted in approximately one-third of Campylobacter species, grouping into three distinct organisations and harbouring up to five vgrG genes.

== Phylogeny ==
The currently accepted taxonomy is based on the List of Prokaryotic names with Standing in Nomenclature (LPSN) and National Center for Biotechnology Information (NCBI).

16S rRNA based LTP_10_2024

- Campylobacter
  - C. canadensis
  - - - - - C. lari
          - C. volucris
        - - - C. armoricus
            - C. peloridis
          - - C. novaezeelandiae
            - - C. cuniculorum
              - - - C. avium
                  - C. troglodytis
                - - C. helveticus
                  - - C. upsaliensis
                    - C. vulpis
      - - - C. insulaenigrae
          - - C. bilis
            - C. hepaticus
        - - - Campylobacter lari concheus
            - - C. ornithocola
              - C. subantarcticus
          - - C. jejuni
            - - C. estrildidarum
              - - C. aviculae
                - C. taeniopygiae
    - - C. coli
      - - - Campylobacter hyointestinalis lawsonii
          - - - C. lanienae
              - C. magnus
            - - C. iguaniorum
              - - C. hyointestinalis
                - - Campylobacter fetus testudinum
                  - C. fetus
        - - - C. sputorum
            - - - C. gracilis
                - C. hominis
              - - - C. blaseri
                  - C. geochelonis
                - - C. portucalensis
                  - - C. corcagiensis
                    - C. ureolyticus
          - - - C. rectus
              - - C. massiliensis
                - C. showae
            - - - C. anatolicus
                - C. curvus
              - - C. concisus
                - - C. pinnipediorum
                  - - C. mucosalis
                    - - C. majalis
                      - C. suis

120 marker proteins based GTDB 10-RS226

- Campylobacter
  - - C. canadensis Inglis et al. 2007
    - - - - C. insulaenigrae Foster et al. 2004
          - C. volucris Debruyne et al. 2010
        - - C. peloridis Debruyne et al. 2009
          - - C. armoricus Boukerb et al. 2019
            - - C. lari corrig. Benjamin et al. 1984
              - - Campylobacter lari concheus Debruyne et al. 2009
                - - C. ornithocola Caceres et al. 2017
                  - C. subantarcticus Debruyne et al. 2010
      - - - C. avium Rossi et al. 2009
          - C. troglodytis Kaur et al. 2023
        - - C. cuniculorum Zanoni et al. 2009
          - - - C. helveticus Stanley et al. 1993
              - - C. upsaliensis Sandstedt & Ursing 1991
                - C. vulpis Parisi et al. 2021
            - - C. novaezeelandiae Bloomfield et al. 2020
              - - - C. jejuni (Jones, Orcutt & Little 1931) Veron & Chatelain 1973
                  - - C. bilis Phung et al. 2022
                    - C. hepaticus Van et al. 2016
                - - C. coli (Doyle 1948) Veron & Chatelain 1973
                  - - C. estrildidarum Bryant et al. 2021
                    - - C. aviculae Bryant et al. 2021
                      - C. taeniopygiae Bryant et al. 2021
  - - - - - C. rectus (Tanner et al. 1981) Vandamme et al. 1991
          - - C. massiliensis Antezack et al. 2021
            - C. showae Etoh et al. 1993
        - - C. anatolicus Aydin et al. 2022
          - - C. concisus Tanner et al. 1981
            - C. curvus (Tanner, Listgarten & Ebersole 1984) Vandamme et al. 1991
      - - C. suis Lynch et al. 2022
        - - - "C. gastrosuis" Wang et al. 2023
            - C. mucosalis (Lawson et al. 1981) Roop et al. 1985
          - - C. majalis Lynch et al. 2022
            - - C. pinnipediorum caledonicus Gilbert et al. 2017
              - C. pinnipediorum Gilbert et al. 2017
    - - - C. sputorum (Prévot 1940) Veron & Chatelain 1973
        - - - C. gracilis (Tanner et al. 1981) Vandamme et al. 1995
            - C. hominis Lawson et al. 2001
          - - - C. blaseri Gilbert et al. 2018
              - C. geochelonis Piccirillo et al. 2016
            - - C. portucalensis Silva et al. 2021
              - - C. corcagiensis Koziel et al. 2014
                - C. ureolyticus (Jackson & Goodman 1978) Vandamme et al. 2010
      - - - "Ca. C. infans" Bian et al. 2020
          - C. magnus Gruntar et al. 2023
        - - - - C. lanienae Logan et al. 2000
              - C. porcelli Miller et al. 2024
            - - C. devanensis Miller et al. 2024
              - C. vicugnae Miller et al. 2024
          - - C. iguaniorum Gilbert et al. 2015
            - - - C. hyointestinalis Gebhart et al. 1985
                - C. hyointestinalis hyointestinalis lawsonii On et al. 1995
              - - C. fetus testudinum Fitzgerald et al. 2014
                - C. fetus (Smith & Taylor 1919) Sebald & Veron 1963

Campylobacter incertae sedis:

- C. canis Camacho-Suntaxi et al. 2025
- "C. faecalis" Kachler et al. 2000
- "C. felis" Wang et al. 2023
- "C. lawrenceae" Foley et al. 2004
- C. molothri Miller et al. 2025
- "C. ovis" Wang et al. 2023

== Campylobacter-specific bacteriophages ==
Campylobacter-specific bacteriophages are natural viral predators of the organism. Bacteriophages specific to the species now known as C. coli and C. fetus (previously Vibrio coli and V. fetus), were first isolated from cattle and pigs during the 1960s, and Campylobacter bacteriophage therapy is an ongoing area of research in the age of bacterial antibiotic resistance.

== Pathogenesis ==
Campylobacter can cause a gastrointestinal infection, campylobacteriosis. The incubation period is 24–72 hours after infection. This is characterized by an inflammatory, sometimes bloody diarrhea or dysentery syndrome, mostly including cramps, fever, and pain. The most common routes of transmission are fecal-oral, ingestion of contaminated food or water, and the eating of raw meat. Foods implicated in campylobacteriosis include raw or under-cooked poultry, raw dairy products, and contaminated produce. Campylobacter is sensitive to the stomach's normal production of hydrochloric acid: as a result, the infectious dose is relatively high, and the bacteria rarely cause illness when a person is exposed to less than 10,000 organisms. Nevertheless, people taking antacid medication (e. g. people with gastritis or stomach ulcers) are at higher risk of contracting disease from a smaller number of organisms, since this type of medication neutralizes normal gastric acid.

In humans, the sites of tissue injury include the jejunum, the ileum, and the colon. Most strains of C. jejuni produce cytolethal distending toxin, which inhibits cell division and activates inflammatory response from the immune system. This helps the bacteria to survive for a limited time inside intestinal cells and leads to intestinal cell damage. Campylobacter has, on rare occasions, been suggested to cause hemolytic uremic syndrome and thrombotic thrombocytopenic purpura, though no unequivocal case reports exist. Campylobacter infection is the most common trigger of Guillain–Barré syndrome. Gastrointestinal perforation is a rare complication of ileal infection.

Although Campylobacter infection usually presents as gastroenteritis, bloodstream infection may occur, particularly in elderly or immunocompromised patients. In a systematic review and meta-analysis of 25 retrospective observational studies including 2,480 patients with Campylobacter bacteremia, C. jejuni was the most frequently identified species, followed by C. coli and C. fetus. The pooled case-fatality risk was approximately 5%, with higher mortality reported in studies including larger proportions of C. fetus infections, immunocompromised patients, and patients with chronic liver disease.

Campylobacter has also been associated with periodontitis.

== Detection ==
Campylobacter testing needs to be done to manage the risk of foodborne Campylobacter and reducing the level of foodborne Campoboteriosis, to protect people and to determine if a person is infected with Campylobacter.

=== In humans ===
Usually, detection of Campylobacter in humans is done by laboratory culturing a stool sample or swab of the rectum collected by a healthcare provider. Results take about 48–72 hours for preliminary results. Confirmation test and testing to determine the species of Campylobacter or drug sensitivities of the organism require additional time.

=== In livestock ===
Usually, detection of Campylobacter in livestock is done by laboratory culturing a faecal sample. Results take about 48–72 hours.

=== In meat ===
Usually, detection of Campylobacter in meat is done by laboratory culturing a homogenised sample. Results takes about 48–72 hours.

== Treatment ==
The infection is usually self-limiting and, in most cases, symptomatic treatment by liquid and electrolyte replacement is sufficient to treat human infections. Symptoms typically last 5–7 days. Treatment with antibiotics has only a minor effect on the typical duration of the infection in non-complex cases, and is discouraged except in high-risk patients. Diagnosis of campylobacteriosis is made by testing a fecal specimen. Standard treatment in high-risk cases is azithromycin, a macrolide antibiotic, especially for Campylobacter infections in children, although other antibiotics, such as quinolones, tetracycline and other macrolides are sometimes used to treat gastrointestinal Campylobacter infections in adults. In case of systemic infection, other bactericidal antibiotics are used, such as ampicillin, amoxicillin/clavulanic acid, or aminoglycosides. Fluoroquinolone antibiotics, such as ciprofloxacin or levofloxacin, may no longer be effective in some cases, due to resistance. In addition to antibiotics, dehydrated patients may require intravenous fluid treatment in a hospital.

== Epidemiology ==
=== Canada ===
FoodNet Canada has reported that Campylobacter was the most common pathogen found on packaged chicken breast, with nearly half of all samples testing positive. Additionally, Campylobacter and Salmonella were the most common causes of gastrointestinal illness in Canada.

=== Italy ===
In Italy, the annual prevalence of Campylobacter infections appears to be relatively stable based on findings from a national survey conducted on more than 5000 isolates. The survey revealed that the most common species of Campylobacter were C. jejuni, accounting for 83.7% of isolates, followed by C. coli (13.5%) and C. fetus (0.6%). The mean age of affected patients was 34.61 years, with males constituting 57.1% of cases. Outpatients represented the majority of cases, comprising 54% of the total. Campylobacter infections were predominantly isolated from feces, accounting for 97.3% of cases, while a smaller proportion (2.7%) was isolated from blood. Notably, C. fetus was primarily isolated from blood samples, constituting 88.2% of cases. Regarding antibiotic resistance patterns, the survey found that resistance to ciprofloxacin and tetracyclines was relatively high, with rates of 75.5% and 54.8%, respectively. In contrast, resistance to macrolides, including erythromycin, clarithromycin, and azithromycin, was lower, with rates ranging from 2% to 4.8%. Additionally, approximately 50% of C. jejuni and C. coli isolates exhibited resistance to two or more antibiotics. There was a significant decrease in resistance to ciprofloxacin and tetracyclines over time, while resistance to macrolides remained stable.

=== New Zealand ===
In August 2016, an estimated 8,000+ residents of Havelock North, a town with around 13,000 residents, had gastric illness after the water supply was thought to be contaminated by Campylobacter.

=== Norway ===
In June 2019, an estimated 2,000 residents of Askøy Municipality got sick due to the presence of C. jejuni in the water supply. Two deaths were connected to the outbreak, and it was the largest outbreak of Campylobacter in Norway. The suspected source of the contamination was thought to be horse faeces, which leaked into a drinking water pool. A C. jejuni water isolate thought to be the cause of the outbreak was examined with human isolates, and showed the highest pathogenic potential in vitro, transcriptomic and genomic investigations. This could suggest why the isolate was able to cause an outbreak.

=== Sweden ===
During the period of August 2016 to June 2017 there was a large outbreak of C. jejuni in Sweden. It was the largest outbreak that has been reported so far. 5000 more cases than would be expected during this period were reported to the authorities. The source of the outbreak was contaminated chicken meat that came from the same producer. The reason for the increased incidence and elevated levels of Campylobacter was reported to be an improperly installed washing plant, where dirty water was accidentally used to wash transport cages.

=== United Kingdom ===
In January 2013, the UK's Food Standards Agency (FSA) warned that two-thirds of all raw chicken bought from UK shops was contaminated with Campylobacter, affecting an estimated half a million people annually and killing about 100 of them. In June 2014, the FSA started a campaign against washing raw chicken, as washing can spread germs onto clean surfaces by splashing. In May 2015, cumulative results for samples taken from fresh chickens between February 2014 and February 2015 were published by the FSA and showed 73% of chickens tested positive for the presence of Campylobacter.

=== United States ===
Campylobacter infections increased 14% in the United States in 2012 compared to the rate from 2006 to 2008. This represents the highest reported number of infections since calendar year 2000.

High prevalence of Campylobacter (40% or more) has been reported in raw chicken meat in regional retail stores in the US, which remained steady from 2005 to 2011. The last USDA quarterly progress report on Salmonella and Campylobacter testing of meat and poultry, for July–September 2014, showed a low prevalence of Campylobacter spp. in ground chicken meat, but a larger prevalence (20%) in mechanically separated chicken meat (which is sold only for further processing).

== See also ==
- Helicobacter
- List of bacterial orders
- List of bacteria genera
