= Campylobacter lanienae =

Scientific classification
- Domain: Bacteria
- Kingdom: Pseudomonadati
- Phylum: Campylobacterota
- Class: "Campylobacteria"
- Order: Campylobacterales
- Family: Campylobacteraceae
- Genus: Campylobacter
- Species: C. lanienae

Binomial name
- Campylobacter lanienae Logan et al., 2000

Species of bacterium

Campylobacter lanienae is a species of Campylobacter found in humans and other animals. Like other Campylobacter species, it is rod-shaped, non-glucose-fermenting, oxidase- and catalase-positive, Gram-negative and motile.
