= Nitrate reductase test =

The nitrate reductase test is a test to differentiate between bacteria based on their ability or inability to reduce nitrate (NO_{3}^{−}) to nitrite (NO_{2}^{−}) using anaerobic respiration.

== Procedure ==
Various assays for detecting nitrate reduction have been described. One method is performed as follows:

1. Inoculate nitrate broth with an isolate and incubate for 48 hours.
2. Add two nitrate tablets to the sample. If the bacterium produces nitrate reductase, the broth will turn a deep red within 5 minutes at this step.
3. If no color change is observed, then the result is inconclusive. Add a small amount of zinc to the broth. If the solution remains colorless, then both nitrate reductase and nitrite reductase are present. If the solution turns red, nitrate reductase is not present.
