= Campylobacter lari =

Scientific classification
- Domain: Bacteria
- Kingdom: Pseudomonadati
- Phylum: Campylobacterota
- Class: "Campylobacteria"
- Order: Campylobacterales
- Family: Campylobacteraceae
- Genus: Campylobacter
- Species: C. lari

Binomial name
- Campylobacter lari Benjamin et al., 1984

Subspecies
- C. lari subsp. concheus Debruyne et al. 2009; C. lari subsp. lari (Benjamin et al. 1984); Debruyne et al. 2009

Species of bacterium

Campylobacter lari (formerly Campylobacter laridis) is a species of nalidixic acid-resistant, thermophilic, microaerophilic, gram-negative bacteria first isolated from human faeces. It shows anaerobic growth in the presence of trimethylamine N-oxide hydrochloride. Its type strain is NCTC 11352. It is commonly found in sea gulls. In humans, it has been involved in cases of enteritis, severe abdominal pain and terminal bacteremia.

== See also ==
- Campylobacteriosis
