= Campylobacter rectus =

Scientific classification
- Domain: Bacteria
- Kingdom: Pseudomonadati
- Phylum: Campylobacterota
- Class: "Campylobacteria"
- Order: Campylobacterales
- Family: Campylobacteraceae
- Genus: Campylobacter
- Species: C. rectus

Binomial name
- Campylobacter rectus Vandamme et al. 1991

Species of bacterium

Campylobacter rectus is a species of Campylobacter. It is implicated as a pathogen in chronic periodontitis, which can induce bone loss. This motile bacillus is a Gram negative, facultative anaerobe. C. rectus is associated with hypertension together with Prevotella melaninogenica and Veillonella parvula.

It was first described and characterized as Wolinella recta in 1981 after the bacterium was isolated from human patients with gingivitis, periodontitis, and periodontosis. The species name was changed to Campylobacter rectus in 1991 after phylogenetic analyses grouped it closely with other members of rRNA Group I Campylobacter.

== Physiology ==
C. rectus is gram negative, rod-shaped, and anaerobic, although growth in 5% oxygen is possible for some strains. It can use hydrogen and formate for energy, but does not metabolize carbohydrates, and can reduce nitrite. C. rectus is susceptible to multiple classes of antibiotics.

The bacterium is surrounded by a surface-layer, or S-layer, which forms a protective lattice on the surface of the bacterium. The S-layer may be implicated in virulence and in host-bacteria interactions. C. rectus moves using a single flagellum on one pole, and some strains can form biofilms without the loss of motiliy.
