= Wet-tail =

Disease of hamsters

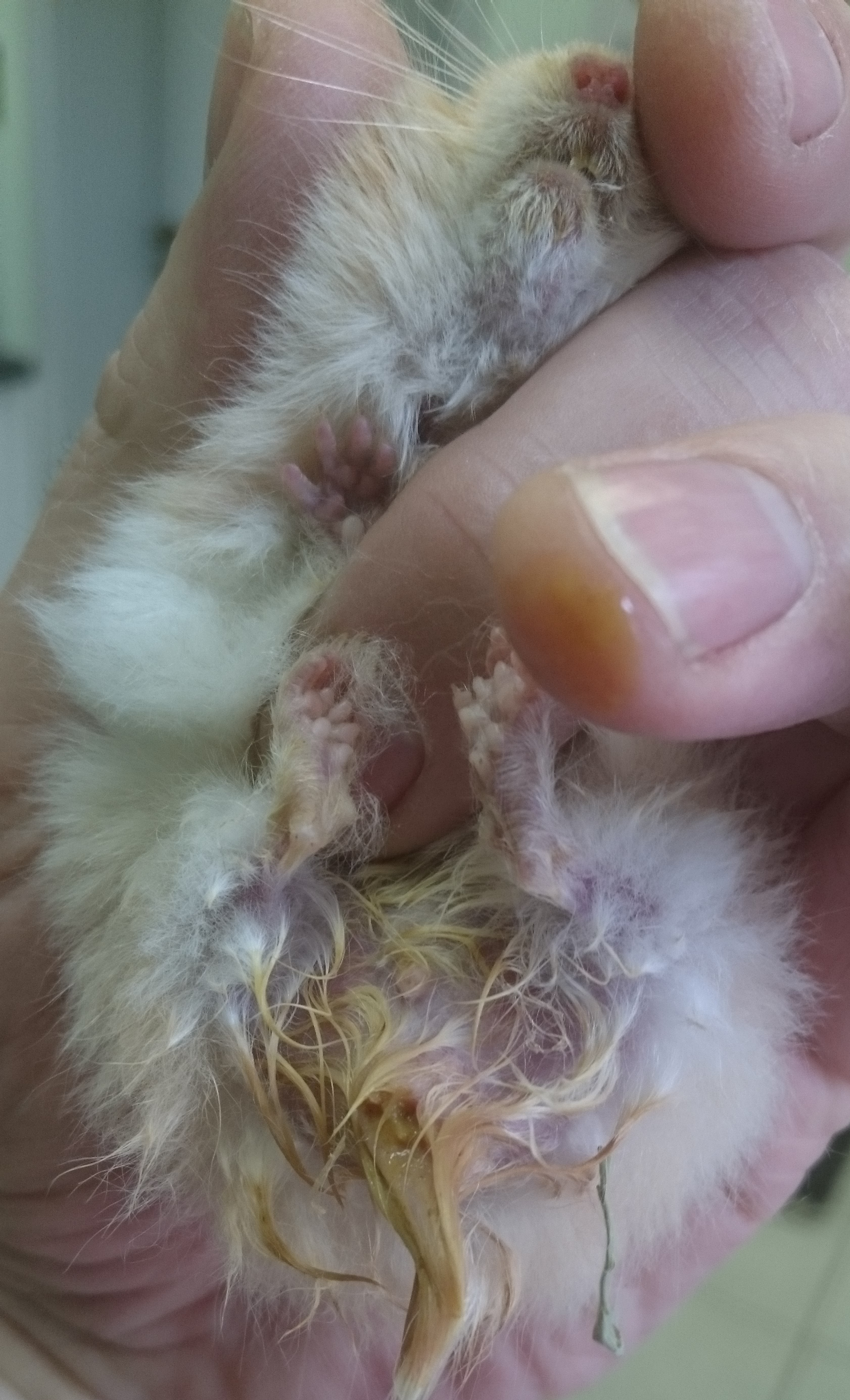
Wet-bottom in a hamster

Wet-tail, wet-bottom or proliferative ileitis, is a disease of hamsters. It is precipitated by stress. Even with treatment, the animal can die within 48 hours. Baby hamsters are much more likely to get the disease than older hamsters. It is commonly found when the hamster is being weaned at about four weeks of age.

== Causes ==
Wet-tail is a disease in the animal's intestines caused by the bacteria, Lawsonia intracellularis. Wet-tail is a stress related illness—such stress can be caused by a variety of factors, including too much handling, change in environment/diet, extremely unclean caging, separation from mother/siblings before they were ready to be weaned, and improper caging.

== Symptoms ==
The symptoms may not appear for several days. The hallmark symptom is a wet tail, matted with faeces. Other signs of the disease are:

- Odor
- Diarrhea
- Lethargy
- Lack of appetite
- Excessive sleeping
- Walking with a hunched back
- Unusual or staggered movement
- Folded ears
- Unusual temper (biting or nipping)

== Treatment ==
Antibiotics can be used to treat wet-tail.
