= Campylobacter coli =

Scientific classification
- Domain: Bacteria
- Kingdom: Pseudomonadati
- Phylum: Campylobacterota
- Class: "Campylobacteria"
- Order: Campylobacterales
- Family: Campylobacteraceae
- Genus: Campylobacter
- Species: C. coli

Binomial name
- Campylobacter coli (Doyle, 1948) Véron and Chatelain, 1973

Species of bacterium

Campylobacter coli is a Gram-negative, microaerophilic, non-endospore-forming, S-shaped bacterial species within the genus Campylobacter. In humans, C. coli can cause campylobacteriosis, a diarrhoeal disease which is the most frequently reported foodborne illness in the European Union. C. coli grows slowly with an optimum temperature of 42 °C. When exposed to air for long periods, they become spherical or coccoid shaped.

== History ==
In 1886, Theodor Escherich established that spiral form bacteria were noted in the stool specimen and large intestinal mucus of neonates (an infant less than 4 weeks), and kittens. However, despite the widespread presence of these bacteria, Campylobacter was not implicated in human diarrhea until 1957. Later, in 1973, it was formally proposed as a novel genus.

=== Pathogenicity and transmission ===
Campylobacter coli are thought to be mainly transmitted to humans via handling and eating raw or undercooked meat or other contaminated food products, but due to their broad natural reservoir, they can also be transmitted via soil and water. Other known sources of Campylobacter infections include food products, such as unpasteurised milk and contaminated fresh produce. The infectious dose of Campylobacter ranges between 1000 and 10,000, but even 500–800 colony forming units (CFU) has also been reported to cause disease. The bacteria can also be transmitted to humans via direct contact with infected animals. Usually the incubation time after ingestion ranges between 24 and 72 hours, but incubation times up to a week have been reported. The adhesion to eukaryotic cells is mediated by several proteins, including the Campylobacter adhesion to fibronectin protein (CadF), which binds specifically to fibronectin in the cell membrane.

==== Virulence factors ====
Campylobacteriosis seems to be dependent on several virulence factors involving adhesion, invasion and bacterial motility adherence. Campylobacter secrete a cytolethal distending toxin (CDT), which is an AB toxin composed of three subunits encoded by cdtA, cdtB and cdtC. This toxin has DNase activity, which causes DNA double-strand breaks during the cell cycle G2 phase, leading eventually to cell apoptosis in HeLa and Caco-2 cells.

==== Survival ====
Campylobacter are microaerophilic, fastidious organisms that become stressed in aerobic condition, temperature variations, osmotic balances, and starvation. However, in the community of Campylobacter species, C. coli has been discovered to be more aerotolerant than C. jejuni; this explains the increasing survival and transmission of the strains during stressful processing and storage conditions (Karki et al., 2019).

== Human infection ==
Campylobacteriosis is characterized by symptoms including high fever, headache, nausea, abdominal cramps, and diarrhoea, sometimes bloody. Foodborne infections caused by Campylobacter spp. can be diagnosed by isolation of the organism from faeces and identification by growth-dependent tests, immunological assays, or genomic analyses.

== Treatment ==
Campylobacteriosis is often self-limiting infection, which is treated according to the symptoms, for example with electrolyte replacement and rehydration. While extra fluid is required of an infected person for as long as the symptoms lasts, antibiotics such as azithromycin or ciprofloxacin can be used to treat risk groups, including immunocompromised patients. Due to the increased antibiotic usage in both animal agriculture and human populations, Campylobacter spp. has been reported to be progressively resistant to several antibiotics, including fluoroquinolones and macrolides. Although most patients recover from the infection, severe post-infectious complications such as Guillain-Barré syndrome, a rare autoimmune condition which causes muscle weakness as a result of the immune system damaging the peripheral nervous system, have been linked to campylobacteriosis.

== See also ==
- List of human flora
