= Campylobacter concisus =

Scientific classification
- Domain: Bacteria
- Kingdom: Pseudomonadati
- Phylum: Campylobacterota
- Class: "Campylobacteria"
- Order: Campylobacterales
- Family: Campylobacteraceae
- Genus: Campylobacter
- Species: C. concisus

Binomial name
- Campylobacter concisus Tanner et al., 1981

Species of bacterium

Campylobacter concisus is a Gram-negative, highly fastidious, mesophilic bacterium that grows under both anaerobic and microaerobic conditions with the presence of hydrogen significantly aiding growth. Motile, with either unipolar or bipolar flagella, the organisms have a characteristic spiral/corkscrew appearance and are oxidase-positive. Although the human oral cavity is the natural colonization site of the bacterium, C. concisus may also colonize the intestinal tract of some individuals. In particular, several studies have reported higher intestinal prevalence of C. concisus in patients with IBD compared to healthy controls, which has led to current speculation of the bacterium's implication in the induction of Crohn's disease.

A number of studies have defined C. concisus to be composed of two phenotypically identical, yet genomically distinct genomospecies by analysis of amplified fragment length polymorphisms (AFLP), housekeeping genes and a PCR method targeting the polymorphisms of C. concisus 23S rRNA gene. The two genomospecies appear to harbor different levels of enteric pathogenic potential, with oral C. concisus strains that were invasive to human epithelial cell line (Caco2) found only in Genomospecies-2 (GS2).

Recently, a C. concisus molecular marker csep1, particularly the csep1 gene with a six-nucleotide insertion (csep1-6bpi) was found to be associated with active Crohn's disease, and pSma1 plasmid was found to be associated with severe ulcerative colitis. The csep1 gene can be located in either the pICON plasmid or the chromosome.
