= Campylobacteriosis =

Infection by Campylobacter bacteria

- Other names: Campylobacter food poisoning, campylobacter enteritis
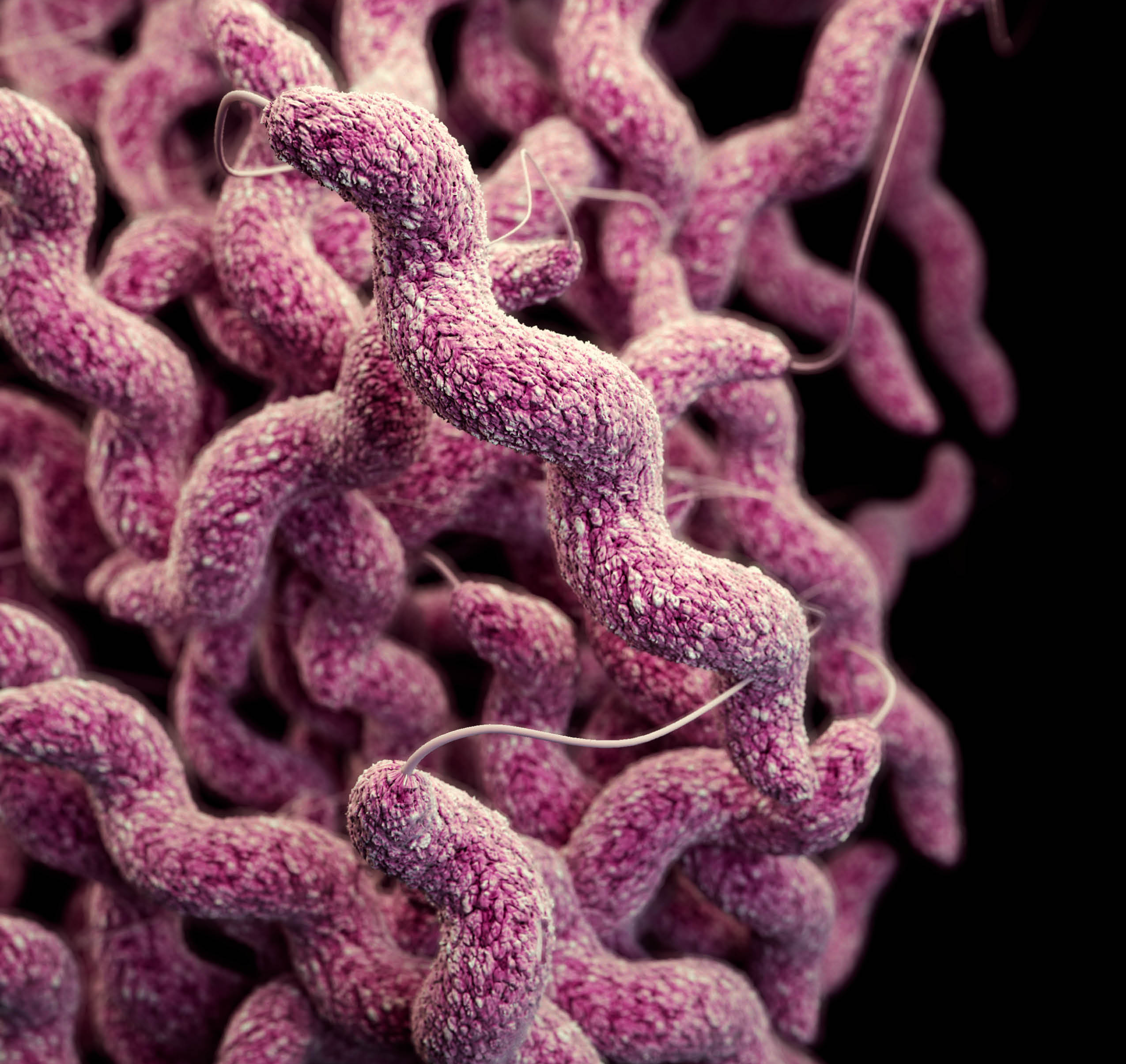
- Specialty: Infectious disease
- Symptoms: Diarrhea, abdominal pain, fever
- Complications: Toxic megacolon, dehydration, sepsis, Guillain–Barré syndrome
- Duration: 2–10 days
- Causes: Campylobacter jejuni
- Treatment: Supportive care, antibiotics (select cases)
- Prognosis: Usually self-limited
- Deaths: Infrequent

Campylobacteriosis is among the most common infections caused by a bacterium in humans, often as a foodborne illness. It is caused by the Campylobacter bacterium, most commonly C. jejuni. It produces an inflammatory, sometimes bloody, diarrhea or dysentery syndrome, and usually cramps, fever and pain.

== Symptoms and signs ==
The prodromal symptoms are fever, headache, and myalgia, which can be severe, lasting as long as 24 hours. After 1–5 days, typically, these are followed by diarrhea (as many as 10 watery, frequently bloody, bowel movements per day) or dysentery, cramps, abdominal pain, and fever as high as 40 °C (104 °F). In most people, the illness lasts for 2–10 days. It is classified as invasive/inflammatory diarrhea, also described as bloody diarrhea or dysentery.

There are other diseases showing similar symptoms. For instance, abdominal pain and tenderness may be very localized, mimicking acute appendicitis. Furthermore, Helicobacter pylori is closely related to Campylobacter and causes peptic ulcer disease.

=== Complications ===
Complications include toxic megacolon, dehydration and sepsis. Such complications generally occur in young children (< 1 year of age) and immunocompromised people. Campylobacter bacteremia occurs mainly in elderly or immunocompromised patients and is associated with a case-fatality risk of 5%, with higher mortality associated with C. fetus infection, immunocompromised status, and chronic liver disease. A chronic course of the disease is possible; this disease process is likely to develop without a distinct acute phase. Chronic campylobacteriosis features a long period of sub-febrile temperature and asthenia; eye damage, arthritis, endocarditis may develop if infection is untreated. Occasional deaths occur in young, previously healthy individuals because of blood volume depletion (due to dehydration), and in people who are elderly or immunocompromised.

Some individuals (1–2 in 100,000 cases) develop Guillain–Barré syndrome, in which the nerves that join the spinal cord and brain to the rest of the body are damaged, sometimes permanently. This appears to be more common with C. jejuni, and especially with specific strains of C. jejuni that are more neurotoxic.

=== Other factors ===
In patients with HIV, infections may be more frequent, may cause prolonged bouts of dirty brown diarrhea, and may be more commonly associated with bacteremia and antibiotic resistance. In participants of unprotected anal intercourse, campylobacteriosis is more localized to the distal end of the colon and may be termed a proctocolitis. The severity and persistence of infection in patients with AIDS and hypogammaglobulinemia indicates that both cell-mediated and humoral immunity are important in preventing and terminating infection.

== Cause ==
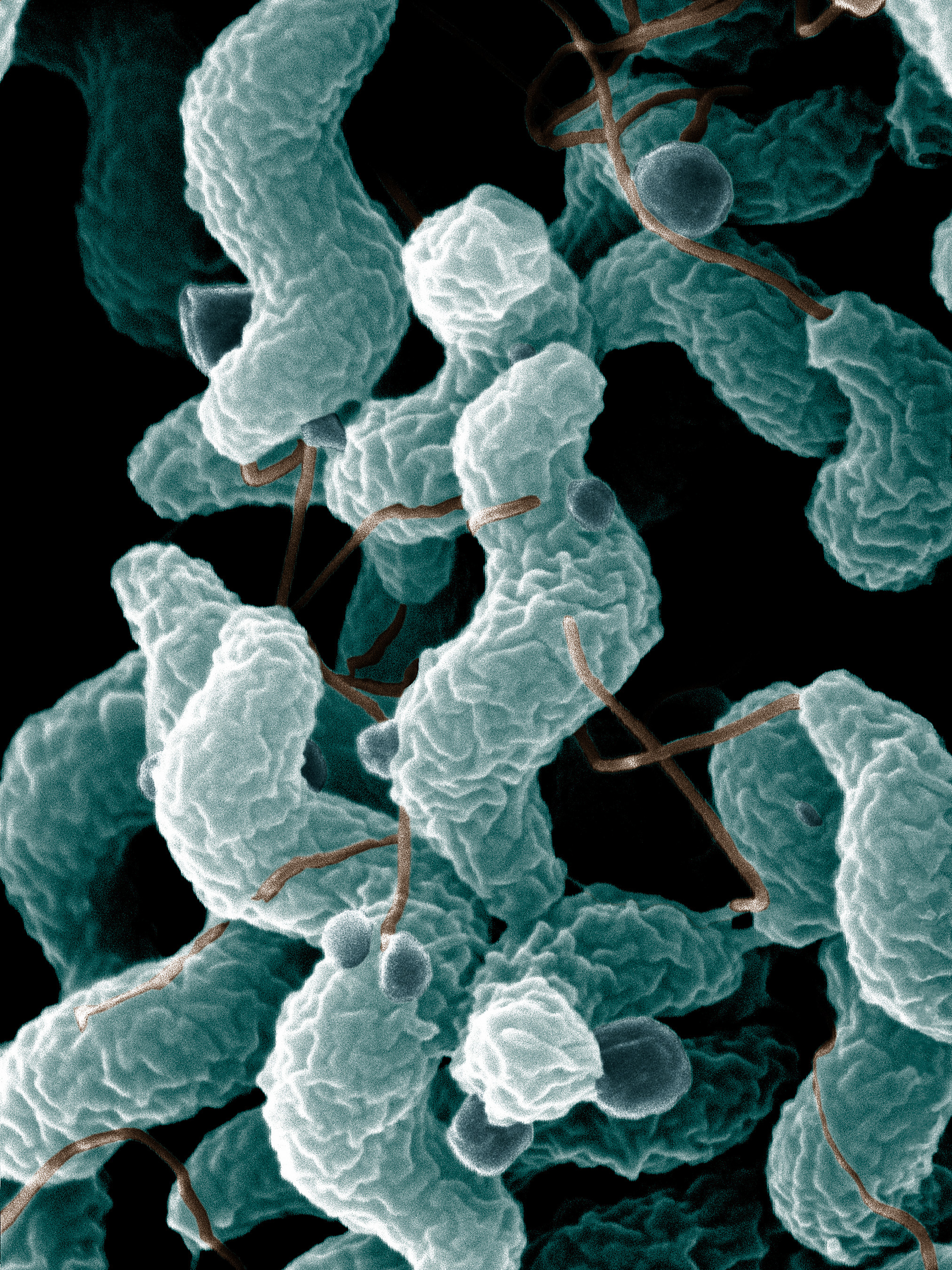
Campylobacter bacteria are the number-one cause of food-related gastrointestinal illness in the United States. This scanning electron microscope image shows the characteristic spiral, or corkscrew, shape of C. jejuni cells and related structures.

Campylobacteriosis is caused by Campylobacter bacteria (curved or spiral, motile, non–spore-forming, Gram-negative rods). The disease is usually caused by C. jejuni, a spiral and comma-shaped bacterium normally found in cattle, swine, and birds, where it is nonpathogenic, but the illness can also be caused by C. coli (also found in cattle, swine, and birds), C. upsaliensis (found in cats and dogs) and C. lari (present in seabirds in particular). One effect of campylobacteriosis is tissue injury in the gut. The sites of tissue injury include the jejunum, the ileum, and the colon. C jejuni appears to achieve this by invading and destroying epithelial cells.

C. jejuni can also cause an autoimmune attack on the peripheral nervous system, which is usually seen several weeks after the infection. The effect is known as an acute idiopathic demyelinating polyneuropathy (AIDP), i.e. Guillain–Barré syndrome, which presents as ascending muscle weakness, and, in the later stages, respiratory failure.

Some strains of C jejuni produce a cholera-like enterotoxin, which is important in watery diarrhea observed in infections. The organism produces diffuse, bloody, edematous, and exudative enteritis. In a small number of cases, the infection may be associated with hemolytic uremic syndrome and thrombotic thrombocytopenic purpura through a poorly understood mechanism.

== Transmission ==
The common routes of transmission for the disease-causing bacteria are fecal-oral, sexual contact (in animals), ingestion of contaminated food (generally unpasteurized (raw) milk and undercooked or poorly handled poultry), and waterborne (i.e., through contaminated drinking water). Contact with contaminated poultry, livestock, or household pets, especially puppies, can also cause disease.

Animals farmed for meat are the main source of campylobacteriosis. A study published in PLoS Genetics (26 September 2008) by researchers from Lancashire, England, and Chicago, Illinois, United States, found that 97 percent of campylobacteriosis cases sampled in Lancashire were caused by bacteria typically found in chicken and livestock. In 57 percent of cases, the bacteria could be traced to chicken, and in 35 percent to cattle. Wild animal and environmental sources were accountable for just three percent of disease.

The infectious dose is 1000–10,000 bacteria (although ten to five hundred bacteria can be enough to infect humans). Campylobacter species are sensitive to hydrochloric acid in the stomach, and acid reduction treatment can reduce the amount of inoculum needed to cause disease.

Exposure to bacteria is often more common during travelling, and therefore campylobacteriosis is a common form of travelers' diarrhea.

== Diagnosis ==
Campylobacter organisms can be detected by performing a Gram stain of a stool sample with high specificity and a sensitivity of ~60%, but are most often diagnosed by stool culture. Fecal leukocytes should be present and indicate the diarrhea to be inflammatory in nature. Well established methods now include antigen testing via EIA or PCR to detect the presence of Campylobacter organisms.

== Prevention ==
- Pasteurization of milk and chlorination of drinking water destroys the organisms.
- Treatment with antibiotics can reduce fecal excretion.
- Infected health care workers should not provide direct patient care.
- Separate cutting boards should be used for foods of animal origin and other foods. After preparing raw food of animal origin, all cutting boards and countertops should be carefully cleaned with soap and hot water.
- Contact with pet saliva and feces should be avoided.

The World Health Organization recommends the following:

- Food should be properly cooked and hot when served.
- Consume only pasteurized or boiled milk and milk products, never raw milk products.
- Make sure that ice is from safe water.
- If you are not sure of the safety of drinking water, boil it, or disinfect it with chemical disinfectant.
- Wash hands thoroughly and frequently with soap, especially after using the toilet and after contact with pets and farm animals.
- Wash fruits and vegetables thoroughly, especially if they are to be eaten raw. Peel fruits and vegetables whenever possible.
- Food handlers, professionals and at home, should observe hygienic rules during food preparation.
- Professional food handlers should immediately report to their employer any fever, diarrhea, vomiting or visible infected skin lesions.

== Treatment ==
The infection is usually self-limiting, and in most cases, symptomatic treatment by liquid and electrolyte replacement is enough in human infections.

=== Antibiotics ===
Antibiotic treatment only has a marginal effect on the duration of symptoms, and its use is not recommended except in high-risk patients with clinical complications.

Erythromycin can be used in children, and tetracycline in adults. Some studies show, however, that erythromycin rapidly eliminates Campylobacter from the stool without affecting the duration of illness. Nevertheless, children with dysentery due to C. jejuni benefit from early treatment with erythromycin. Treatment with antibiotics, therefore, depends on the severity of symptoms. Quinolones are effective if the organism is sensitive, but high rates of quinolone use in livestock mean that quinolones are now largely ineffective.

Antimotility agents, such as loperamide, can lead to prolonged illness or intestinal perforation in any invasive diarrhea, and should be avoided. Trimethoprim/sulfamethoxazole and ampicillin are ineffective against Campylobacter.

=== In animals ===
In the past, poultry infections were often treated by mass administration of enrofloxacin and sarafloxacin for single instances of infection. The FDA banned this practice, as it promoted the development of fluoroquinolone-resistant populations. A major broad-spectrum fluoroquinolone used in humans is ciprofloxacin. The increasing resistance of the Campylobacter to fluoroquinolones and macrolides is of a major concern. A different approach, propagated within the EU is that Campylobacter mitigating measures should be undertaken mainly at the primary production level. An update of potential control options was released by EFSA on 30 April 2020. Vaccination, feed, and water additives, discontinued thinning, employing few and well-trained staff, drinkers that allow standing water, addition of disinfectants to drinking water, hygienic anterooms, designated tools per broiler house were listed as most effective in mitigating the risk of Campylobacter in chicken thus reducing the risk of human campylobacteriosis.

== Prognosis ==
Campylobacteriosis is usually self-limited without any mortality (assuming proper hydration and electrolyte repletion are maintained). The infection is often treated without the use of antibiotics. Fatality rate is low and mostly observed in older and immunocompromised patients. However, there are several possible complications such as Guillain-Barre syndrome, myocarditis and acute reactive arthritis, although such complications are rare.

== Epidemiology ==
Campylobacter is one of the most common causes of human bacterial gastroenteritis. For instance, an estimated 2 million cases of Campylobacter enteritis occur annually in the U.S., accounting for 5–7% of cases of gastroenteritis. Furthermore, in the United Kingdom during 2000, Campylobacter jejuni was involved in 77.3% in all cases of laboratory confirmed foodborne illness. About 20 in every 100,000 people are diagnosed with campylobacteriosis every year, and with many cases going unreported, up to 0.5% of the general population may unknowingly harbor Campylobacter in their gut.

Unfortunately, the true incidence of campylobacteriosis is unknown in most countries, especially developing countries. The reasons are among others underreporting, difficulties with diagnosis and differences in reporting systems in different countries.

A large animal reservoir is present as well, with up to 100% of poultry, including chickens, turkeys, and waterfowl, having asymptomatic infections in their intestinal tracts. Infected chicken feces may contain up to 10^{9} bacteria per 25 grams, and due to the animals' close proximity, the bacteria are rapidly spread to other chickens. This vastly exceeds the infectious dose of 1000–10,000 bacteria for humans.

In January 2013, the UK's Food Standards Agency warned that two-thirds of all raw chicken bought from UK shops was contaminated with campylobacter, affecting an estimated half a million people annually and killing approximately 100.

== Outbreak ==
In August–September 2016, 5,200 people fell ill with campylobacteriosis in Hastings, New Zealand, after the local water supply in Havelock North tested positive for the pathogen Campylobacter jejuni. Four deaths were suspected to be due to the outbreak. It is suspected that after heavy rain fell on 5–6 August, water contamination from flooding caused the outbreak, although this is the subject of a government Inquiry. It is the largest outbreak of waterborne disease ever to occur in New Zealand. All schools in Havelock North closed for two weeks, with the Hastings District Council advising an urgent notice to boil water for at least one minute before consumption. This notice was lifted on 3 September, with the outbreak officially under control.

According to Centers for Disease Control and Prevention, a multistate outbreak of human Campylobacter infection has been reported since 11 September 2017. In all, 55 cases were reported from 12 states (Florida, Kansas, Maryland, Missouri, New Hampshire, New York, Ohio, Pennsylvania, Tennessee, Utah, Wisconsin and Wyoming). Epidemiological and laboratory evidence indicated that puppies sold through Petland stores were a likely source of this outbreak. Out of 55 cases reported, 50 were either employees of Petland or had recently purchased a puppy at Petland, or visited there before illness began. Five people out of 55 cases reported were exposed to puppies from various sources.

Campylobacter can spread through contact with dog feces. It usually does not spread from one person to another. However, activities such as changing an infected person's diapers or sexual contact with an infected person can lead to infection. Regardless of where they are from, any puppies and dogs may carry Campylobacter germs.
