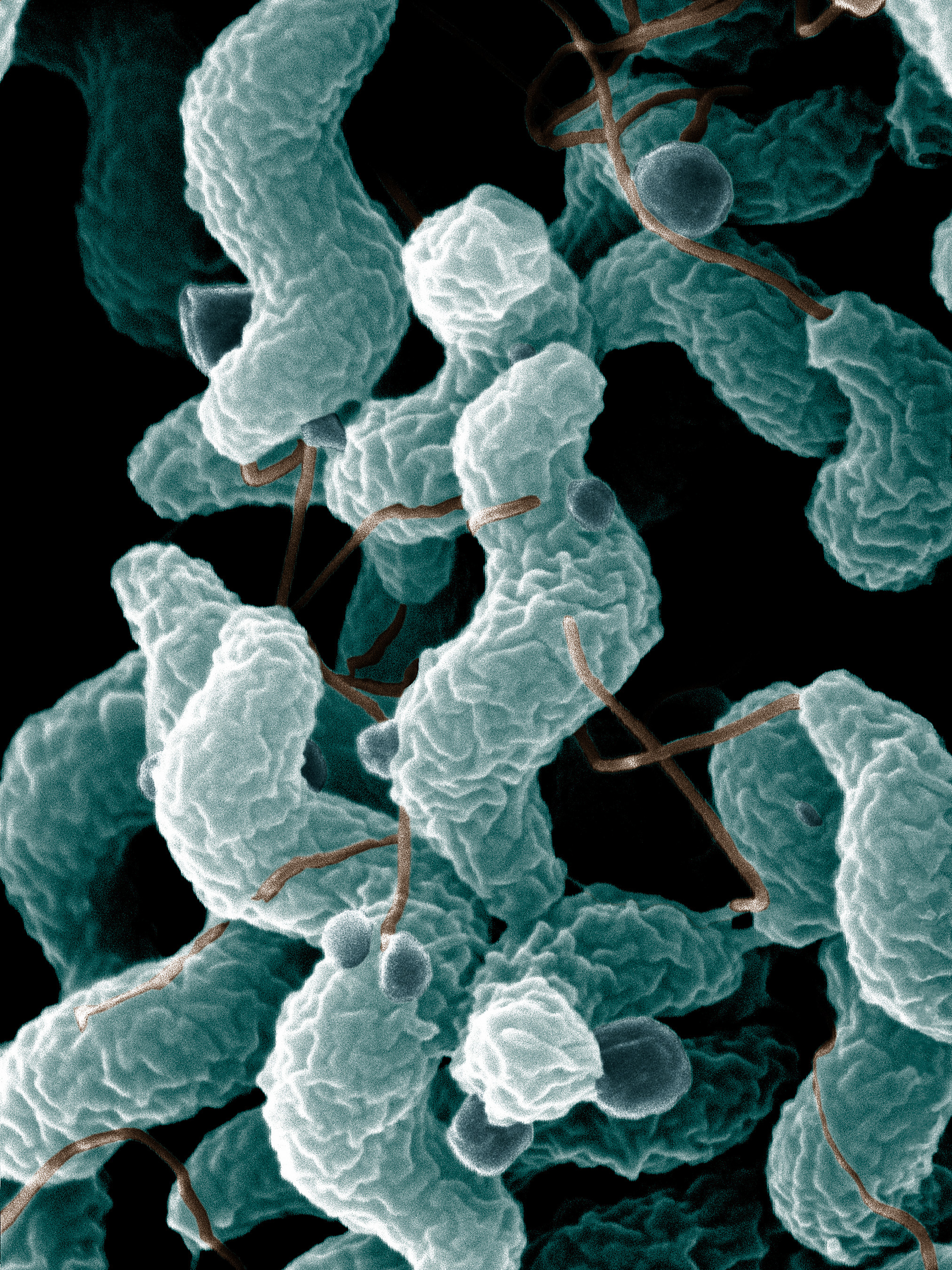

Scientific classification
- Domain: Bacteria
- Kingdom: Pseudomonadati
- Phylum: Campylobacterota
- Class: "Campylobacteria"
- Order: Campylobacterales
- Family: Campylobacteraceae
- Genus: Campylobacter
- Species: C. jejuni

Binomial name
- Campylobacter jejuni (Jones and Little, 1931) Veron & Chatelain, 1973

= Campylobacter jejuni =

Species of bacterium

Campylobacter jejuni is a Gram-negative, helical-shaped, motile, microaerophilic, pathogenic bacterium in the genus Campylobacter. It commonly colonizes the intestinal tracts of poultry and other animals and is a major cause of bacterial gastroenteritis in humans worldwide.

C. jejuni has several characteristics that contribute to its ability to survive and colonize its hosts. Its flagella provide motility though intestinal mucus, while adhesion, invasion, and other virulence mechanisms allow the bacterium to interact with host cells. Its metabolism and genetic variability also enable it to adapt to different conditions within animal and human hosts.

Human infection with C. jejuni is primarily associated with contaminated food or water. The bacterium occurs worldwide, although its prevalence and transmission vary among populations and geographic regions. Although most infections resolve without prolonged illness, complications can occasionally occur, including development of Guillain–Barré syndrome and reactive arthritis.

== History ==
Campylobacter jejuni was originally named Vibrio jejuni in 1931 due to its resemblance to other Vibrio species. In 1963, Sebald and Vérnon proposed the genus Campylobacter based on characteristics such as low levels of guanine and cytosine (G +C), non-fermentative metabolism, and microaerophilic growth requirements. Vibrio jejuni was subsequently transferred to the genus Campylobacter in 1973.

The first well documented outbreak of human Campylobacter infection occurred in 1938, when contaminated milk associated with diarrhea among approximately 355 inmates at two state institutions in Illinois. Although bacteria resembling Campylobacter had been observed in humans as early as 1886, the organisms were first successfully isolated from human stool samples in 1972. Advances in laboratory cultivation techniques during the 1970s helped establish C. jejuni as an important cause of bacterial gastroenteritis.

The genus name Campylobacter means "curved rod", deriving from the Greek words kampylos (curved) and baktron (rod). The species name jejuni was first proposed due to the species' occurrence in infected lesions around the jejunum. Among the species within this genus, C. jejuni is considered important because of its role in human gastrointestinal infections and its worldwide public health significance.

== Metabolism ==
C. jejuni has limited ability to metabolize sugars and relies mainly on amino acids and organic compounds as sources of carbon and energy. Most strains lack key enzymes needed for conventional glycolysis, including glucokinase and 6-phosphofructokinase. Important nutrients include serine, aspartate, and glutamate, while some strains can also utilize asparagine and proline. These nutrients may come from the host or from metabolic products produced by other microorganisms in the gut.

Amino acids taken up C. jejuni feed into central metabolic pathways, including the citric acid cycle, non-oxidative pentose phosphate pathway, gluconeogenesis, and fatty acid synthesis. Serine can be converted to pyruvate by the SdaA dehydratase, while aspartate and glutamate provide intermediates for the citric acid cycle. These pathways supply energy and produce molecules needed for biosynthesis and growth.

When preferred nutrients are limited, C. jejuni can also use acetate and lactate as carbon sources. Lactate produced by other mircoorganisms in the intestinal tract can be converted to pyruvate and used in central metabolism, while acetate can be reused as an additional carbon source.

Energy production occurs through respiration. Oxygen serves as an important terminal electron acceptor under the low oxygen conditions preferred by C. jejuni. The bacterium can also use alternative electron acceptors, including fumarate, nitrate, and certain sulfur- and nitrogen-containing compounds. This respiratory flexibility allows C. jejuni to generate energy under different conditions in the intestinal environment.

== Genome ==
The genome of C. jejuni strain NCTC11168 was first published in 2000. It consists of a circular chromosome 1,641,481 base pairs in length with a G+C content of 30.6%. The original genome analysis predicted 1,654 protein-coding genes and 54 stable RNA species, although later re-annotation revised the number of predicted coding sequences to 1,643.

The genome contains relatively few repeated or phage-associated sequences but includes several hypervariable sequences. Many of these regions occur in genes involved in the production or modification of surface structures, including capsule and lipooligosaccharide. Changes within these regions can alter gene expression and contribute to variation among C. jejuni cells.

== Natural genetic transformation ==
C. jejuni is naturally competent, meaning it can take up DNA from its environment and incorporate it into its genome through natural genetic transformation. The acquired DNA can be incorporated into the bacterial genome by homologous recombination, contributing to genetic variation within the species. This process can also transfer genes associated with antibiotic resistance. Transfer of resistance genes has been reported to occur more frequently in biofilms than between planktonic cells (single cells that float in liquid media).

== Sources ==
C. jejuni commonly colonizes the intestinal tracts of birds and mammals, often without causing disease in the animal host. Poultry is considered the major animal reservoir of C. jejuni, with chickens and other poultry frequently carrying the bacterium in their gastrointestinal tract. C. jejuni is also found in cattle, sheep, dogs, cats, pigs, and several wildlife species. Wild birds can carry genetically diverse strains of C. jejuni and may contribute to its circulation among wildlife, livestock, and surrounding environments.

Outside animal hosts, C. jejuni can be detected in foods and environmental sources contaminated by animal waste. Poultry meat is an important food-associated source, while raw milk, untreated water, and contaminated produce can also contain the bacterium. Its presence in these sources generally reflects contamination originating from colonized animals or their feces.

== Transmission ==
C. jejuni is primarily transmitted to humans by the fecal-oral route. Infection most often occurs after consuming contaminated food or water, especially undercooked poultry. Transmission can also occur through unpasteurized milk, contaminated produce, untreated water, or direct contact with infected animals.

Cross-contamination during food preparation can spread the bacterium from raw poultry to other foods or kitchen surfaces. Person-to-person transmission is uncommon.

== Virulence Factors ==
=== Flagella ===
Flagella are an important virulence factor of C. jejuni that enable motility, biofilm formation, host cell interactions and intestinal colonization in C. jejuni. They also aid in the secretion of proteins involved in infection. Producing flagella requires high energy, so the bacterium must regulate their production. CsrA is a post-transcriptional regulatory protein that binds flaA mRNA to inhibit its translation into FlaA, the major filament of the structure. Studies of csrA mutant strains have identified changes in proteins involved with motility, host cell interactions, stress resistance, and metabolism.

=== Chemotaxis ===
C. jejuni uses chemotaxis to adjust its movement in response to chemical gradients in its environment. It can move toward chemical attractants and away from repellents, helping it respond to favorable and unfavorable conditions.

=== Other virulence factors ===
The pgl locus enables C. jejuni to attach sugar groups and proteins through a process called N-linked glycosylation. This modification affects proteins involved in bacterial functions, including host adherence and invasion. C. jejuni secretes Campylobacter invasive antigens (Cia), which facilitate invasion. The bacteria also produce cytolethal distending toxins (CDT), which damage host cell DNA and can disrupt the cell cycle, leading to cell enlargement, cell cycle arrest, and sometimes apoptosis. The lipopolysaccharide (LPS) of C. jejuni also contributes to virulence by stimulating host inflammatory response.

== Pathogenesis ==
C. jejuni causes disease by moving through the intestinal environment, attaching to intestinal cells, sometimes entering those cells, producing toxins, and triggering inflammation and immune response.

=== Adherence and invasion ===
C. jejuni uses strategies to attach to and breach the intestinal epithelial layer of its host cells. It uses proteases, particularly HtrA, to disrupt cell junctions and cross the epithelial barrier. Host proteins such as fibronectin can serve as binding sites for C. jejuni and facilitate this process. After entering a host cell, C. jejuni can survive inside membrane bound compartments called Campylobacter-containing vacuoles. Host cell transport mechanisms, including dynein, can help move these compartments toward the perinuclear region to avoid lysosomal degradation for up to 72 hours.

=== Toxins and inflammatory mechanisms ===
C. jejuni causes intestinal disease through interactions with gut enterocytes, production of bacterial toxins, and the host's inflammatory response. The best-characterized toxin produced by C. jejuni is cytolethal distending toxin (CDT). Although other toxin-like activities have been investigated, the contribution of individual secreted proteins to the development and severity of human disease is not fully understood.

The structure of C. jejuni's lipopolysaccharide (LPS), particularly its lipid A component, can influence how the immune system responds to the bacterium. Lipid A contains fatty acid chains that help determine how strongly the immune system is activated. One study found that LPS from a C. jejuni strain containing a mixture of lipid A forms caused a moderate inflammatory response in mouse macrophages. Compared with E. coli LPS, it triggered lower levels of inflammatory cytokines. These findings suggest that differences in lipid A structure can influence the strength of immune response, although further research is needed to determine how these findings apply to humans.

=== DNA repair ===
Bile in the intestines can function as a defensive barrier against colonization by C. jejuni. Exposure to the bile acid deoxycholate can induce oxidative stress and double-strand breaks in the DNA of C. jejuni. C. jejuni uses the AddAB DNA repair system to repair double-strand breaks through homologous recombination. Mutants lacking the addAB genes exhibit increased sensitivity to deoxycholate and impaired DNA repair, whereas restoration of addAB function restores resistance to DNA damage from bile.

=== Immune response ===
Infection with C. jejuni stimulates intestinal cells and other components of the immune system to release chemokines, signaling proteins that help recruit immune cells to the site. Inflammatory chemokines such as CXCL1, CCL3/CCL4, CCL2, and CXCL10 are upregulated, further triggering the immune response. One pathway involves ADP-heptose, a bacterial molecule that activates ALPK1 and stimulates inflammatory signaling.

Neutrophil granulocytes use phagocytosis to combat C. jejuni infection, releasing antimicrobial proteins and proinflammatory substances. However, C. jejuni can influence the differentiation process of specific types of neutrophil granulocytes, triggering hypersegmentation and increased reactivity, which leads to delayed apoptosis and higher production of reactive oxygen species.

After infection, B lymphocytes in the body increase the production of antibodies that specifically fight against C. jejuni flagellin. Levels of all immunoglobulin classes rise during infection, with IgA playing a particularly important role because it binds and immobilizes organisms, causing them to aggregate and activate complement proteins that help eliminate the bacteria.

The host immune responses and changes to intestinal environment contribute to the eventual control of the infection. However, the mechanisms responsible for the duration and resolution of infection are complex.

== Disease ==
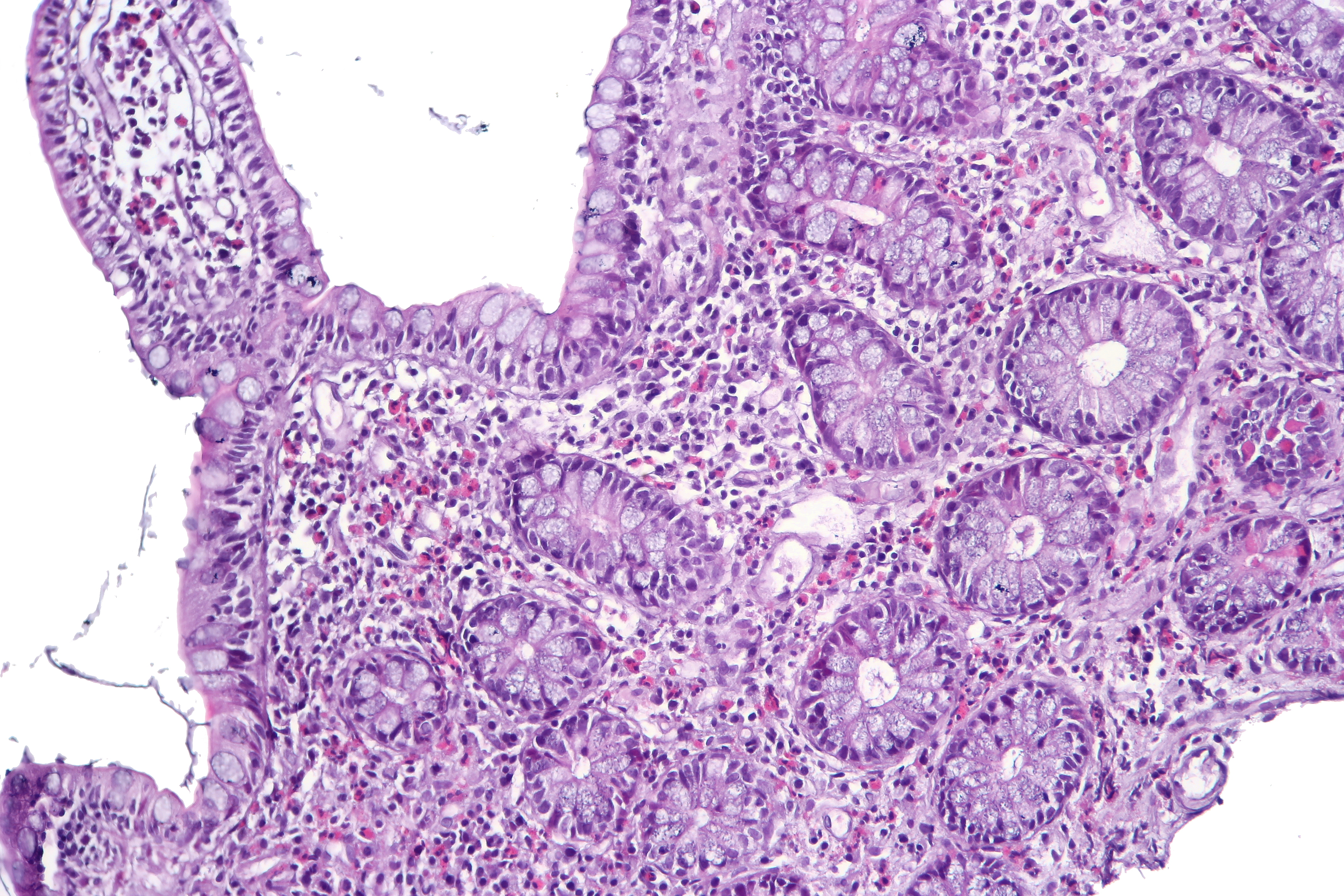
Enteritis, a typical manifestation of a Campylobacter jejuni infection, results in inflammation as pictured above, in which eosinophil aggregation occurs.

Campylobacteriosis is an infectious disease caused by bacteria of the genus Campylobacter. In most patients presenting with campylobacteriosis, symptoms develop within two to five days of exposure to the organism and illness typically lasts seven days following onset. Infection with C. jejuni primarily causes enteritis, or inflammation of the intestine, with symptoms including abdominal pain, diarrhea, fever, and malaise.

Some individuals experience a prodromal phase of symptoms for the first 1 to 3 days, in which the more severe portion of the disease occurs. The prodromal phase presents with symptoms including rigors, high fever, body aches, and dizziness. This is followed by the acute diarrheal phase, which usually lasts around 7 days. Abdominal pain can persist for weeks afterward. The disease is usually self-limiting, meaning that symptoms resolve without prolonged illness. Possible complications of campylobacteriosis include Guillain–Barré syndrome and reactive arthritis.

== Complications ==
Although most Campylobacter infections are limited to the gastrointestinal tract, complications can occasionally occur. Local complications may include cholecystitis, pancreatitis, peritonitis, and gastrointestinal hemorrhage. Extraintestinal manifestations of campylobacter infection are rare and may include meningitis, endocarditis, septic arthritis, osteomyelitis, and neonatal sepsis. Bacteremia is detected in <1% of patients with campylobacter enteritis and is most likely to occur in patients who are immunocompromised or at the extremes of age. Transient bacteremia in immunocompetent hosts with C. jejuni enteritis may be more common but not detected because the killing action rapidly clears most normal human serotypes, and blood cultures are not routinely performed for patients with acute gastrointestinal illness.

=== Guillain–Barré syndome ===
Serious systemic illness caused by campylobacter infection rarely occurs but can lead to sepsis and death. Guillain–Barré syndrome is an uncommon but serious complication of C. jejuni infection which can induce muscle weakness and neuromuscular paralysis. Over time, the paralysis is typically reversible to some extent; nonetheless, about 3-10% of patients with GBS die. GBS can develop after C. jejuni infection because some antibodies produced against the bacterium mistakenly recognize similar molecules on peripheral nerves. This process, known as molecular mimicry, can lead to immune mediated nerve damage.

=== Reactive arthritis ===
Reactive arthritis is a post-infectious inflammatory joint disorder that can develop after Campylobacter infection. It typically affects a small proportion of infected individuals due to its association with a particular genetic make-up. Presence of the human leukocyte antigen B27 (HLA-B27) is associated with increased susceptibility. Symptoms usually develop within several weeks of infection and may persist after gastrointestinal symptoms have resolved.

== Diagnosis ==
Diagnostic tests are available to identify campylobacter infections, including those caused by C. jejuni. The stool culture is considered the gold standard for diagnosing C. jejuni,and selective culture techniques are used to distinguish it from other variants. Stool cultures are grown on specially selective "CAMP" agar plates at 42 °C, the normal avian body temperature, in an atmosphere of 85% N_{2}, 10% CO_{2}, and 5% O_{2}. C. jejuni requires these conditions due to being thermophilic and microaerophilic. A selective blood agar medium (Skirrow's medium) can be used. Greater selectivity can be gained with an infusion of a cocktail of antibiotics: vancomycin, polymixin-B, trimethoprim, and actidione (Preston's agar). A final diagnosis from a stool sample requires a gram stain or phase contrast microscopy.

Aside from stool cultures, C. jejuni can be detected using enzyme immunoassay (EIA) or polymerase chain reaction (PCR). These methods are more sensitive than stool cultures, but PCR tends to be the most sensitive, especially in children and developing countries.

Characteristic	Result
Growth at 25 °C	−
Growth at 35–37 °C	+
Growth at 42 °C	+
Nitrate reduction	+
Catalase test	+
Oxidase test	+
Growth on MacConkey agar	+
Motility (wet mount)	+
Glucose use	−
Hippurate hydrolysis	+
Resistance to nalidixic acid	−
Resistance to cephalothin	+

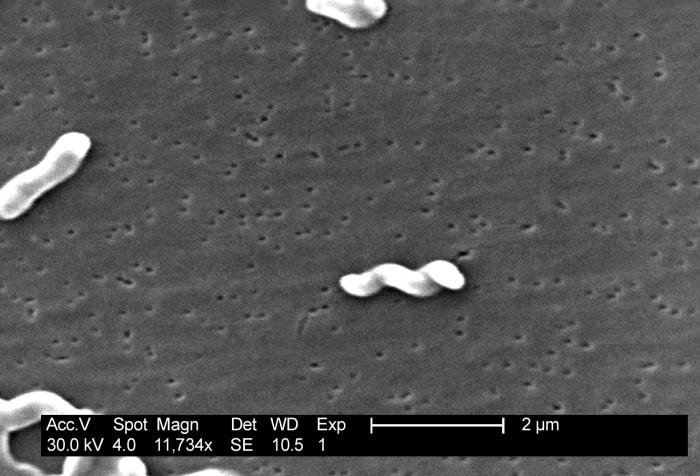
Scanning electron micrograph depicting a number of Campylobacter jejuni bacteria

Suspicious colonies can be identified when oxidase and catalase activity occur. C. jejuni can be readily identified by commercial phenotypic assays. Alternatively, molecular assays based on PCR amplification of the 16S rRNA are also available.

== Treatment ==
Campylobacter infections tend to be mild, requiring only hydration and electrolyte repletion while diarrhea lasts. Maintenance of electrolyte balance, not antibiotic treatment, is the cornerstone of treatment for campylobacter enteritis. Depending on the degree of dehydration, alternate measures may be taken including parenteral methods of hydration.

=== Antibiotic treatment ===
Antibiotic treatment for Campylobacter infections are usually not recommended. Antibiotics are required for treating high-risk patients, including immunocompromised and older individuals. Severe cases exhibiting symptoms such as bloody stools, fever, severe abdominal pain, pregnancy, infection with HIV, and prolonged illness (symptoms that last > 1 week) may also require treatment by antibiotics to help to shorten the duration of the symptoms. Researchers advise to treat these infections with macrolide antibiotics, such as erythromycin or azithromycin. Erythromycin is inexpensive and limits toxic exposure to patients; however, resistance rates are reportedly increasing. Nonetheless, erythromycin use is continued, and resistance rates remain below 6%. Azithromycin usage is increasing due to various drug characteristics, including its once-a-day dosage, tolerability by patients, decreased relation to Infantile hypertrophic pyloric stenosis (IHPS), and less negative side effects compared to erythromycin. Fluoroquinolones are an alternative treatment, however resistance rates are increasing.

=== Antibiotic resistance ===
Fluoroquinolones were first approved as a treatment for Campylobacter infections in 1986, and were later U.S. Food and Drug Administration (FDA) approved in 1996, so as to control infections in poultry flocks. The CDC began monitoring campylobacter in 1997 in the National Antimicrobial Resistance Monitoring System (NARMS). On September 12, 2005, the FDA suspended the use of all fluoroquinolones in poultry production, and the prevalence of campylobacter strains that are fluoroquinolone resistant in poultry flocks, poultry products, production facilities, and human infections became vital to monitor; this was in an effort to determine if the fluoroquinolone ban led to a reduction in the antibiotic-resistant strains. Despite this, data from NARMS indicated ciprofloxacin, a fluoroquinolone, had microbial resistance rates of 17% in 1997–1999, which further increased to 27% in 2015–2017, and now may be as high as 34%. A presence of drug-resistance to ciprofloxacin has been observed in isolate studies, as well as significant drug-resistance among campylobacter to the antibiotics nalidixic acid and tetracyclines. There is a low rate of resistance to erythromycin, the preferred source of antibiotic treatment for campylobacter infections, however resistant strains have been detected in many countries among sources of the origin of food from farm animals.

== Prevention ==
Some simple food-handling practices can help prevent campylobacter infections.

- Cook all poultry products thoroughly. Make sure that the meat is cooked throughout (no longer pink) and any juices run clear. All poultry should be cooked to reach a minimum internal temperature of 165 °F (74 °C).
- Wash hands with soap before preparing food.
- Wash hands with soap after handling raw foods of animal origin and before touching anything else.
- Prevent cross-contamination in the kitchen by using separate cutting boards for foods of animal origin and other foods and by thoroughly cleaning all cutting boards, countertops, and utensils with soap and hot water after preparing raw food of animal origin.
- Do not drink unpasteurized milk or untreated surface water.
- Make sure that people with diarrhea, especially children, wash their hands carefully and frequently with soap to reduce the risk of spreading the infection.
- Wash hands with soap after contact with pet feces.

== Epidemiology ==
==== United States ====
Campylobacter is one of the leading bacterial infections monitored by the Foodborne Disease Active Surveillance Network (FoodNet). In 2024, FoodNet reported 4,312 laboratory diagnosed Campylobacter infections in its historic surveillance area. Of these, 2,310, or 53.6%, were identified as C. jejuni, while 31.7% were not identified to the species level. Beginning in 2024, FoodNEt changed its reporting requirements for Campylobacter to include only culture-confirmed infections, so the 2024 total cannot be directly compared with previous years.

==== Europe ====
Campylobacter infection is the most frequently reported zoonotic gastrointestinal infection in the European Union. In 2024, 168,396 confirmed cases were reported across 26 EU Member States, corresponding to a notification rate of 55.3 cases per 100,000 people. The notification rate increased by 11.9% compared with 2023, and reported an increasing trend between 2020 and 2024.

==== Age ====
C. jejuni infections can occur in people of all ages, although reported incidence varies among age groups and geographic regions. Young children and young adults are frequently among the groups with higher reported incidence in population-based surveillance studies. .
