= Differentiation =

Differentiation may refer to:

== Business ==
- Product differentiation, in marketing
- Differentiated service, a service that varies with the identity of the consumer or the context in which the service is used

== Science, technology, and mathematics ==
=== Biology and medicine ===
- Cellular differentiation, in biology
- Differentiation (journal), a peer-reviewed academic journal covering cell differentiation and cell development
- Developmental biology, the study of the process by which animals and plants grow and develop
- Differentiation therapy, a cancer treatment in which malignant cells are encouraged to differentiate into more mature forms using pharmacological agents

=== Geology ===
- Igneous differentiation, in geology
- Planetary differentiation, in planetary science and geology

=== Social sciences ===
- Differentiation (economics), the process of making a product different from other similar products
- Differentiation (ethnography), the invention of ostensible differences between cultures
- Differentiation (linguistics), in semantics, a meaning shift reached by "adding concepts to the original concepts"
- Differentiation (sociology), a feature of modern society, and way of dealing with complexity
- Differentiated instruction, in education
- Inductive reasoning aptitude, in psychology

=== Other uses in science, technology, and mathematics ===
- Differentiation (mathematics), the process of finding a derivative
- Differentiated security, a form of computer security that deploys different security policies and mechanisms according to the identity and context of a user or transaction

== See also ==
- Difference (disambiguation)
- Different (disambiguation)
- Differentiation of measures (disambiguation)
- Differential (disambiguation)
- : includes undifferentiation and undifferentiated (mostly used in biological or medical terms)
