= Pendleton =

Pendleton may refer to:

== Places ==
=== United Kingdom ===
- Pendleton, Lancashire, England
- Pendleton, Greater Manchester, England

=== United States ===
- Pendleton, Indiana
- Pendleton, Missouri
- Pendleton, New York
- Pendleton, Cincinnati, Ohio, a neighborhood
- Pendleton, Oregon
- Pendleton, South Carolina
- Pendleton, Texas
- Pendleton County, Kentucky
- Pendleton County, West Virginia
- Marine Corps Base Camp Pendleton, Oceanside, California

== Businesses ==
- Pendleton Whisky, a premium Canadian Whisky imported and bottled by Hood River Distillers in Hood River, Oregon
- Pendleton Woolen Mills, Pendleton, Oregon, USA, best known for its Indian blankets and usually-plaid woollen shirts
- Pendleton's Lithography, Boston, established by William S. Pendleton (1795–1879) and John B. Pendleton (1798–1866)

== Other uses ==
- Pendleton (name)
- SS Pendleton, a tanker ship that broke in two off the coast of Chatham, Massachusetts, as depicted in The Finest Hours
- Pendleton Civil Service Reform Act, 1883 law of the US Congress establishing the United States Civil Service Commission
- Pendleton Correctional Facility, a prison in Pendleton, Indiana
- Pendleton Airport, near Ottawa, Canada
- Pendleton (band), a punk band from Manchester, England
- Pendleton 8, a nickname given to eight soldiers involved in the Hamdania incident
- Pendleton Round-Up, a major annual rodeo incorporated in 1911
- Pendelton State University, fictional university on the sitcom 3rd Rock from the Sun (note different spelling)
- Pendleton University, fictional university in the 1998 slasher horror film Urban Legend
- Pendleton "Sir Pentious", a fictional character in Hazbin Hotel
