= Otherwise =

Otherwise may refer to:

- Otherwise (band), a rock band from Las Vegas, Nevada
- E's Otherwise, 2003 anime television series adaptation of E's
- "Otherwise" (Futurama), an episode of the eighth production season of Futurama

== See also ==
- Difference (disambiguation)
