= Angry Penguin Productions =

Angry Penguin Productions is a Rochester, New York based multimedia company, founded in 2002 by Antonio Esteves and Jonathan Bernier.

== Beginning ==
Angry Penguin was first started in 2002 when Bernier and Esteves started promoting local music shows (particularly of the Punk Rock, Emo and Metal variety) around the Westchester County, New York area. The two felt their area lacked in variety of music shows and took matters into their own hands. The name they choose as their promotion guise was Angry Penguin and the pair started putting on and promoting one to two shows a week. Their shows took place mainly in bars and occasionally VFW halls. Many of the bands who played early Angry Penguin shows have gone on to great success, including Plain White T's, Comeback Kid and Kevin Devine.

=== Angry Penguin Records ===
In 2004, Bernier and Esteves started Angry Penguin Records, an independent record label. As the label had no distribution deal, all albums are sold through festival appearances, music concerts and their website.

Angry Penguin's first signing was Dr. Hourai, a progressive metal band from the greater Westchester County, New York area. Their first album, Post Apocalyptic Nightmare Volume One: Vibrations in Hyperspace EP was recorded at The Loft studios in Bronxville, New York in early 2004. The label began what would become a long-running tradition of promoting both themselves and their signed acts on the Warped Tour in Summer 2004.

In 2007, Angry Penguin Records signed Manchester, England's Pendleton, a 4-piece punk rock band. Their first recording (done in England), You, by Us, was re-issued in the states by Angry Penguin. The band toured the US on the Vans Warped Tour 2007, followed by a self-booked tour, also in the US. In the spring of 2008, Pendleton came back to the states to record their sophomore release The Difference. The album was done by producer John Naclerio at Nada Recording Studios in New Windsor, New York.

=== Rage Fest ===
In 2009, Angry Penguin Productions sponsored the first ever Rage Fest, a hardcore and metal daylong music festival at Rochester's Water Street Music Hall on August 28. It featured over 15 local bands, including Sirens and Sailors, June Rising, Storm The Bay and Makyo Star.

It has been announced on Angry Penguin's official blog, that the second annual Rage Fest will take place on August 27, 2010, at Water Street Music Hall

== Angry Penguin (character) ==
The Angry Penguin is a fictional character, found in The Angry Penguin comic book series. He is portrayed as having a prominent rage problem, cemented with the tagline "More Violent Than He Needs To Be." Because he is still a developing character, the whereabouts of his origin are unknown, as well as the motive behind his quest for world domination.

=== Webcomic ===
Angry Penguin Productions has released four issues of the Angry Penguin webcomic on their website. These have been short, sequential series. All four have been illustrated by Peter Lazarski and written by Esteves and Bernier. In a recent review, the website Geek Girl on the Street hinted at purposeful political undertones being present in the comic, though Angry Penguin Productions has yet to respond to the allegation.

==== Volume 1 ====
- Issue 1: It Takes an Angry Penguin to Raise a Village.
- Issue 2: And in this Iron Corner
- Issue 3: Awakening

==== Volume 2 ====
- Issue 1: The Glowing Sarcophagus

=== Festival appearances ===
Angry Penguin annually makes appearances on the entire Vans Warped Tour and at New York Comic Con. In 2010, the company also appeared at C2E2 and San Francisco's Wondercon.

=== Clothing line ===
The Angry Penguin appears on a line of adult clothing, including T-shirts, hooded sweatshirts, tank tops as well as women's "booty shorts", T-shirts, long sleeved shirts and more. The items depict the Angry Penguin in a variety of circumstances, as well as his enemies and weapons.

== Sponsored bands ==
- Polar Bear Club
- Protest The Hero
- Pendleton (band)
