= List of shipwrecks in November 1857 =

The list of shipwrecks in November 1857 includes ships sunk, wrecked or otherwise lost during November 1857.

== 1 November ==
List of shipwrecks: 1 November 1857
Ship	State	Description
Cumberland Lass	United Kingdom	The ship was driven ashore at Wells-next-the-Sea, Norfolk.
Emma Helene	United Kingdom	The ship was severely damaged in a typhoon at Hong Kong, China. She was on a voyage from Newcastle upon Tyne, Northumberland to Hong Kong.
Faithful Westwater	United Kingdom	The ship ran aground on the Sunk Sand, in the North Sea off the coast of Essex. She was on a voyage from South Shields, County Durham to Barcelona, Spain. She was refloated with assistance from the smack Aid (United Kingdom) and taken in to Harwich, Essex.
Greenwell	United Kingdom	The ship ran aground on the Salvo Reef, in the Baltic Sea off the coast of Sweden. She was on a voyage from Kronstadt, Russia to London. She was refloated on 3 November but consequently had to be beached on Fårö, where she was wrecked. Her crew were rescued.
Helene	Netherlands	The ship was driven ashore in the Yangtze at Breaker's Point. She was attacked and plundered by pirates. Her crew were rescued. She was on a voyage from Hong Kong to Shanghai, China.
Quebec Packet	United Kingdom	The brig ran aground on Scroby Sands, Norfolk. She was on a voyage from South Shields, County Durham to London. She was refloated and taken in to Great Yarmouth, Norfolk.

== 2 November ==
List of shipwrecks: 2 November 1857
Ship	State	Description
Alliance	United Kingdom	The brig ran aground on the Scroby Sands, Norfolk. She was on a voyage from Sunderland, County Durham to Boulogne, Pas-de-Calais, France. She was refloated and put in to Great Yarmouth, Norfolk.
Anne Christine	Sweden	The ship was driven ashore and wrecked on Skagen, Denmark. Her crew were rescued. She was on a voyage from South Shields, County Durham to Stockholm.
Eugene	France	The full-rigged ship was wrecked off Kistnapatam, India with the loss of nine of her crew.
Grand Bey	France	The full-rigged ship was wrecked off Coratoor, India with the loss of ten of her crew.
Gratitude	United Kingdom	The ship was driven ashore with the loss of four lives. There were more than 100 survivors. She was on a voyage from Macao, China to Singapore, Straits Settlements and Penang, Malaya.
Johanne	Danzig	The ship was driven ashore on Skagen. She was on a voyage from London, United Kingdom to Danzig. She was refloated and taken in to Fredrikshavn, Denmark for repairs.
Robert Irving	United Kingdom	The ship sprang a leak and was beached near Fleetwood, Lancashire. She was on a voyage from Saltney, Cheshire to Greenock, Renfrewshire.
Rodfina Rodina	Netherlands	The ship foundered in the Black Sea. She was on a voyage from Sulina, Ottoman Empire to Falmouth, Cornwall, United Kingdom.
Waters	United Kingdom	The brig ran aground at Sunderland. She was on a voyage from London to Sunderland. She was refloated and taken in to Sunderland in a leaky condition.

== 4 November ==
List of shipwrecks: 4 November 1857
Ship	State	Description
Fa-dien	Norway	The barque was abandoned in the North Sea. Her crew were rescued.
Frederick	United Kingdom	The smack was abandoned off Lundy Island, Devon. She was towed in to Clovelly, Devon.
Northern Light	United States	The ship was abandoned in the Atlantic Ocean. Five crew were rescued by Star (United Kingdom). Northern Light was on a voyage from Norfolk, Virginia to Barbados.
Providence	France	The schooner ran aground on the Longsand, in the North Sea off the coast of Essex. Her crew were rescued by Celerity (United Kingdom). Providence was on a voyage from Newcastle upon Tyne, Northumberland, United Kingdom to Cette, Hérault.

== 5 November ==
List of shipwrecks: 5 November 1857
Ship	State	Description
Belmont	United Kingdom	The brig foundered off Happisburgh, Norfolk. Her crew were rescued. She was on a voyage from Sunderland, County Durham to Middlesbrough, Yorkshire.
Duo Fratres	Norway	The ship ran aground on the Goodwin Sands, Kent, United Kingdom. She was on a voyage from Newcastle upon Tyne, Northumberland, United Kingdom to Barcelona, Spain. She was refloated and taken in to Ramsgate, Kent.
Elizabeth	United Kingdom	The smack was abandoned in the Irish Sea 35 nautical miles (65 km) off the Isle of Man. Her crew were rescued. She was on a voyage from Barrow-in-Furness, Lancashire to Neath, Glamorgan.
Ida	Denmark	The brig ran aground on the Goodwin Sands. She was on a voyage from Hartlepool, County Durham to Rio de Janeiro, Brazil. She was refloated and towen in to Ramsgate, Kent by the tug Aid (United Kingdom).
Laconia	United Kingdom	The steamship ran aground at Smyrna, Ottoman Empire. She was on a voyage from Smyrna to Liverpool, Lancashire. She was refloated with the assistance of a French Navy steamship and resumed her voyage.
Matchless	United Kingdom	The lugger was driven ashore and severely damaged at Wells-next-the-Sea, Norfolk.
Saucy Lass	United Kingdom	The lugger was driven ashore at Wells-next-the-Sea.

== 6 November ==
List of shipwrecks: 6 November 1857
Ship	State	Description
Bull	(United Kingdom of Great Britain and Ireland) British North America	The brig ran aground on the Arklow Bank, in the Irish Sea off the coast of County Wicklow. She was on a voyage from Glasgow, Renfrewshire to Marseille, Bouches-du-Rhône, France. She was refloated and towed in to Dublin in a leaky condition.
Eleanor Lancaster	United Kingdom	The ship was wrecked off Newcastle, New South Wales. Her crew were rescued.
George Fyffe	United Kingdom	The barque ran aground on the Herd Sand, in the North Sea off the coast of County Durham. All on board were rescued by the South Shields Lifeboat. She was on a voyage from Quebec City, Province of Canada, British North America to South Shields, County Durham. She broke up on 24 November.
Morton	United Kingdom	The schooner was wrecked on the Gull Rock, off St Ives, Cornwall. Three crew were rescued by Swift (United Kingdom), the remainder reached shore. Morton was on a voyage from Swansea, Glamorgan to Portreath, Cornwall.
Peace	United Kingdom	The ship ran aground at South Shields, County Durham. She was refloated and put back to South Shields in a leaky condition.

== 7 November ==
List of shipwrecks: 7 November 1857
Ship	State	Description
Anna Elizabeth	Netherlands	The barque was wrecked on the North Sands, in the Strait of Malacca. Her crew were rescued by the steamship Hooghly ( India). Anna Elizabeth was on a voyage from Akyab, Burma to Hong Kong, China.
Burlington	United Kingdom	The steamship ran aground on Graskar, off Porvoo, Grand Duchy of Finland. She was on a voyage from Kronstadt, Russia to Hull, Yorkshire. She had floated off and sunk by 24 November.
Cove	United Kingdom	The brig ran aground on the Gunfleet Sand, in the North Sea off the coast of Essex. She was on a voyage from Blyth, Northumberland to London. She was refloated with the assistance of eight smacks and beached at Sheerness, Kent. She was refloated on 12 November and towed in to London by the steamship City of Rochester (United Kingdom).
Devonshire	United Kingdom	The steamship ran aground on the Goodwin Sands, Kent. She was refloated.
Duo Fratres	Norway	The brig ran aground on the Goodwin Sands. She was on a voyage from Newcastle upon Tyne, Northumberland, United Kingdom to Barcelona, Spain. She was refloated and taken in to Ramsgate, Kent with the assistance of a Deal lugger.
J. W. Fannin	United States	The ship ran aground at Galveston, Texas.
Nebraska	United States	The ship ran aground at Galveston and was wrecked.
Peace	United Kingdom	The ship ran aground at South Shields, County Durham. She was refloated and put back to South Shields in a leaky condition.
Polynesia	United Kingdom	The ship was driven ashore at Bershan's Point, Province of Canada, British North America. She was on a voyage from Quebec City, Province of Canada to Newry, County Antrim. She was later refloated, but drove ashore again and was condemned. Polynesia was refloated and taken in to Quebec City in early July 1858.
Stjerma	Norway	The ship ran aground on the Oregrund and was wrecked. She was on a voyage from Gävle, Sweden to London, United Kingdom.
Tyne	United Kingdom	The fishing smack ran aground and sank at North Shields, County Durham. She was later refloated.
Willem III	Netherlands	The steamship collided with the steamship Normandy (France) and partly sank 3 leagues (9 nautical miles (17 km)) east of Málaga, Spain. She was on a voyage from Marseille, Bouches-du-Rhône, France to Amsterdam, North Holland.
Young America	United Kingdom	The full-rigged ship was driven ashore at Dungeness, Kent. She was on a voyage from Rangoon, Burma to Bremen. She was refloated and resumed her voyage.

== 8 November ==
List of shipwrecks: 8 November 1857
Ship	State	Description
Constitution	Chile	The steamship was wrecked at the mouth of the Maule River. Her crew were rescued.
Svea	Sweden	The ship was driven ashore at Dungeness, Kent, United Kingdom. She was on a voyage from Gothenburg to Algiers, Algeria. She was refloated and taken in to Ramsgate, Kent.

== 9 November ==
List of shipwrecks: 9 November 1857
Ship	State	Description
Concordia	Hamburg	The ship ran aground at Wick, Caithness, United Kingdom. She was on a voyage from Wick to Altona. She was refloated and resumed her voyage, but consequently put in to Leith, Lothian, United Kingdom in a severely leaky condition.
Golden Age	(United Kingdom of Great Britain and Ireland) British North America	The ship capsized in a squall in the Atlantic Ocean with the loss of all but one of her crew. The survivor was taken off the wreck on 22 November by Reindeer (United Kingdom). Golden Age was on a voyage from Halifax, Nova Scotia to Ponce, Puerto Rico.
Matilda Wattenbach	United Kingdom	The ship was holed by her anchor and ran aground at Calcutta, India. She was on a voyage from Calcutta to London. She was refloated and placed under repair.
New Great Britain	United Kingdom	The ship was driven ashore at Dunnose, Isle of Wight. She was on a voyage from London to China. She was refloated and taken in to Southampton, Hampshire in a leaky condition.

== 10 November ==
List of shipwrecks: 10 November 1857
Ship	State	Description
Anna	Netherlands	The ship ran aground on the Long Sand or the Kentish Knock and was abandoned. Her crew were rescued. She was on a voyage from Amsterdam, North Holland to Surinam.
Anna Margaretha	United Kingdom	The collier, a galiot, sprang a leak and foundered in the North Sea 8 nautical miles (15 km) off the Heugh Lighthouse, County Durham. Her crew survived. She was on a voyage from Leith, Lothian to Bordeaux, Gironde, France.
Emma	Hamburg	The barque was driven ashore at New Romney, Kent, United Kingdom. She was on a voyage from Hamburg to "Donna Francisca". She was refloated and put in to Ramsgate, Kent.
Jeremiah Thompson	United States	The ship caught fire at New York and was scuttled. She was refloated on 16 November.
Lady Londesborough	United Kingdom	The ship was driven ashore at Dimlington, Yorkshire. She was refloated on 14 November.
Mercury	United Kingdom	The brig was wrecked on the Barber Sand, in the North Sea off the coast of Norfolk. Her crew were rescued by a yawl. She was on a voyage from Sunderland, County Durham to London.

== 11 November ==
List of shipwrecks: 11 November 1857
Ship	State	Description
Cumberland	United Kingdom	The barque was abandoned in the Atlantic Ocean. She was on a voyage from Africa to Liverpool, Lancashire.
Eureka	United Kingdom	The schooner was driven ashore on the north coast of the Stevns Peninsula, Denmark. She was on a voyage from Stettin to London. She was refloated the next day and resumed her voyage.
North Star	United Kingdom	The brig ran aground on the Poll Sand, in the English Channel off the coast of Devon. She was on a voyage from London to Buenos Aires, Argentina. She was refloated and taken in to Exmouth, Devon.
Sarah Sands	United Kingdom	The steamship was damaged by fire in the Indian Ocean. She was on a voyage from Portsmouth, Hampshire to India. She put in to Mauritius on 23 November for repairs.

== 12 November ==
List of shipwrecks: 12 November 1857
Ship	State	Description
Catherine	United Kingdom	The Mersey Flat was run into by the steamship Alp (United Kingdom) and sank at Liverpool, Lancashire with the loss of her captain.
Colony	United Kingdom	The brig was in collision with Babee ( (United Kingdom of Great Britain and Ireland) Jersey) and sank in the River Yare at Great Yarmouth, Norfolk with the loss of a crew member. She was on a voyage from South Shields, County Durham to London.
Lilburno	Austrian Empire	The barque was wrecked at "Heckla". She was on a voyage from Taganrog, Russia to a British port.
Pioneer	United Kingdom	The ship ran aground near Ballyraine, County Donegal and capsized. She was on a voyage from Ballyraine to Liverpool.

== 13 November ==
List of shipwrecks: 13 November 1857
Ship	State	Description
Cornelius	Netherlands	The brig was driven ashore at Punta Mala, Spain. She was on a voyage from Trieste to Valparaíso, Chile. She was refloated with assistance from Earl of Lonsdale (United Kingdom) and towed in to Gibraltar Bay.
Elizabeth	United Kingdom	The ship was destroyed by fire at Iquique, Chile with the loss of a crew member.
Helice	France	The steamship was in collision with the steamship Ville de Havre (France) and sank in the Seine. Her crew were rescued by Ville de Havre.
Liddesdale	United Kingdom	The barque ran aground on the Longsand, in the North Sea off the coast of Essex. She was abandoned the next day; all on board were rescued. She was on a voyage from South Shields, County Durham to Aden.
Pearl	United Kingdom	The barque was driven ashore at Sheringham, Norfolk. She was on a voyage from South Shields, County Durham to Cartagena, Spain. She was refloated the next day and taken in to Great Yarmouth, Norfolk in a leaky condition.
Sedulous	United Kingdom	The full-rigged ship ran aground on the London Chest, in the Baltic Sea and was wrecked.

== 14 November ==
List of shipwrecks: 14 November 1857
Ship	State	Description
Britannia	United Kingdom	The smack was driven ashore and severely damaged at Hornsea, Yorkshire. She was on a voyage from South Shields, County Durham to London. She had broken up by 3 December.
La Belle	United Kingdom	The ship was sighted between Crane Island and Gross Island whilst on a voyage from Quebec City, Province of Canada, British North America to London. No further trace, presumed foundered with the loss of all hands.
Pearl	United Kingdom	The ship was driven ashore at Sheringham, Norfolk. She was on a voyage from Sunderland, County Durham to Cartagena, Spain. She was refloated and towed in to Great Yarmouth, Norfolk in a leaky condition.

== 15 November ==
List of shipwrecks: 15 November 1857
Ship	State	Description
John Taylor	United Kingdom	The full-rigged ship was sighted in the Strait of Sunda whilst on a voyage from Shanghai, China to Liverpool, Lancashire. No further trace, presumed foundered with the loss of all hands.
Maria Louisa	Netherlands	The galiot was wrecked on the Longsand, in the North Sea off the coast of Essex, United Kingdom. Her crew were reported missing. She was on a voyage from Newcastle upon Tyne, Northumberland, United Kingdom to Genoa, Kingdom of Sardinia
Tyne	United Kingdom	The yawl was wrecked on the Herd Sand, in the North Sea off the coast of County Durham. Her crew were rescued. She was on a voyage from South Shields, County Durham to Scarborough, Yorkshire.

== 16 November ==
List of shipwrecks: 16 November 1857
Ship	State	Description
Falcon	United Kingdom	The full-rigged ship was driven ashore and wrecked 20 nautical miles (37 km) east of "Howhr", on the Arabian Peninsula. She was on a voyage from Aden to the "Kooria Moorias" (Khuriya Muriya Islands).
Hamburgh Packet	Norway	The schooner ran aground on the Herd Sand, in the North Sea off the coast of County Durham, United Kingdom. She was refloated the next day.
Julia	Spain	The ship was wrecked on the Goodwin Sands, Kent, United Kingdom. Her crew were rescued.
New Isabella	United Kingdom	The brig was driven ashore at Sunderland, County Durham. She was on a voyage from Great Yarmouth, Norfolk to Sunderland. She was refloated on 24 November.
Sophia	United Kingdom	The barque capsized and sank in the South China Sea 50 nautical miles (93 km) east of The Saddles with the loss of seven or eight of her crew. She was on a voyage from Shanghai to Amoy, Swatow, China.
Unicorn	United Kingdom	The schooner foundered off Whitby, Yorkshire. Her crew were rescued by the schooner France (France). Unicorn was on a voyage from Warkworth, Northumberland to Terneuzen, Zeeland, Netherlands.
Waverley	United Kingdom	The full-rigged ship capsized in the South China Sea. She was on a voyage from Shanghai to China. About 300 people were taken off by Intrepid and the schooner Nora (both United Kingdom).
Witch	United Kingdom	The barque was driven ashore on the south east coast of Gotland, Sweden. She was on a voyage from Riga, Russia to Leith, Lothian. She had been refloated by 23 November and taken in to "Steldharm" for repairs.

== 17 November ==
List of shipwrecks: 17 November 1857
Ship	State	Description
Arabian	United States	The ship was driven ashore and wrecked on Hilton Head Island, South Carolina. Her crew were rescued by United States United States Revenue Cutter Service.
Dorothea	United Kingdom	The brig ran aground on the Tongue Sand and sank. Her crew were rescued. She was on a voyage from London to Saint Vincent.
Eliza	Kingdom of Hanover	The galiot was in collision with the steamship Ernestine (United Kingdom with the loss of two of her five crew. Two crew were rescued by Ernestine, one was left aboad Eliza. She was on a voyage from Aalborg, Denmark to London. No further trace.
Gotha Elf	Russia	The steamship ran aground at Reval.
Jane and Mary	United Kingdom	The ship was driven against the quayside and severely damaged at Lossiemouth, Lothian. She was on a voyage from Banff, Aberdeenshire to Newcastle upon Tyne, Northumberland.
Kate Kearney	United Kingdom	The brig ran aground at Berwick upon Tweed, Northumberland. She was on a voyage from Callao, Peru to Berwick upon Tweed.
Swallow	United Kingdom	The brig was driven ashore near Dunkirk, Nord, France. She was on a voyage from Sunderland, County Durham to Dunkirk.
William Libby	United States	The ship ran aground in the Hooghly River 30 nautical miles (56 km) downstream of Calcutta, India. She was on a voyage from Calcutta to London. She was refloated on 23 November and taken back to Calcutta.

== 18 November ==
List of shipwrecks: 18 November 1857
Ship	State	Description
Doris	United Kingdom	The barque was abandoned in the Atlantic Ocean. All on board were rescued by Nazarene (United Kingdom). Doris was on a voyage from Flensburg, Duchy of Holstein to Santa Maria.
Eenstroom	Prussia	The full-rigged ship departed from Swinemünde for Colchester, Essex, United Kingdom. No further trace, presumed foundered with the loss of all hands.
Hamburg Packet	Norway	The schooner ran aground on the Herd Sand, in the North Sea off the coast of County Durham, United Kingdom. She was refloated the next day.
Henry Wooley	United Kingdom	The barque ran aground in the River Tay and was severely damaged. She was on a voyage from Kronstadt, Russia to Dundee, Forfarshire.
John Thompson	United Kingdom	The ship departed from Quebec City, Province of Canada, British North America for Poole, Dorset. No further trace, presumed foundered with the loss of all hands.
Madeira	United Kingdom	The ship departed from Santiago de Cuba, Cuba for Swansea, Glamorgan. No further trace, presumed foundered with the loss of all hands.
Ondine	United Kingdom	The steamship ran aground on the Margate Sand, off the coast of Kent. She was on a voyage from London to Dublin. She was refloated and resumed her voyage, but put in to Southampton, Hampshire on account of having lost a propeller blade.
William Foote	United Kingdom	The sailing barge collided with the steamship Triton and sank in the River Thames with the loss of four of the six people on board.

== 19 November ==
List of shipwrecks: 19 November 1857
Ship	State	Description
Anne	United Kingdom	The ship ran aground at "Bale", near Kilrush, County Clare. She had been refloated by 22 November and taken in to Kilrus.
Deux Maries	France	The ship ran aground off the Île de Batz, Finistère. She was on a voyage from Havre de Grâce, Seine-Inféreure to Cardiff, Glamorgan, United Kingdom. She was refloated and taken in to Roscoff, Finistère in a leaky condition.
Good Intent	United Kingdom	The brig ran aground in the River Thames at Millwall, Essex. She was refloated with the assistance of the tugboat Briton (United Kingdom).
Jane	United Kingdom	The crewless sloop drifted out to sea from Plymouth, Devon.
Mary	United Kingdom	The ship was wrecked at the mouth of the River Dee with the loss of all three crew. She was on a voyage from a port in Cumberland to Belfast, County Antrim.
Ocean	United Kingdom	The ship was driven ashore at Newburgh, Fife. She was on a voyage from Sunderland, County Durham to Newburgh. She was refloated.
Ondine	United Kingdom	The steamship ran aground on the Margate Sands, Kent. She was on a voyage from London to Dublin. She was refloated and resumed her voyage, but consequently put in to Southampton, Hampshire in a leaky condition.
Sir Charles Napier	United Kingdom	The ship ran aground and was wrecked on the Kish Bank, in the Irish Sea. Her eighteen crew were rescued. She was on a voyage from Liverpool, Lancashire to Sierra Leone.

== 20 November ==
List of shipwrecks: 20 November 1857
Ship	State	Description
Ann Mills	United Kingdom	The ship ran aground at Berwick upon Tweed, Northumberland. She was on a voyage from Saint John's, Newfoundland, British North America to Berwick upon Tweed.
Cresswell	United Kingdom	The schooner was driven ashore at Redcar, Yorkshire. She was on a voyage from Stockton-on-Tees, County Durham to Whitby, Yorkshire. She was refloated and taken in to Hartlepool, County Durham.
George	Kingdom of Hanover	The brig sprang a leak and was beached at Lisbon, Portugal. She was on a voyage from Newcastle upon Tyne, Northumberland to Naples, Kingdom of the Two Sicilies.
Halifax	United Kingdom	The ship ran aground on the Falsterbo Reef, in the Baltic Sea. She was on a voyage from Stockholm, Sweden to an English port. She was refloated and taken in to Helsingør, Denmark in a leaky condition.
Hampshire	United Kingdom	The barque was driven ashore at Malamocco, Kingdom of Lombardy–Venetia. She was on a voyage from Sunderland, County Durham to Venice, Kingdom of Lombardy–Venetia. She was refloated on 22 November with assistance from SMS Alnock ( Lombardy–Venetian Navy)
Lady Vaughan	United Kingdom	The ship was driven ashore at Great Yarmouth, Norfolk. She was on a voyage from Great Yarmouth to Newcastle upon Tyne. She was refloated.
Thyatira	United Kingdom	The brig was abandoned in the Atlantic Ocean. Her crew were rescued by the schooner Anderina (United Kingdom)> Thyatira was on a voyage from Quebec City, Province of Canada to Sunderland.

== 21 November ==
List of shipwrecks: 21 November 1857
Ship	State	Description
Cader Box	(United Kingdom of Great Britain and Ireland) Ceylon	The ship was wrecked at "Basbergn".
Enoch	United Kingdom	The ship ran aground at New Orleans, Louisiana, United States. She was on a voyage from New Orleans to Liverpool, Lancashire.
Futtet Hussel Louisa	(United Kingdom of Great Britain and Ireland) Ceylon	The ship was driven ashore and wrecked at Colombo.
Highlander	United Kingdom	The brig sprang a leak and sank off the Dudgeon Sandbank, in the North Sea. Her crew survived.
Hyoroos Pale Lechtung	(United Kingdom of Great Britain and Ireland) Ceylon	The ship was wrecked at "Basbergn", She was on a voyage from Galle to Colombo.
Mercy	(United Kingdom of Great Britain and Ireland) Ceylon	The ship was wrecked at "Basbergn".
Mohedin Pale	(United Kingdom of Great Britain and Ireland) Ceylon	The ship was wrecked at "Basbergn".
Nostra Senhora de la Boa	Portugal	The brig struck the Fregneira Rock, off Porto, and sank. She was on a voyage from Pernambuco, Brazil to Porto.
Sibella	United Kingdom	The ship was driven ashore and wrecked at Colombo with the loss of four lives.
Wesley	United Kingdom	The steamship ran aground in the Oder. She was on a voyage from Hull, Yorkshire to Swinemünde, Prussia and Stettin. She was refloated on 28 November.

== 22 November ==
List of shipwrecks: 22 November 1857
Ship	State	Description
Brandenburg	Rostock	The brig was driven ashore at Rethwisch, near Rostock. She was on a voyage from Cardiff, Glamorgan, United Kingdom to Lübeck. She was refloated the next day and taken in to Warnemünde.
Duke of Portland	United Kingdom	The ship was destroyed by fire. Her crew were rescued by Fort William (United Kingdom). Duke of Portland was on a voyage from Ardrossan, Ayrshire to Singapore, Straits Settlements.
European	United Kingdom	The ship was driven ashore at Harlech, Caernarfonshire. Her crew survived. She was refloated the next day.
Pryde	United Kingdom	The ship ran aground and was damaged on the Crusader Bank, in the Irish Sea off the coast of Lancashire. Her crew were rescued. She was on a voyage from Londonderry to Liverpool, Lancashire. She was later refloated and taken in to Lytham St. Anne's, Lancashire.

== 23 November ==
List of shipwrecks: 23 November 1857
Ship	State	Description
Alice	United Kingdom	The ship was wrecked on the Longsand, in the North Sea off the coast of Essex. Her crew were rescued. She was on a voyage from Porthcawl, Glamorgan to London.
Anne	United Kingdom	The fishing boat sank off Cockenzie, Lothian with the loss of four of her five crew.
Brighton	United Kingdom	The schooner ran aground and was severely damaged at Montrose, Forfarshire. She was on a voyage from Montrose to Middlesbrough, Yorkshire.
Darling	United Kingdom	The ship was wrecked "on the Longman". She was on a voyage from Hartlepool, County Durham to Inverness.
Heidelberg	United Kingdom	The ship ran aground on the Burbo Bank, in Liverpool Bay. She was on a voyage from New Orleans, Louisiana, United States to Liverpool, Lancashire. She was refloated with assistance from the tug Iron King and towed in to Liverpool in a leaky condition.
Isabella	United Kingdom	The dredge boat sank at Cockenzie with the loss of three of her five crew.
Janet and Ann	United Kingdom	The fishing boat was wrecked at Whitehills, Aberdeenshire with loss of life.
Lone Star	United States	The full-rigged ship foundered 150 nautical miles (280 km) off Faial Island, Azores. Her crew were rescued by Lady Louisa (United Kingdom). Lone Star was on a voyage from Moulmein, Burma to Queenstown, County Cork, United Kingdom.
Pink	United Kingdom	The barque foundered in the Firth of Forth with the loss of all nine crew.
Tenpence	United Kingdom	The ship was lost off Portsoy, Aberdeenshire with the loss of all nine crew.
Vigilant	United Kingdom	The fishing boat capsized off Portknockie, Moray with the loss of all nine of her crew.

== 24 November ==
List of shipwrecks: 24 November 1857
Ship	State	Description
Actif	France	The schooner was driven ashore and damaged at Flamborough Head, Yorkshire, United Kingdom. She was on a voyage from Dunkirk, Nord to Sunderland, County Durham, United Kingdom. She was refloated on 29 November and taken in to Bridlington, Yorkshire in a severely damaged condition.
Durham	United Kingdom	The steamship was wrecked on the Wolf Rock, off Audierne, Finistère, France. Her 21 crew were rescued. She was on a voyage from the Cape Coast Castle, Gold Coast to Tenerife, Canary Islands and London.
Elizabeth	United Kingdom	The ship was lost in the Baltic Sea. Her crew were rescued. She was on a voyage from Riga, Russia to an Irish port.
Figlia Jenny	Flag unknown	The barque was driven ashore and wrecked at West Hartlepool, County Durham, United Kingdom. She was refloated on 26 November and taken in to West Hartlepool.
Janet and Ann	United Kingdom	The ship was wrecked 3 nautical miles (5.6 km) west of Banff, Aberdeenshire with the loss of all hands.
Kelso	United Kingdom	The ship ran aground in the Min River and was damaged. She was on a voyage from Foo Chow Foo, China to London. She was refloated and put in to Hong Kong China for repairs.
Kingston	United Kingdom	The brig was wrecked at Redcar, Yorkshire.
New Orleans	United States	The ship departed from Belize City, British Honduras for Queenstown, County Cork, United Kingdom. No further trace, presumed foundered with the loss of all hands.
Occident	Russia	The steamship was wrecked on Seskar. She was on a voyage from Saint Petersburg to Kiel, Prussia.
Vorwaerts	Prussia	The barque ran aground at West Hartlepool. She was on a voyage from Gibraltar to West Hartlepool. She was refloated on 26 November and taken in to West Hartlepool.

== 25 November ==
List of shipwrecks: 25 November 1857
Ship	State	Description
Energy	United Kingdom	The brig ran aground off Great Yarmouth, Norfolk. She was on a voyage from South Shields, County Durham to London. She was refloated with the assistance of a tug and taken in to Lowestoft, Suffolk in a leaky condition.
Grampian	United Kingdom	The ship ran aground off the South Lighthouse, County Antrim. She was on a voyage from the Clyde to Bombay, India. She was refloated and resumed her voyage.
Hazard	France	The brig was abandoned. Her crew were rescued by Stjorna (Norway). Hazard was on a voyage from a French port to Gothenburg, Sweden.
John Paxton	United Kingdom	The brig ran aground on the Herd Sand, in the North Sea off the coast of County Durham. She was refloated with the assistance of a tug.
Kingston	United Kingdom	The ship was driven ashore and wrecked on "Bjonks Island", Sweden. Her crew survived.
Lady Kennaway	United Kingdom	The ship was wrecked at East London, Cape Colony. All on board survived. She was on a voyage from London, England to East London and Calcutta, India.

== 26 November ==
List of shipwrecks: 26 November 1857
Ship	State	Description
Arba	United Kingdom	The schooner ran aground on the Herd Sand, in the North Sea off the coast of County Durham. She was refloated.
Caminha and the Broadstairs Lifeboat	Portugal; United Kingdom	The brig Caminha was wrecked on the Goodwin Sands, Kent, United Kingdom. Her crew were rescued by the Broadstairs Lifeboat and the Ramsgate Lifeboat Northumberland (United Kingdom). Caminha was on a voyage from Newcastle upon Tyne, Northumberland, United Kingdom to Rio de Janeiro, Brazil. The Broadstairs Lifeboat was severely damaged during the rescue and consequently sank. Her crew were rescued by Northumberland.
Folle	France	The schooner ran aground on the Sunk Sand, in the North Sea off the coast of Essex, United Kingdom. She was on a voyage from Seaham, County Durham to Saint-Malo, Ille-et-Vilaine. She was refloated with the assistance of two smacks and assisted in to Harwich, Essex.
Helen Cook	United Kingdom	The ship capsized at Cromarty.
Jean Clothilde	France	The lugger was run ashore and wrecked at "Rathcarnon", Cornwall, United Kingdom. She was on a voyage from Cardiff, Glamorgan, United Kingdom to Bordeaux, Gironde.
Martello	United Kingdom	The steamship struck the Carr Rock, in the North Sea off the coast of Lothian and sank. All on board were rescued.
National	United States	The full-rigged ship was wrecked on the Colorados, off the coast of Cuba. All on board were rescued. She was on a voyage from New Orleans, Louisiana to Havre de Grâce, Seine-Inférieure, France.
Navvy	United Kingdom	The brig ran aground on the Knicht Sand, in the North Sea. She was on a voyage from Sunderland, County Durham to Hamburg.

== 27 November ==
List of shipwrecks: 27 November 1857
Ship	State	Description
Alida	Netherlands	The ship was abandoned off Terschelling, Friesland. Her crew were rescued by Anna Henriette (Netherlands). Alida was on a voyage from Hartlepool, County Durham, United Kingdom to Amsterdam, North Holland. She subsequently came ashore on Eierland, North Holland.
Alpha	United Kingdom	The sloop was driven ashore and wrecked at Scratby, Norfolk. Her crew were rescued. She was on a voyage from Newcastle upon Tyne, Northumberland to Colchester, Essex.
Auchincruive	United Kingdom	The ship collided with the schooner Mary Jane (United Kingdom) off The Lizard, Cornwall and was abandoned. She was on a voyage from Southampton, Hampshire to Glasgow, Renfrewshire. Auchincruive was towed in to the Isles of Scilly the next day in a derelict condition.
Carl	Prussia	The ship was wrecked on Scharhörn. She was on a voyage from London, United Kingdom to Königsberg.
Emigrant	United Kingdom	The ship foundered in the Indian Ocean. Her crew were rescued by the steamship Ireland (United Kingdom). Emigrant was on a voyage from London to Madras, India.
Jeune Adèle	France	The ship was in collision with a British vessel and was driven ashore on Euboea, Greece. She was on a voyage from Cardiff, Glamorgan, United Kingdom to Galați, Ottoman Empire. Her crew were rescued by a Greek Navy steamship, which assisted with her refloating.
Prosper	France	The ship struck the Leman Sand, in the North Sea and sank. She was on a voyage from Sunderland, County Durham to Bayonne, Basses-Pyrénées.
Synosure	United Kingdom	The ship struck the Sorelli Rocks. She was on a voyage from Zante, Greece to London. She was refloated and resumed her voyage but becoming increasingly leaky, was beached at Salcombe, Devon on 17 December.

== 28 November ==
List of shipwrecks: 28 November 1857
Ship	State	Description
Allandale	United Kingdom	The ship ran aground on the Maplin Sand, in the North Sea off the coast of Essex and sank. She was later refloated and taken in to Gravesend, Kent, where she arrived on 12 December.
Antoinette	United States	The full-rigged ship foundered in the Pacific Ocean. She was on a voyage from Callao, Peru to Queenstown, County Cork, United Kingdom.
Countess of Durham	United Kingdom	The ship was abandoned in the Atlantic Ocean (30°11′N 20°22′W). Her crew were rescued by the galiot Streentze (Netherlands). Countess of Durham was on a voyage from Cardiff, Glamorgan to Fernando Po, Equatorial Guinea.
Lydia	United Kingdom	The ship was driven ashore near the entrance to Belfast Lough. She was on a voyage from Ardrossan, Ayrshire to Havre de Grâce, Seine-Inférieure, France.
Une Kirstine	Denmark	The galiot was driven ashore on Læsø. She was refloated and taken in to Fredrikshavn.

== 29 November ==
List of shipwrecks: 29 November 1857
Ship	State	Description
Abraham	United Kingdom	The barque was wrecked at Sines, Portugal with the loss of four of her twelve crew.
Anna	United Kingdom	The sloop was wrecked on the Triangle Rock. Her crew were rescued. She was on a voyage from Saint Thomas, Barbados to Antigua.
Annamooka	(Russian Empire) Grand Duchy of Finland	The full-rigged ship ran aground on the Longsand, in the North Sea off the coast of Essex, United Kingdom. She was on a voyage from Pori to Gibraltar. She was refloated and taken in to Sheerness, Kent, United Kingdom in a waterlogged condition.
Dorchester	United Kingdom	The ship foundered in the Atlantic Ocean 66 nautical miles (122 km) west south west of Madeira. Her crew were rescued by Queen of the East (United Kingdom). Dorchester was on a voyage from Liverpool, Lancashire to Bombay, India.

== 30 November ==
List of shipwrecks: 30 November 1857
Ship	State	Description
Antonie	Hamburg	The ship ran aground at Sunderland, County Durham, United Kingdom. She was on a voyage from Hamburg to Sunderland.
Aristide	France	The sloop was run into by the steamship Normandie (France) and sank near Quillebeuf-sur-Seine, Eure. Her crew were rescued.
Blackett	United Kingdom	The ship ran aground on the Knowles, in the North Sea off the coast of Lincolnshire. She was refloated and taken in to the Humber, where she was beached, being severely leaky.
Carmelita	Spain	The ship was wrecked between Palamós and Sant Feliu de Guíxols. Her crew survived.
Dos Amigos	Spain	The ship was wrecked between Palamós and Sant Feliu de Guíxols. Her crew survived.
Henri	France	The ship was wrecked between Palamós and Sant Feliu de Guíxols with the loss of three lives.
Hilda	United Kingdom	The ship was wrecked near Ventava, Courland Governorate.
Janet	United Kingdom	The ship ran aground at Poole, Dorset.
Lucie	France	The ship was wrecked between Palamós and Sant Feliu de Guíxols. Her crew survived.
William Forrest	United Kingdom	The ship ran aground at Queenstown, County Cork. She was on a voyage from Taganrog, Russian Empire to Falmouth, Cornwall and Queenstown.

== Unknown date ==
List of shipwrecks: Unknown date in November 1857
Ship	State	Description
Allegheny	United States	The steamboat sank in the Mississippi River with some loss of life.
Andriette	Norway	The brig ran aground on the Cross Sand, in the North Sea off the coast of Norfolk, United Kingdom. She was on a voyage from Sundsvall to London, United Kingdom. Andriette was refloated and taken in to Lowestoft, Suffolk, United Kingdom on 7 November.
Ancram	Russia	The ship was driven ashore near Aspö, Grand Duchy of Finland. She was on a voyage from Kronstadt to Liverpool, Lancashire, United Kingdom. She had been refloated by 17 December.
Arabian	United Kingdom	The full-rigged ship was driven ashore at "St. Augustin's", Labrador, British North America. She was on a voyage from Miramichi, New Brunswick, British North America to a British port.
Argonaut	United Kingdom	The brig ran aground at Honfleur, Calvados. She was on a voyage from "Wyburg" to Honfleur. She was refloated on 6 November.
Askold	Imperial Russian Navy	The Bogatyr-class frigate ran aground in the Great Belt.
Astrea	Bremen	The ship was beached near Faro, Portugal before 4 November with the loss of a crew member. She was on a voyage from Galaţi, Ottoman Empire to Bremen.
Bayadère	France	The brig was wrecked on a rock between the Canary Islands and the Cape Verde Islands. Her crew were rescued. She was on a voyage from Port-Venfres, Basses-Pyrénées to Rio de Janeiro, Brazil.
Belmont	United Kingdom	The schooner sprang a leak and foundered off Cromer, Norfolk. Her crew were rescued by the schooner Ebenezer (United Kingdom). Belmont was on a voyage from Sunderland, County Durham to Middlesbrough, Yorkshire.
Bowling	United Kingdom	The barque was lost near the mouth of the Eider before 26 November. Her crew were rescued by the steamship Cumberland (United Kingdom). Bowling was on a voyage from Newcastle upon Tyne, Northumberland to Brake, Kingdom of Hanover.
Calcutta	United Kingdom	The barque was abandoned in the Atlantic Ocean before 10 November. She was on a voyage from Quebec City, Province of Canada, British North America to Dartmouth, Devon.
Commodore	United Kingdom	The ship ran aground on the Carr Rock, off the coast of Lothian.
Deux Marie	France	The ship schooner was run down and sunk in the English Channel off Dungeness, Kent, United Kingdom. Her crew were rescued.
Eagle	United Kingdom	The steamship was wrecked on the Fahludd Reef, in the Baltic Sea. She was on a voyage from Kronstadt, Russia to Hull, Yorkshire.
Elizabeth	United Kingdom	The barque sank in the River Tyne. She was raised on 6 November.
George	Danzig	The ship was wrecked near "Ruberg", Denmark. Her crew were rescued. She was on a voyage from Hartlepool, County Durham to Danzig.
Jane Ann	(United Kingdom of Great Britain and Ireland) British North America	The schooner was driven ashore and wrecked at "Little Metucna", Labrador. Her crew were rescued.
Mackintosh	United Kingdom	The ship foundered off Aberdeen before 7 November. She was on a voyage from Newcastle upon Tyne, Northumberland to Aberdeen.
Magnus Gabriel de la Gardie	Sweden	The steamship was wrecked near Marstrand with the loss of all but one of her crew. She was on a voyage from Gothenburg to London.
Manhow	Portugal	The full-rigged ship was lost off the coast of Formosa.
Mary C. Porter	United States	The ship was abandoned in the Atlantic Ocean off the coast of North Carolina. She was on a voyage from Santa Cruz, Cuba to Antwerp, Belgium. Mary C. Porter was taken in to Charleston, South Carolina on 3 December.
Mercury	United Kingdom	The brig ran aground on the Barber Sand, in the North Sea off the coast of Norfolk. Her crew were rescued. She was on a voyage from Sunderland to London. She had become a wreck by 12 November.
Nyverheid	Netherlands	The ship foundered in the North Sea between 19 and 25 November. She was on a voyage from Newcastle upon Tyne to Cádiz, Spain.
Ophelia	United Kingdom	The ship was driven ashore at Macduff, Aberdeenshire. Her crew survived. She was on a voyage from Leith, Lothian to Newcastle upon Tyne.
Otaheite	Bremen	The ship was wrecked on Buffalo Island, Burma before 3 November. Her crew survived. She was on a voyage from Calcutta, India to Singapore, Straits Settlements and Hong Kong, China.
Oxford	United States	The full-rigged ship was abandoned in the Atlantic Ocean. Her crew were rescued on 22 November by Mary and Martha (United States). Oxford was on a voyage from Livorno, Grand Duchy of Tuscany to Boston, Massachusetts.
Predeletta	Ottoman Empire	The ship was lost at Sulina with the loss of at least six of her fifteen crew. There were three confirmed survivors. She was on a voyage from Sulina to an English port.
Salvo A	Austrian Empire	The brig was abandoned in the Atlantic Ocean before 19 November. She was on a voyage from Taganrog, Russia to Falmouth, Cornwall, United Kingdom.
Sipen	Russia	The steamship collided with the steamship Constantin (Russia) and sank with the loss of eleven of the 60 people on board. She was on a voyage from Saint Petersburg and Schlisselburg or vice versa.
