= Union (1802 ship) =

History
- Name: Union
- Owner: Fanning & Coles
- Acquired: 1802 by purchase
- Fate: Wrecked at Koro Island, Fiji, about early December, 1804

General characteristics
- Tons burthen: 99 (bm)
- Draft: 12 ft
- Depth of hold: 14 ft
- Propulsion: Sail
- Sail plan: Brig
- Complement: 24 sailors, 12 sealers
- Armament: 2 × p-pounder guns + 2 swivel guns

Union was constructed at Barnstable, Massachusetts, later purchased by Edmund Fanning, who refitted and registered the vessel in New York under ownership of Fanning & Coles shipping company partnership.

Edmund Fanning was a seal skin and merchant trader who'd read the expedition journal of English navigator George Vancouver. Vancouver's journal was of particular interest to Fanning as Vancouver in 1791 had landed on the coast of New Holland at a place named King George the Third's Sound. Vancouver wrote about that region being rich with fur seals. On the strength of that information, Fanning made preparations to send Union there on a seal hunting expedition to gather 20,000 skins. His plan was to sell the skins in Canton for wares to bring back to New York.

Fanning commissioned 24-year-old Isaac Pendleton as captain of the expedition and selected 22-year-old Daniel Wright as chief officer. In addition, 18-year-old Isaiah Townsend was taken on Union as second mate. Union departed New York late September, 1802, for a brief stop in Stonington, Connecticut, before making the hop to Nantucket where she embarked a 12-man seal hunting gang led by Owen Folger-Smith. Union departed Nantucket 10 October 1802, with 36 men, then stopped by the island of Sal in the Portuguese out-post of Cape Verde before continuing to South Georgia to commence seal hunting. But the sealers didn't enjoy much luck while at South Georgia, only obtaining from there around 300 or 400 skins.

At King George's Sound (near present-day Albany, Western Australia) Pendleton met Nicolas Baudin who was captain of Le Géographe. Baudin shared with him charts of Île Borda (Kangaroo Island) and advised him of bountiful seals there. Acting on this advice Pendleton proceeded to Kangaroo Island, and in April 1803 decided to spend the winter there, at an inlet now known as American River, and to build a small sealer, the schooner Independence.

Union arrived at Sydney on 6 October 1803 from the "Straits" with a cargo of skins. She left for China on 29 August 1804.

While sailing from Sydney to China, Union called at Tongatapu in the Friendly Islands searching for sandalwood. Isaac Pendleton and seven other men went ashore on 1 October 1804. Unbeknownst to the crew remaining aboard Union, the natives had killed all eight men. The following day, a canoe approached the ship with a white woman on board. It appeared that her role was to entice another boat load of men to come ashore but she cried out that the other men had been murdered and she leapt out of the canoe and swam to the ship. The crew rescued her and held off the natives whilst the ship raised anchor. The woman turned out to be Elizabeth Mosley (or Mosey, or Morey), the sole survivor from Duke of Portland, which had called at the island some two years earlier and whose crew the natives too had killed.

Union's surviving crew, under First Mate Daniel Wright, sailed her back to Sydney, arriving on 25 October 1804. Union sailed for Fiji on 12 November 1804, under contract to Simeon Lord.

== Fate ==
Union was totally wrecked on the island of Koro. The master, Daniel Wright, and the other twenty-one crew drowned or were killed by natives. No exact record of the date of its wrecking was recorded.

== Narratives ==
Walter Bates wrote one account of a voyage aboard Union. Another account was written by Edmund Fanning in "Voyages around the World".
