= Pendelton =

Pendelton is the surname of the following people

- Andrew Pendelton III, stage name of the American professional wrestler Andrew Robert Horsefield (born 1982)
- Thomas Pendelton (born 1971), American tattoo artist and television personality

== See also ==
- Pendleton (name)
