= Defer =

Defer may refer to:

- Defer Elementary School, a Michigan State Historic Site
- Deference, the acknowledgement of the legitimacy of the power of one's superior or superiors
- Deferral, the delaying of the realization of an asset or liability until a future date
- Defer in programming, a deference mechanism to postpone cleanup calls until the end of a function call

== See also ==
- DeFer
- Differ (disambiguation)
