= Arcobacter butzleri =

Scientific classification
- Domain: Bacteria
- Kingdom: Pseudomonadati
- Phylum: Campylobacterota
- Class: "Campylobacteria"
- Order: Campylobacterales
- Family: Arcobacteraceae
- Genus: Arcobacter
- Species: A. butzleri

Binomial name
- Arcobacter butzleri (Kiehlbauch et al. 1991) Vandamme et al. 1992

Species of bacterium

Arcobacter butzleri is a gram-negative, motile, spiral shaped, and aerotolerant pathogen. It is commonly found in animals, water sources, food products, and gastrointestinal illnesses in humans. A. butzleri was initially classified under the Campylobacterota genus, but was later reclassified to Arcobacter due to DNA-DNA hybridization, Average Nucleotide Identity (ANI), and other molecular techniques.

== Taxonomy ==
Arcobacter butzleri is a species that falls under the bacteria domain and is classified under the Campylobacterota phylum, which consists of Gram-negative, S-shaped rods. Over the past couple of decades, there have been multiple changes in the taxonomic classification of A. butzleri. A. butzleri is classified under the class Campylobacteria, order Campylobacterales, family Acrobacteraceae, and genus Arcobacter. Before its Campylobacteria class designation, A. butzleri was initially considered under the Epsilonproteobacteria class. However, in 2017, Waite et al., reclassified the Epsilonproteobacteria class into the new phylum Epsilonproteobacteria. Additionally, the Arcobacter genus was initially classified as the Campylobacteria genus, but was recognized as its own genus due to its differentiated ability to grow in aerobic conditions between 15 and 30 ℃. The reclassification removed A. butzleri from the Epsilonproteobacteria classification and included it in the newly designated Arcobacteraceae family under the class Campylobacteria. In 2018, a study conducted by Perez Cataluña et al. proposed that the Arcobacter genus be divided into six genera because of varying differences in their phenotypes. The six genera include Aliiarcobacter, the classification that A. butzleri would be classified under, in addition to Pseudoarcobacter, Haloarcobacter, Poseidonbacter, and Arcomarinus genus. However, other studies rebut the proposal based on additional phenotypic analysis that only supported Arcobacter's separation from the Epsilonproteobacteria but not the further distinction of the Arcobacter genus. Despite its uncertain classification, A butzleri is a part of a very diverse genus.

== Phylogeny ==
Phylogenetic analysis reveals over 30 diverse recognized species in the Arcobacter genus. The nearest neighbor to A. butzleri is A. lacus. The two species sharing the same ancestor are indicated as their own distinct subcluster, Cluster 1B, on the phylogeny tree. A variety of molecular methods can be used to describe the relatedness between different Arcobacter species. The 16s rRNA gene sequence illustrates high sequence similarity of over 99% in closely related species such as A. butzleri and A. lacus. Other techniques such as Genome-wide Average Nucleotide Identity (ANI) and DNA-DNA hybridization (DDH) provide more information about species separation. The high ANI value of 94.2% additionally reveals that A. butzleri and A. lacus are very closely related; however, their low DDH value of 55.7% confirms that they are separate species.

== Discovery and isolation ==
The first instance and discovery of the genus Arcobacter was in 1977 when scientists isolated the microorganism from pig and bovine fetuses in Belfast, U.K. The discovery of this genus was made by scientists named W. Ellis, S. Neill, J. O’Brien, H. Ferguson, and J. Hann.

A study in 1992 performed isolations of many different Arcobacter strains, where they eventually named a strain called A. butzleri. The scientists performed a two-stage isolation: the first stage isolated samples in microaerobic conditions, and the second stage selected for the isolates, labeled as aerotolerant bacteria, that were capable of growing in microaerobic conditions. The aerotolerant bacteria allowed for the distinction from Campylobacter to Arcobacter, as it is aerotolerant and not oxygen-sensitive. The study isolated 83 strains of Arcobacter from animal samples. From the samples, the strains were filtered out to reduce unwanted bacteria. The filtered fluids were then placed on different types of nutrient agar plates and stored in microaerobic environments. After three to four days of incubation in a low-oxygen environment, Arcobacter colonies were characterized as grey, flat, and watery. However, if bacteria resembling Campylobacter were observed, they were transferred onto another nutrient agar plate. Once isolated, all the strains would be grown under microaerobic conditions on various types of media for further study. The bacteriological purity would be further verified by plating and analyzing living and gram-stained cells. The completed isolation method led to using a polyphasic approach, which refers to a comprehensive method of classifying a specific microorganism. Using the polyphasic approach, they utilized various methods to analyze the proteins of the organism to study their genetic makeup and check how their genetic material matched with known species. These methods led to the results of the study revealing the naming of A. bultzeri and its characterization of the microorganisms.

== Physiology and metabolic characteristics ==
Arcobacter butzleri measures around 0.2 to 0.4 μm in width and 1 to 3.0 μm in length. A. butzleri is a heterotrophic bacteria that obtains its energy from a carbon source inside its host cells to undergo aerobic respiration. The bacteria is able to grow on substrates such as fumarate, lactate, malate, and pyruvate due to certain genes such as the ab1480-ab1482 genes and the ab1083 gene that encode for the necessary enzymes to process these compounds - pyruvate dehydrogenase and malic enzyme, respectively. With the enzymes, the bacteria possess the ability to generate the intermediates used in the citric acid cycle for energy production. A. butzleri is a very adaptive organism that also possesses a set of genes that encodes for numerous electron donors crucial for the electron transport chain that allow it to survive in different oxygen conditions, from oxygen-rich environments to environments with little or no oxygen.

To survive in environments like sewers with harmful high nitrite concentrations, A. butzleri has multiple mechanisms to prevent nitrite toxicity. Nitrite accumulates from production by nitrate reductase in A. butzleri, however, the nrFAH gene encodes for the enzyme cytochrome C nitrite reductase (nrfAH) to prevent the toxic buildup of nitrite by converting it to harmless ammonia. Additionally, A. butzleri has the unique gene, norB, that is not present in other Arcobacter species such as A. anerophilus. The norB gene encodes for nitric oxide reductase, which plays an important role in managing reactive nitrogen intermediates that may form during nitrite metabolism. Although A. butzleri is able to undergo nitrite detoxification, it lacks the genes that allow it to undergo nitrogen fixation - the ability convert atmospheric nitrogen to usable forms - that its relatives, A nitrofigilis and A. anaerophilus possess.

== Involvement in applied science ==
Arcobacter butzleri emerged as a food-borne pathogen that affects animals and humans. The prevalence of this bacterium is fairly common as A. butzleri is found to be the third most common species in feces in South Africa and fourth in Belgium and France. This led scientists to start researching preventive actions toward A. butzleri, as studies report that its antibiotic resistance is increasing throughout the world. One study focused on a transcriptome analysis of A. butzleri infection and explored its virulence genes in vitro. The study states that characterization of these genes can help recognize virulence genes and further understand the mechanism of infection by A. butzleri. Regarding its effects on animals, Arcobacter affects the population rate by causing illnesses like abortions and diarrhea. This is a real problem that can decrease the birthrate of animals, as A. butzleri continues to affect many animals and cause harm. For humans, infection may occur due to contamination in food and water, leading to watery diarrhea. The prevalence of this bacterium is fairly common as A. butzleri is found to be the third most common species in feces in South Africa and fourth in Belgium and France.

== Ecology ==
Arcobacter butzleri is an organism that is primarily linked to aquatic environments such as rivers, groundwater, oceans, sewage, and even drinking water. The presence of the organism in aquatic environments is typically due to contamination from livestock feces, as the organism is more abundantly found in contaminated water compared to other water sources. Due to its occasional presence in treated drinking water, there is often a high probability of transmitting A. butzleri through water and food products to humans and other animals. The bacteria’s ability to thrive in both aerobic and anaerobic organismic conditions explains how it survives in aquatic environments and inside human and animal intestines. In addition to being able to grow in environments of different oxygen levels, A. butzleri is adaptable and can grow in a wide range of temperatures, from 15°C up to 42°C.

== Genomics ==
One strain of the genus Arcobacter genome was sequenced completely and found to have 2.34 Megabases. The strain was A. butzleri which had 2,259 coding sequences. In the coding sequences, it was determined that 1,011 of them have a designated function, 505 have regular function, and the remaining 743 coding sequences were classified with unknown functions. Additionally, a large part of the genome for A. butzleri codes for the organism’s growth and survival under various environmental conditions. Other parts of the genome include functions for signal transduction, DNA repair, adaptation, and proteins that are associated with respiration.

== Importance ==
The organism A. butzleri is commonly found in contaminated water where it can transmit harmful infection to humans and animals. This leads to infection in the potential food supply as it has a high occurrence with poultry. A. butzleri can be found in the stool due to its prevalence in diarrheal stool. Additionally, this infection from the organism continues to increase its prevalence around the world as it was seen in Thai children, Taiwan, Hong Kong, South Africa, and some European countries. This calls for research on how to prevent this infection of A. butzleri, and how people can inhibit the growth of this microorganism. Another study focuses on the virulence genes and potential pathogenicity of its mechanism. Through the rising prevalence of infection in various countries and characterization of the viral factor, A. butzleri should be considered as a microorganism to be studied and researched.
