= Independence (schooner) =

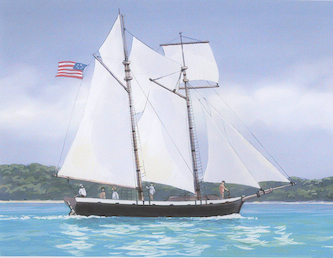
- Artist's impression of Independence

History

United States
- Name: Independence
- Launched: 1803
- Fate: Missing, believed wrecked in 1805

General characteristics
- Class & type: Schooner
- Tons burthen: 35 tons
- Length: 45 ft (14 m)

Independence , a 35-ton schooner, was the first ship constructed in South Australian waters. The crew of the visiting American sealing brig Union, under the command of Capt. Isaac Pendleton, built her between April and August 1803 at what is now known as American River on Kangaroo Island. Daniel Wright, the ship's carpenter, was in charge of the construction of the Independence at the mouth of Ship Creek, 800m west of the present-day American River oval.

On 15 June 1805, Independence set sail from Sydney for the Antipodes Islands (860 km south east of Dunedin New Zealand) and was never seen again. The Sydney Gazette reported the loss on 16 March 1806.

== Prehistory ==
In 1802, Capt. Isaac Pendleton of Stonington, Connecticut was commissioned by Fanning & Coles of New York to sail Union to the waters of New Holland in search of seal skins. "Her commander (Captain Isaac Pendleton) was …left unrestricted, and at perfect liberty to act on all occasions as his judgment should direct, to make the most profitable voyage he could of it for his owners." In early 1803, whilst sealing in King George Sound near what is now Albany, Western Australia Pendleton met the French explorer, Nicolas Baudin, who recommended Kangaroo Island as a place where seals could be found in plenitude.

Arriving in what is now known as Eastern Cove on the north coast of Kangaroo Island, Pendleton took the decision to winter here and, presumably to increase the quantity of skins that could be taken to Sydney, construct a smaller vessel to work alongside Union in its sealing activities.

== Construction and use ==
As was common practice at the time, Union carried the frame of a small schooner. This, possibly with the addition of some locally sourced timber, was used to build a smaller vessel. It appears that Baudin had lost a longboat whilst surveying the coastline of Kangaroo Island and his carpenters had found suitable timber to rebuild the longboat near what is now the town of American River. As the new vessel was to be smaller than Union, it would have better access to shallow waters. Thus was born Independence.

No original plans of Independence are known to exist. In fact, it is possible the original Independence was built without plans.

The two ships sealed together, working around southern Australia and then shipped their seal furs to buyers including some in China, "The ship Union, and schooner Independence are expected to sail this day for China." from The Sydney Gazette 1804. Union was lost at sea with all hands in 1804 off the coast of Fiji.

== Reconstruction ==
In May 2013, the Rebuild Independence Group, a volunteer group based in American River, was formed to set about reconstructing the Independence.
