= Hans Blokland =

Hans Blokland may refer to:

- Hans Blokland (politician) (born 1943), Dutch former Member of the European Parliament
- Hans T. Blokland (born 1960), Dutch social and political theorist
