= Differentiation of measures =

In mathematics, differentiation of measures may refer to:

- the problem of differentiation of integrals, also known as the differentiation problem for measures;
- the Radon–Nikodym derivative of one measure with respect to another.
- the theory of differentiable measures.
