= Arcobacter skirrowii =

Scientific classification
- Domain: Bacteria
- Kingdom: Pseudomonadati
- Phylum: Campylobacterota
- Class: "Campylobacteria"
- Order: Campylobacterales
- Family: Arcobacteraceae
- Genus: Arcobacter
- Species: A. skirrowii

Binomial name
- Arcobacter skirrowii Vandamme et al., 1992

Species of bacterium

Arcobacter skirrowii is a species of bacteria. It can be pathogenic.
