= Isaac Pendleton =

Captain Isaac Pendleton
- Born: 22 November 1777; Kings County, Rhode Island now Washington County
- Died: 1 October 1804 (aged 26); Tongatapu
- Occupations: Ship's master, sealer
- Known for: exploring southern ocean
- Spouse: Nancy Sheffield (m. 1802)
- Parent(s): Amos Pendleton and Anna Foster

Isaac Pendelton (22 November 1777 – 1 October 1804) was an American Ship's master and sealer.

Isaac Pendelton was born on 22 November 1777 in King's County, Rhode Island (the former name for Washington County) on 22 November 1777.

In 1802, he married Nancy Sheffield in Stonington, New London County, Connecticut. In October that year he was commissioned by Fanning & Coles as captain of the US brig Union and embarked on a sealing voyage to New Holland. In early 1803, Pendleton met French explorer, Nicolas Baudin in King George Sound. Baudin suggested Kangaroo Island as a place where seals could be found in abundance. On Kangaroo Island near modern-day American River, South Australia, Pendleton commissioned the construction of the schooner Independence, the first ship built in South Australian waters.

Pendelton was killed by Tongans on Tongatapu on 1 October 1804.
