= Pendleton (name) =

Pendleton is both a surname and a given name. Notable people with the name include:

Surname:

- Alan George Pendleton (1837–1916), South Australian Railways official
- Alexander Sandie Pendleton (1840–1864), Confederate staff officer serving Thomas 'Stonewall' Jackson
- Austin Pendleton, (born 1940), American film, television, and stage actor
- Brian Pendleton (1944–2001), guitarist with British group The Pretty Things in the 1960s
- Charles F. Pendleton (1931–1953), Medal of Honor recipient in US Army during the Korean War
- Chris Pendleton (born 1982), American amateur wrestler
- Don Pendleton (1927–1995), American author, creator of the Mack Bolan character
- Edmund Pendleton (1721–1803), American politician, lawyer, and judge, delegate to the Continental Congress from Virginia
- Edmund Henry Pendleton (1788–1862), U.S. Representative from New York
- Edmund J. Pendleton (1899–1987), American composer
- Ellen Fitz Pendleton (1864–1936), American college president
- Florence Pendleton (1926–2020), shadow senator from the District of Columbia
- Freddie Pendleton (born 1963), retired professional boxer
- George C. Pendleton (1845–1913), Democratic politician, Texas state representative and speaker, Texas lieutenant governor, and U.S. Representative
- George H. Pendleton (1825–1889), American politician, senator from Ohio, eponym of the Pendleton Civil Service Reform Act
- Henry Pendleton (c. 1521 – 1557), English churchman, theologian
- Isaac Pendleton (1777–1804), US sailor, captain of the brig Union
- Jack J. Pendleton (1918–1944), US Army soldier and WWII Medal of Honor recipient
- Jim Pendleton (1924–1996), American professional baseball player
- James M. Pendleton (1822–1889), U.S. Representative from Rhode Island
- James Madison Pendleton (1811–1891), 19th-century Baptist preacher, educator and theologian
- Joey Pendleton, Democratic member and minority whip of the Kentucky Senate
- John Pendleton (1802–1868), 19th-century Virginia congressman, diplomat, lawyer and farmer
- John Pendleton, Jr. (1749–1806), acting governor of Virginia in 1799
- John O. Pendleton (1851–1916), U.S. Representative from West Virginia
- Joseph Henry Pendleton (1860–1942), American Marine Corps general, eponym of Camp Pendleton
- Karen Pendleton (1946–2019), original Mickey Mouse Club Mouseketeer
- Lance Pendleton (born 1983), American professional baseball player
- Linwood Pendleton (born 1964), American environmental economist, acting chief economist of the National Oceanic and Atmospheric Administration (NOAA)
- Moses Pendleton (born 1949), choreographer, dancer and artistic director of dance company MOMIX
- Nat Pendleton (1895–1967), American Olympic wrestler and film actor
- Nathaniel Pendleton (1756–1821), US lawyer and judge during the American Revolutionary War and afterward
- Nathanael G. Pendleton (1793–1861), U.S. Representative from Ohio
- Olga Pendleton, American statistician
- Philip C. Pendleton (1779–1863), US federal judge in Virginia
- Robert Larimore Pendleton (1890–1957), American soil scientist
- Steve Pendleton (1908–1984), American film actor
- Terry Pendleton (born 1960), American professional baseball player 1984–1998
- Victoria Pendleton (born 1980), British track cyclist
- William Frederic Pendleton (1845–1927), first executive bishop of General Church of the New Jerusalem
- William N. Pendleton (1809–1883), American teacher, Episcopal priest, and Confederate general
- William W. Pendleton (born 1940), former Democratic member of the Pennsylvania House of Representatives

Given name:

- Pendleton Murrah (1824–1865), American politician, governor of Texas during the American Civil War
- Pendleton Ward (born 1982), American animator, musician, screenwriter, and producer
- Edmund Pendleton Gaines (1777–1849), United States Army Major General, namesake of Fort Gaines, Alabama

Fictional characters:

- Treavor Pendleton, a fictional character from the 2012 video game Dishonored by Arkane Studios
- Murphy Pendleton, a fictional character and protagonist of the 2012 video game Silent Hill: Downpour
- Forsythe Pendleton "Jughead" Jones III is one of the fictional characters created by Bob Montana and John L. Goldwater in Archie Comics
- Erina Pendleton, a fictional character from the anime Jojo’s Bizarre Adventure
