= Henry More Smith =

Henry More Smith (fl. 19th century.) (also known as Henry Frederick Moon, Henry J. Moon, Henry Hopkins, Henry Frederick More Smith and William Newman) was a Canadian conman, puppeteer, hypnotist, and escape artist who lived for a while in New Brunswick, Canada.

== Biography ==
Although he is believed to have been an Englishman born in Brighton, England, his origins are clouded by what he told people at the time. On one occasion he was asked where he had come from, he laughed and pointed outside to the full Moon.

He arrived in Windsor in 1812 as Frederic Henry More. After staying with a family in the village of Rawdon, Nova Scotia, he eloped with and married their daughter, a girl named Elizabeth P. Bond, on March 12, 1813, in Windsor. He fathered three children with her. Winkworth, Elenor, and Josiah. He worked as a pedlar-tailor. He took orders for coats and made them up by stealing a similar coat. He was caught after a victim recognized his coat on another man.

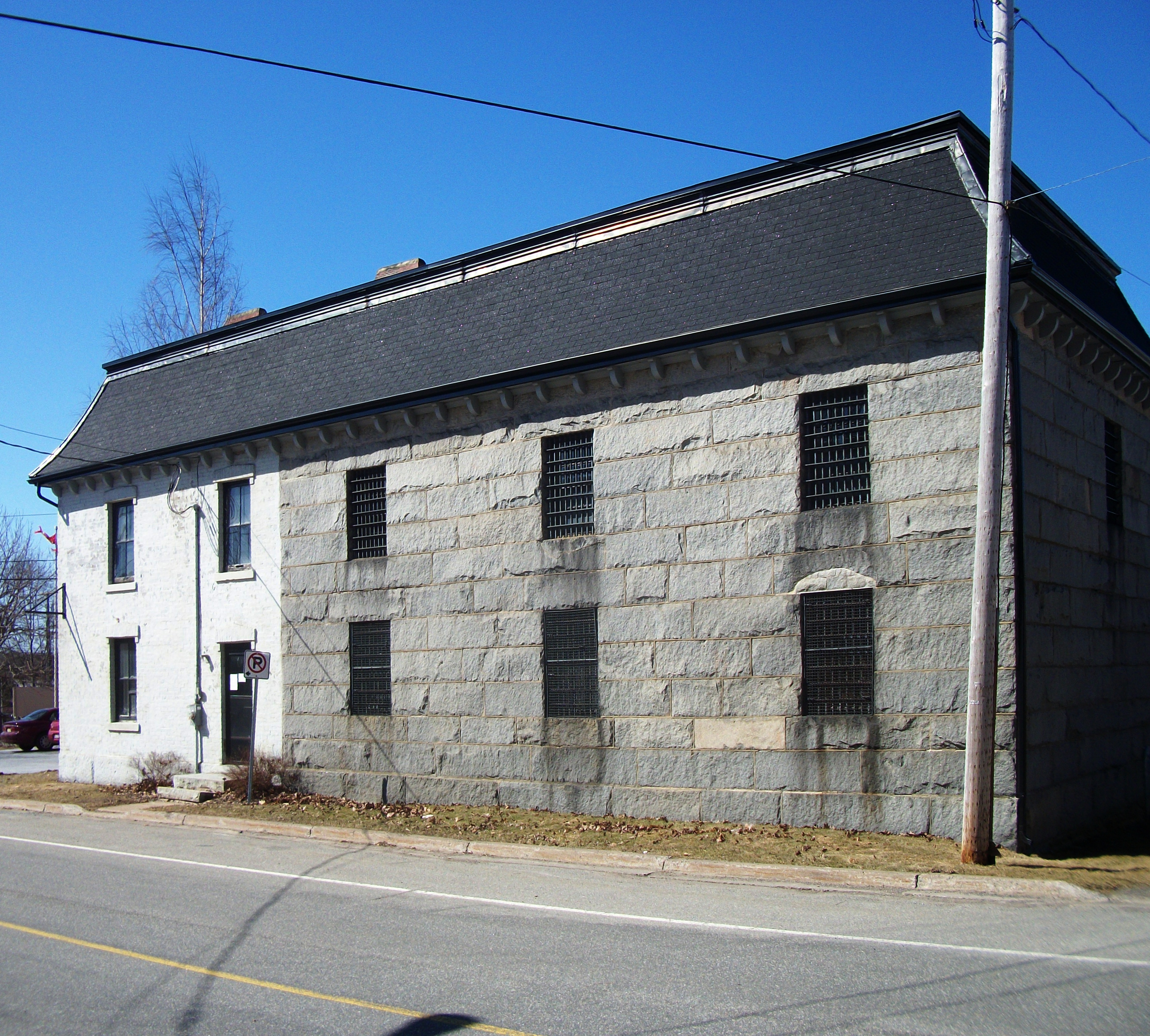
Hampton Gaol (formerly Kingston Gaol) where Smith was incarcerated and from which he escaped in 1814.

In July 1814 he arrived in Saint John, New Brunswick, this time as Henry More Smith. He was caught on July 24 and imprisoned in the Kings Co. Jail as a horse thief. Visitors to the jail can see the cell where he was kept. He faked an illness so well that housewives sent special foods to his bedside, one even sent him a feather bed to die on. While the jailer and a clergymen were heating a brick for his chilled back, Smith vanished into the night.

Allegedly, on more than one occasion when a posse was combing the countryside for him, searchers discovered afterwards that he had been a member of the posse the day before. Recaptured again and awaiting trial for horse stealing, Smith pretended to be insane. In his cell they found Smith had fashioned an elaborate marionette show out of his bed straw and shreds of his clothing. There were ten characters in all and Smith would whistle a tune while a puppet clanged a tambourine and all the characters danced to the tune.

Smith's act so deeply impressed the authorities that he received a pardon on condition he would leave New Brunswick and never return.

According to Walter Bates, his jailer and later biographer, the last sighting of Smith was in Newgate, Simsbury, Connecticut in 1816.

== Cultural references ==
The Lunar Rogue Pub, located in the city of Fredericton, New Brunswick has a supposed portrait of him on their signage.

In 2010, the life of Henry More Smith was dramatized by the Next Folding Theatre Company in a play titled "Henry Moon: Conducts and Mischiefs of the Lunar Rogue" This production will be staged again in early 2023 by Youth Theatre Station, with performances in Hampton, New Brunswick.

== References and further reading ==
- Bates, Walter (1979) [1817]. Henry More Smith: The mysterious stranger; being an authentic account of the numerous arrests, remarkable doings and wonderful escapes of the most noted road agent who ever pestered the authorities of New Brunswick (reprint ed.). New Brunswick: Non-Entity Press. ISBN 0-9690215-1-8..
- Grantmyre, Barbara Lucas (1963). Lunar Rogue. New Brunswick: Brunswick Press.
- Wells, John (1994). Princess Caraboo: Her True Story. Sydney: Pan Macmillan. pp. 251–257. ISBN 0-330-33630-4.
