= Arcobacter venerupis =

Scientific classification
- Domain: Bacteria
- Kingdom: Pseudomonadati
- Phylum: Campylobacterota
- Class: "Campylobacteria"
- Order: Campylobacterales
- Family: Arcobacteraceae
- Genus: Arcobacter
- Species: A. venerupis

Binomial name
- Arcobacter venerupis Levican et al. 2012

Species of bacterium

Arcobacter venerupis is a species of Gram-negative, slightly curved motile rod-shaped bacteria. It was first recovered from mussels and clams. Its type strain is F67-11(T) = CECT 7836(T) = LMG 26156(T).
