= Arcobacter anaerophilus =

Scientific classification
- Domain: Bacteria
- Kingdom: Pseudomonadati
- Phylum: Campylobacterota
- Class: "Campylobacteria"
- Order: Campylobacterales
- Family: Arcobacteraceae
- Genus: Arcobacter
- Species: A. anaerophilus

Binomial name
- Arcobacter anaerophilus (Sasi Jyothsna et al. 2013) Perez-Cataluna et al. 2018

Type strain
- DSM 24636, JC84, KCTC 15071, MTCC 10956

Synonyms
- Haloarcobacter anaerophilus

Species of bacterium

Arcobacter anaerophilus is a Gram-negative and non-motile bacterium from the genus Arcobacter which has been isolated from sediment from the Gangasagar in India.
