= You, by Us =

EP by Pendleton
- Released: 14 June 2006 (UK)
- Recorded: 2006
- Genre: Punk rock Skate punk
- Label: Distort Manchester Records
- Producer: Jason Gough

Pendleton chronology
| You, by Us (2006) | You, by Us: Extended Edition (2007) |

Professional ratings
Review scores
| Source | Rating |
|---|---|
| Punktastic | 4/5 stars |

You, by Us: Extended Edition

EP by Pendleton
- Released: July 4th, 2007 (USA/Japan)
- Label: Angry Penguin Records / Bells On Records

Pendleton chronology
| You, by Us (2006) | You, by Us: Extended Edition (2007) | The Difference (2008) |

You, by Us was the first release from UK skate punk band Pendleton. It was released on 14 June 2006 by Distort Manchester Records in the UK. A video was shot for the song "Falling Apart to Double Time" which received rotation on MTV2 in the UK.

The EP met with some critical acclaim, with punk music website Punktastic.com describing Pendleton as "the best skate punk band in the UK".

In 2007 the EP was licensed by Angry Penguin Records for release in the US and to Bells On Records for release in Japan. These releases were both extended editions of You, by Us, with four extra songs added which were taken from the band's earlier, self-recorded, release Stamp out the Japanazis.

== Track listing ==
- UK Edition
1. "A Bright Future for Pendleton" – 3:15
2. "Falling Apart to Double Time" – 3:15
3. "The Shirking Class" – 2:41
4. "Make it Better" – 3:18
- Extended Edition (USA and Japan)
1. "A Bright Future for Pendleton" – 3:15
2. "Falling Apart to Double Time" – 3:15
3. "The Shirking Class" – 2:41
4. "Make it Better" – 3:18
5. "Punk Rocks" – 2:13
6. "Amerika" – 2:28
7. "Last Rat in the Race" – 2:37
8. "S.L.A.G.S" – 2:10

Tracks included on the Extended Edition EP were previously self-released by the band under the title Stamp out the Japanazis.
