= Arcobacter bivalviorum =

Scientific classification
- Domain: Bacteria
- Kingdom: Pseudomonadati
- Phylum: Campylobacterota
- Class: "Campylobacteria"
- Order: Campylobacterales
- Family: Arcobacteraceae
- Genus: Arcobacter
- Species: A. bivalviorum

Binomial name
- Arcobacter bivalviorum Levican et al. 2012

Species of bacterium

Arcobacter bivalviorum is a species of Gram-negative, slightly curved, motile, rod-shaped bacteria first recovered from mussels and clams. Its type strain is F4(T)=CECT 7835(T)=LMG 26154(T).
