= Hans T. Blokland =

Dutch political scientist

Hans T. Blokland (born 1960) is a Dutch social and political theorist.He was a fellow of the Royal Netherlands Academy of the Arts and Sciences and held visiting positions at Yale University and the University of Manchester. Between 2009 and 2015 Blokland was International Professor at the Humboldt University of Berlin. In 2012 he was also appointed on the Corelio-Chair for Media and Democracy at the Free University Brussels. And in 2013 he was appointed on the Alfred Grosser chair in sociology of the SciencesPo in France.

Blokland is the author of, among other things, Freedom and Culture in Western Society (1997), Modernization and its political consequences (2006) and Pluralism, Democracy and Political Knowledge: Robert A. Dahl and his Critics on Modern Politics. His work has awarded, among others, the Pieter de la Court-prize of the Royal Netherlands Academy of Arts and Sciences.

The central subjects of Blokland's work are the meanings of freedom, autonomy, paternalism and emancipation; cultural politics and cultural policy; ethical pluralism of philosophers like Isaiah Berlin and political pluralism of political scientists like Robert Dahl and Charles E. Lindblom; the process of modernization (rationalization, differentiation and individualization); the dissemination, potencies and flaws of the market and bureaucracy; the development of (the thinking on) democracy, policy-making and planning; and the history and potency of political science.

In 2016, Blokland founded the social enterprise Social Science Works (SSW). Based in Potsdam, SSW specializes in deliberative democracy. It seeks to develop new forms of social and political participation and to strengthen the political competences of citizens. Spearheads are democracy, deliberation, citizenship, radicalization, extremism, migration and integration. SSW's clients include the Bundeszentrale für politische Bildung, the Bundesamt für Migration und Flüchtlinge and the European Union.

== Select bibliography ==
- Freedom and Culture in Western Society (London & New York: Routledge, 1997)
- Modernization and its Political Consequences: Weber, Mannheim and Schumpeter (New Haven & London: Yale University Press, 2006)
- Pluralism, Democracy and Political Knowledge: Robert A. Dahl and his Critics on Modern Politics (London & New York: Routledge, 2011 and 2016)
