= Arcobacter halophilus =

Scientific classification
- Domain: Bacteria
- Kingdom: Pseudomonadati
- Phylum: Campylobacterota
- Class: "Campylobacteria"
- Order: Campylobacterales
- Family: Arcobacteraceae
- Genus: Arcobacter
- Species: A. halophilus

Binomial name
- Arcobacter halophilus Donachie et al. 2005

Species of bacterium

Arcobacter halophilus is a species of obligate halophilic bacteria. It is Gram-negative, and its type strain is LA31B^{T}(=ATCC BAA-1022^{T} =CIP 108450^{T}).
