= Arcobacter ebronensis =

Scientific classification
- Domain: Bacteria
- Kingdom: Pseudomonadati
- Phylum: Campylobacterota
- Class: "Campylobacteria"
- Order: Campylobacterales
- Family: Arcobacteraceae
- Genus: Arcobacter
- Species: A. ebronensis

Binomial name
- Arcobacter ebronensis Levican et al. 2015

Species of bacterium

Arcobacter ebronensis is a species of bacteria first recovered from mussels, with type strain F128-2^{T} (=CECT 8441^{T} = LMG 27922^{T}).
