= Arcobacter cibarius =

Scientific classification
- Domain: Bacteria
- Kingdom: Pseudomonadati
- Phylum: Campylobacterota
- Class: "Campylobacteria"
- Order: Campylobacterales
- Family: Arcobacteraceae
- Genus: Arcobacter
- Species: A. cibarius

Binomial name
- Arcobacter cibarius Houf et al. 2005

Species of bacterium

Arcobacter cibarius is a species of Gram-negative, rod-shaped, slightly curved, non-spore-forming bacteria. LMG 21996^{T} (=CCUG 48482^{T}) is its type strain.
