= Arcobacter aquimarinus =

Scientific classification
- Domain: Bacteria
- Kingdom: Pseudomonadati
- Phylum: Campylobacterota
- Class: "Campylobacteria"
- Order: Campylobacterales
- Family: Arcobacteraceae
- Genus: Arcobacter
- Species: A. aquimarinus

Binomial name
- Arcobacter aquimarinus Levican et al. 2015

Species of bacterium

Arcobacter aquimarinus is a species of bacteria first recovered from mussels, with type strain W63^{T} (= CECT 8442^{T} = LMG 27923^{T}).
