= Arcobacter =

Scientific classification
- Domain: Bacteria
- Kingdom: Pseudomonadati
- Phylum: Campylobacterota
- Class: "Campylobacteria"
- Order: Campylobacterales
- Family: Arcobacteraceae; Waite et al. 2020
- Genus: Arcobacter; Vandamme et al. 1991

Type species
- Arcobacter nitrofigilis (McClung et al. 1983) Vandamme et al. 1991

Species
- See text

Genus of bacteria

Arcobacter is a genus of Gram-negative, spiral-shaped bacteria in the phylum Campylobacterota. It shows an unusually wide range of habitats, and some species can be human and animal pathogens. Species of the genus Arcobacter are found in both animal and environmental sources, making them unique among the Campylobacterota.

== Taxonomy ==
This genus currently consists of five species: A. butzleri, A. cryaerophilus, A. skirrowii, A. nitrofigilis, and A. sulfidicus, although several other potential novel species have recently been described from varying environments. Three of these five known species are pathogenic. Members of this genus were first isolated in 1977 from aborted bovine fetuses. They are aerotolerant, Campylobacter-like organisms, previously classified as Campylobacter. The genus Arcobacter, in fact, was created as recently as 1992. Although they are similar to this other genus, Arcobacter species can grow at lower temperatures than Campylobacter, as well as in the air, which Campylobacter cannot.

== Name ==
The name Arcobacter is derived from the Latin arcus meaning "bow" and the Greek bacter meaning "rod", and should be understood to mean "bow-shaped rod" or "curved rod". This is a reference to the characteristic curved shaped that most Arcobacter cells possess.

== Pathogenicity ==
Arcobacter species have been discovered as both animal and human pathogens within the past decade, due to improvements in isolation techniques. Up to now, little is known about the mechanisms of pathogenicity or potential virulence factors of Arcobacter spp. Since no routine diagnostic of these bacteria has been performed, the global prevalence of Arcobacter infection is rather underestimated and the exact routes of transmission are unknown. Some evidence indicates livestock animals may be a significant reservoir of Arcobacter, and over the last few years, the presence of these organisms in raw meat products, as well as in surface and ground water, has received increasing attention.

In humans, A. butzleri, and less commonly, A. cryaerophilus, have been linked to enteritis and occasionally bacteremia. Symptoms of A. butzleri infections include diarrhea associated with abdominal pain, nausea, and vomiting or fever. Studies of patients infected with A. butzleri have demonstrated that without treatment, symptoms endured for a very variable amount of time, from two days to several weeks. When antimicrobial therapies were administered, the infection was eradicated within a few days, and all strains in the study were found to be susceptible to the antibiotics given. A third species, A. skirrowii, has also recently been isolated from a patient with chronic diarrhea.

Although the microbiological and clinical features of Arcobacter are not yet well defined, initial studies of A. butzleri suggest that these bacteria display similar microbiological and clinical features as C. jejuni, but are more associated with a persistent, watery diarrhea than with the bloody diarrhea associated with C. jejuni. Recent studies suggest that A. butzleri induces epithelial barrier dysfunction by changes in tight junction proteins and induction of epithelial apoptosis. Based on this model, the virulence of A. butzleri seems to have two phases. An initial effect on tight junctions was observed first, followed by a late effect on cytotoxicity because of necrosis and induction of apoptosis.

== Nonpathogenic strains ==
A. nitrofigilis is a nitrogen-fixing bacterium isolated from the roots of the salt marsh plant Spartina alterniflora. A. sulfidicus is an obligate microaerophile that oxidizes sulfides and is an autotrophic producer of filamentous sulfur. Large populations of this bacterium produce mats of this solid, white sulfur filament. These mats are useful in anchoring the bacteria to rocky surfaces in the face of flowing subsurface hydrothermal fluids, as well as providing important carpeting around hydrothermal vents that attracts other animals to that site and encourages them to settle and grow. One interesting potential novel Arcobacter species, designated LA31BT, was isolated from water collected from a hypersaline lagoon. Preliminary characterization based on 16S rRNA gene sequence analysis showed that LA31BT shared 94% identity with A. nitrofigilis, the type species of the genus, and taxonomic studies confirmed the phylogenetic affiliation of strain LA31BT to the genus Arcobacter. Other analytical methods, however, showed that LA31BT was distinct from all recognized Arcobacter species. Most notably and of interest, LA31BT was found to be an obligate halophile, a trait not found among recognized Arcobacter species.

Another unusual Arcobacter species, designated strain CAB, was isolated from marine sediment and found to have the capacity to grow via perchlorate reduction, the only member of the Campylobacterota in pure culture to possess this rare metabolism. Unlike most Arcobacter species, CAB was found to degrade carbohydrates, including fructose and catechol, and its cells often lacked the distinctive curvature typical of the genus Arcobacter.

== Phylogeny ==
The currently accepted taxonomy is based on the List of Prokaryotic names with Standing in Nomenclature (LPSN) and National Center for Biotechnology Information (NCBI).

16S rRNA based LTP_10_2024

- Arcobacter
  - - A. lekithochrous
    - - A. roscoffensis
      - - A. antarcticus
        - A. parvus
  - - - A. mytili
      - - A. pacificus
        - - A. halophilus
          - - A. molluscorum
            - - A. canalis Pérez-Cataluña et al. 2018
              - A. marinus
    - - A. nitrofigilis
      - - - A. acticola
          - - A. caeni
            - A. venerupis
        - - - - A. anaerophilus
              - A. ebronensis
            - - A. arenosus
              - A. bivalviorum
          - - - A. ellisii
              - - A. cloacae
                - - A. suis
                  - - A. aquimarinus
                    - A. defluvii
            - - - A. butzleri
                - A. lacus
              - - A. vandammei
                - - - A. faecis
                    - - A. lanthieri
                      - A. vitoriensis
                  - - A. cibarius
                    - - A. cryaerophilus
                      - - A. skirrowii
                        - - A. thereius
                          - A. trophiarum

120 marker proteins based GTDB 10-RS226

- - "Ca. Marinarcus aquaticus" corrig.Pérez-Cataluña et al. 2018
  - - - Malaciobacter
        - M. mytili corrig. (Collado et al. 2009) Pérez-Cataluña et al. 2019
        - - M. molluscorum corrig. (Figueras et al. 2011) Pérez-Cataluña et al. 2019
          - - M. halophilus corrig. (Donachie et al. 2005) Pérez-Cataluña et al. 2019
            - M. marinus corrig. (Kim et al. 2010) Pérez-Cataluña et al. 2019
    - - Arcobacter nitrofigilis (McClung, Patrjiquin & Davis 1983) Vandamme et al. 1991
      - - - Halarcobacter
            - - H. anaerophilus corrig. (Sasi Jyothsna et al. 2013) Pérez-Cataluña et al. 2020
              - H. ebronensis corrig. (Levican et al. 2015) Pérez-Cataluña et al. 2019
            - - "H. arenosus" Baek et al. 2021
              - - H. bivalviorum corrig. (Levican et al. 2012) Pérez-Cataluña et al. 2019
                - "Arcobacter mediterraneus" Rahman et al. 2022
        - - - Arcobacter roscoffensis Pascual et al. 2023
            - - Poseidonibacter
                - P. lekithochrous (Diéguez et al. 2017) Pérez-Cataluña et al. 2019
                - - "P. ostreae" Baek et al. 2023
                  - - P. antarcticus Guo et al. 2019
                    - P. parvus Kim et al. 2021
          - - Malaciobacter pacificus corrig. (Zhang et al. 2016) Pérez-Cataluña et al. 2019
            - - Aliarcobacter
                - - Pseudarcobacter acticola (Park et al. 2016) Pérez-Cataluña et al. 2019
                  - - Arcobacter caeni Pérez-Cataluña, Salas-Massó & Figueras 2019
                    - - Pseudarcobacter suis corrig. (Levican, Collado & Figueras 2013) Pérez-Cataluña et al. 2019
                      - Pseudarcobacter venerupis corrig. (Levican et al. 2012) Pérez-Cataluña et al. 2019
                - - - Pseudarcobacter aquimarinus corrig. (Levican et al. 2015) Pérez-Cataluña et al. 2019
                    - Pseudarcobacter cloacae corrig. (Levican, Collado & Figueras 2013) Pérez-Cataluña et al. 2019
                  - - - Pseudarcobacter defluvii corrig. (Collado et al. 2011) Pérez-Cataluña et al. 2019
                      - Pseudarcobacter ellisii corrig. (Figueras et al. 2011) Pérez-Cataluña et al. 2019
                    - - - A. butzleri (Kiehlbauch et al. 1991) Pérez-Cataluña et al. 2020
                        - Arcobacter lacus Pérez-Cataluña, Salas-Massó & Figueras 2019
                      - - - A. lanthieri (Whiteduck-Léveillée et al. 2015) Pérez-Cataluña et al. 2020
                          - A. vitoriensis Alonso et al. 2021
                        - - - Arcobacter vandammei Kerkhof, On & Houf 2021
                            - - A. cibarius (Houf et al. 2005) Pérez-Cataluña et al. 2020
                              - A. faecis (Whiteduck-Léveillée et al. 2019) Pérez-Cataluña et al. 2020
                          - - - A. cryaerophilus (Neill et al. 1985) Pérez-Cataluña et al. 2020
                              - A. trophiarum (De Smet et al. 2011) Pérez-Cataluña et al. 2020
                            - - A. skirrowii (Vandamme et al. 1992) Pérez-Cataluña et al. 2020
                              - - "Arcobacter porcinus" Figueras et al. 2017
                                - A. thereius (Houf et al. 2009) Pérez-Cataluña et al. 2020

Species incertae sedis:

- "Aliarcobacter hispanicus" Pérez-Cataluña et al. 2018b nom. nud.
- "Arcobacter iocasae" Zhang et al. 2025
- "Arcobacter peruensis" Callbeck et al. 2019
- "Arcobacter ponticus" Cataluña 2018
- "Arcobacter salis" Cataluña 2018
- "Ca. Arcobacter sulfidicus" Wirsen et al. 2002

== See also ==
- List of bacteria genera
- List of bacterial orders
