= Arcobacter suis =

Scientific classification
- Domain: Bacteria
- Kingdom: Pseudomonadati
- Phylum: Campylobacterota
- Class: "Campylobacteria"
- Order: Campylobacterales
- Family: Arcobacteraceae
- Genus: Arcobacter
- Species: A. suis

Binomial name
- Arcobacter suis Levican et al. 2013

Species of bacterium

Arcobacter suis is a species of bacteria first isolated from pork meat. Its type strain is F41^{T} (=CECT 7833^{T} = LMG 26152^{T}).
