= Duke of Portland (ship) =

Several vessels have been named Duke of Portland for one or another Earl of Portland:

== Duke of Portland (1794 ship) ==
- Duke of Portland (1794 ship) was a sailing ship built in 1790 at Bordeaux, France. The British Royal Navy captured her in 1794 after the outbreak of the French Revolutionary Wars. British owners named her Duke of Portland and employed her as a whaler. As such she made some eleven whaling voyages. On the outbound leg of her eighth voyage she transported convicts to Port Jackson, New South Wales. She was last listed in 1811.

== Duke of Portland (whaler) ==
- Duke of Portland (whaler) was an American whaler of 400 tons (bm), that disappeared in 1802 after an attack by Tongans at Tongatapu.

== Duke of Portland (1842 ship) ==
- Duke of Portland (1842 ship), of 468 tons (bm), was built at Troon in 1842. In 1851 and 1852, she carried emigrants to New Zealand under the auspices of the Canterbury Association. She was lost in a fire on 22 November 1857, while on a voyage from Ardrossan to Singapore.
