= Arcobacter canalis =

Scientific classification
- Domain: Bacteria
- Kingdom: Pseudomonadati
- Phylum: Campylobacterota
- Class: "Campylobacteria"
- Order: Campylobacterales
- Family: Arcobacteraceae
- Genus: Arcobacter
- Species: A. canalis

Binomial name
- Arcobacter canalis (Perez-Cataluna et al. 2018) Perez-Cataluna et al. 2018

Type strain
- F138-33, CECT 8984, LMG 29148

Synonyms
- Malacobacter canalis

Species of bacterium

Arcobacter canalis is a bacterium from the genus Arcobacter.
