= Arcobacter cloacae =

Scientific classification
- Domain: Bacteria
- Kingdom: Pseudomonadati
- Phylum: Campylobacterota
- Class: "Campylobacteria"
- Order: Campylobacterales
- Family: Arcobacteraceae
- Genus: Arcobacter
- Species: A. cloacae

Binomial name
- Arcobacter cloacae Levican et al. 2013

Species of bacterium

Arcobacter cloacae is a species of bacteria first isolated from sewage. Its type strain is SW28-13^{T} (=CECT 7834^{T} = LMG 26153^{T}).
