= Different =

Different may refer to:

== Music ==
=== Albums ===
- Different (Kate Ryan album), 2002
- Different (Thomas Anders album), 1989
- Different, an EP (2016) and album (2017) by Micah Tyler, or the title song

=== Songs ===
- "Different" (Band-Maid song), 2020
- "Different" (Le Sserafim song), 2025
- "Different" (Robbie Williams song), 2012
- "Different", by Acceptance from Phantoms, 2005
- "Different", by Burna Boy from African Giant, 2019
- "Different", by Cass Elliot from the soundtrack of the film Pufnstuf, 1970
- "Different", by Dreamscape from 5th Season, 2007
- "Different", by Egypt Central from Egypt Central, 2005
- "Different", by Future and Juice Wrld from Wrld on Drugs, 2018
- "Different", by Jamie Shaw, 2006
- "Different", by No Malice from Hear Ye Him, 2013
- "Different", by Pendulum from In Silico, 2008
- "Different", by Winner from 2014 S/S, 2014
- "Different", by Ximena Sariñana from Ximena Sariñana, 2011

== Other uses ==
- Different ideal, or the different, in algebraic number theory

== See also ==
- Difference (disambiguation)
- Differential (disambiguation)
- Diffident, or shy
