= Walter Bates =

Canadian writer and settler (1760–1842)

- Born: 14 March 1760; Darien, Connecticut
- Died: 11 February 1842 (aged 81)
- Occupation: Writer

Walter Bates (14 March 1760 – 11 February 1842) was a British citizen living in colonial New Brunswick who wrote a popular book about a notorious criminal, Henry More Smith.

== Biography ==
Bates was born on a farm in what is today Darien, Connecticut, the son of John Bates and Sarah Bostwick. During the American War of Independence, he was captured by local rebel sympathizers, who pressured him to reveal locations of British Loyalists, including his brother. After escaping, Bates fled Connecticut and ended up in British-occupied New York City. He later became a farmer and teacher on Long Island, another Loyalist stronghold.

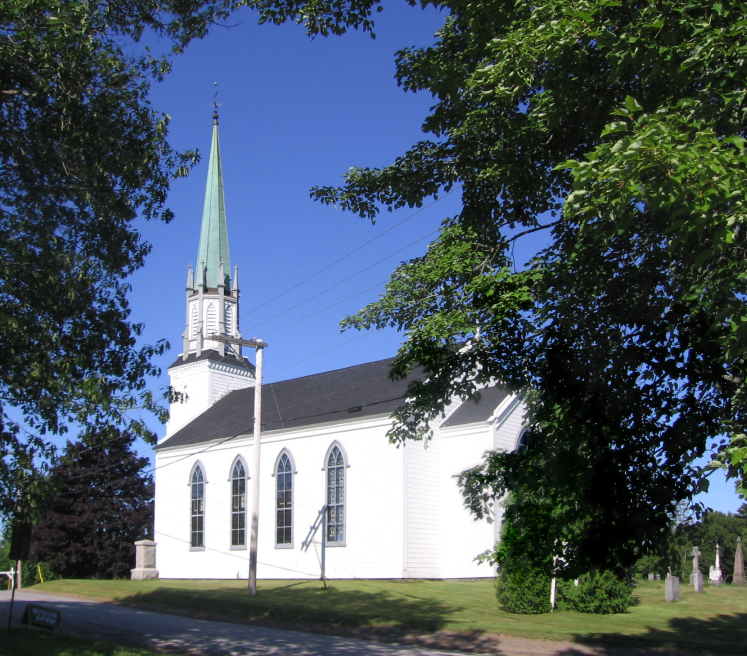
Walter Bates was a founder of Trinity Church in Kingston, New Brunswick

With the end of the war, it became untenable for the Loyalists to remain in New York. In 1783, Bates accepted a British offer of 200 acres (81 ha) of land in New Brunswick, plus two years' supplies and transportation to his new homestead at Kingston, New Brunswick. He was part of the first contingent of Loyalist settlers who sailed in that year on the "Spring Fleet", departing from Huntington Bay, New York on April 11 and arriving in Nova Scotia on April 16, 1783.

Once in Kingston, Bates became a selectman and then served several terms as the high sheriff of Kings County, New Brunswick. He was also a founder of the Anglican Trinity Church in Kingston, completed in 1789. In October 1884, Bates married Abigail Lyon; the couple had four children.

In 1817, Bates wrote The Mysterious Stranger; or, memoirs of Henry More Smith; alias Henry Frederick Moon; alias William Newman: who is now confined in Simbury mines, in Connecticut, for the crime of burglary; containing an account of his . . . confinement in the gaol of King's County, province of New Brunswick . . . with a statement of his succeeding conduct. The book was about a burglar and confidence man named Henry More Smith, whom Bates got to know while Smith was incarcerated in Kingston. The Mysterious Stranger chronicled Smith's jail breaks and comical behavior over a two-year period. However, it also described the local region and the people who had settled it. Published in the United States and the United Kingdom, The Mysterious Stranger sold thousands of copies.

In 1840, Bates had plans to publish a second book about the founding of Kingston and the journey from New York, going so far as to publish a prospectus for potential subscribers. He never completed the book, and he died in Kingston on February 11, 1842. A portion of the work was eventually published in 1889 as Kingston and the loyalists of the "spring fleet" of 1783, by the historian William O. Raymond.
