= Water Street Music Hall =

Concert hall in Rochester, New York, U.S.

- Water Street
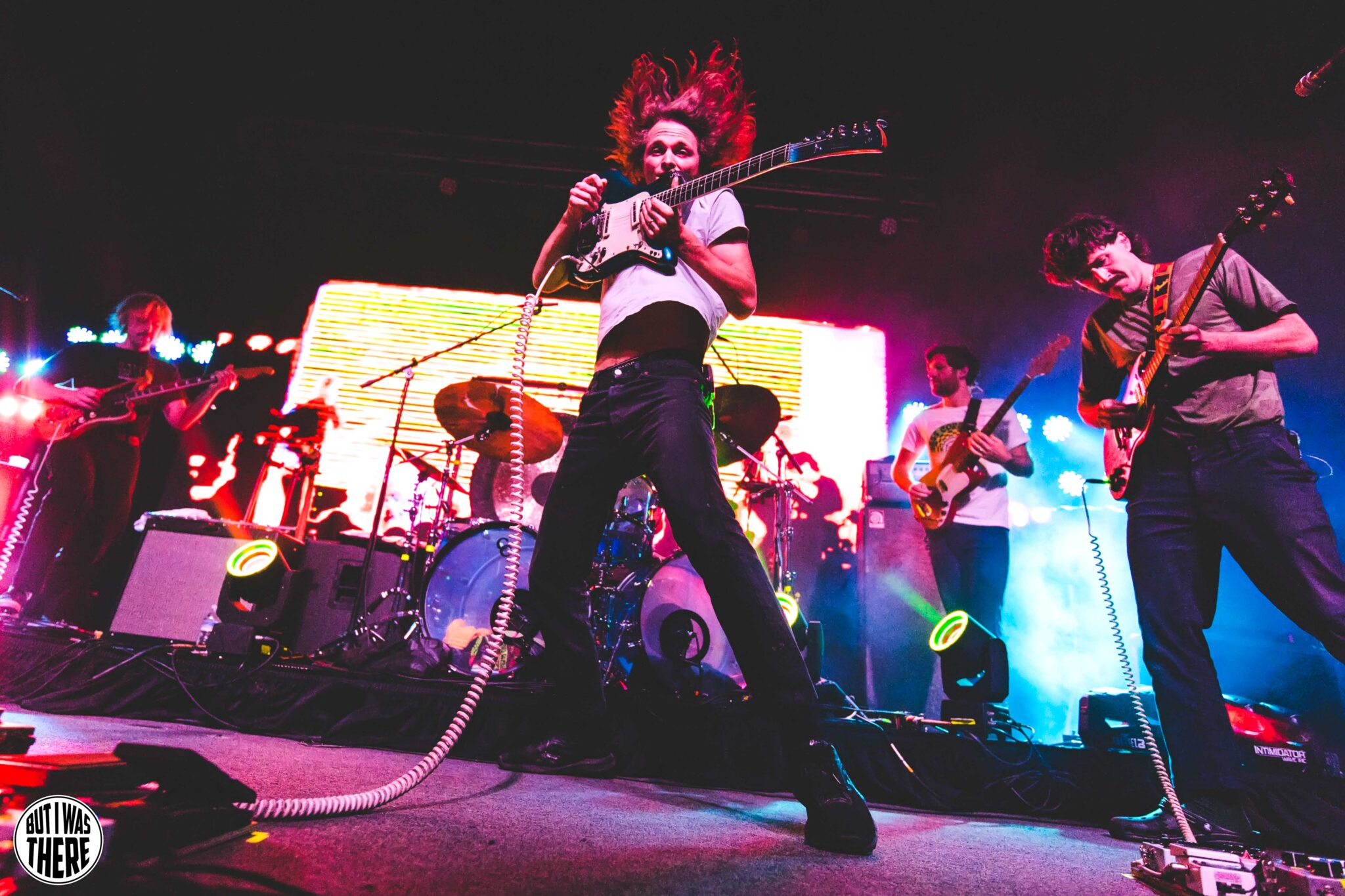
- King Gizzard and The Lizard Wizard Live on May 24, 2022
- Interactive map of Water Street Music Hall
- Former names: The County Warehouse/The Warehouse (1976-1991), The Horizontal Boogie Bar (1992-1999), Club Piranha (1999-2001),
- Address: 204 N. Water St. 14604
- Location: Rochester, New York
- Coordinates: 43°9′38″N 77°36′42″W
- Seating type: General Admission
- Capacity: Hall: 1000; The Club: 500
- Type: Music venue
- Parking: 50

Construction
- Opened: 1976

Website
- waterstreetmusichall.live

Water Street Music Hall is a 1,000 capacity concert venue in Rochester, New York, located in the St. Paul Quarter. WSMH is divided into two spaces; the main hall and The Club at Water St., which is a 500 capacity room for local and regional bands. Both performance spaces offer a full sound system, stage, lights, with a balcony view. Water Street Music Hall has been open in one form or another for forty years.

== History ==
Water Street Music Hall opened in 1999 and has since hosted hundreds of high-profile concerts throughout the past 20+ years with artists including George Clinton and Parliament Funkadelic, David Byrne, Portugal. The Man, Fall Out Boy, Coheed and Cambria, Minus The Bear, Sublime, St. Vincent, and many more. Sept. 27, 1991 Phish played at 204 N. Water Street which was called The Warehouse at the time. Previously known as The Country Warehouse and The Horizontal Boogie Bar which opened in 1976, the name officially changed to Water Street Music Hall in 1999. The venue continued to host a multitude of sold-out shows between 2000 and 2014.

Following an increased trend of incidents occurring at Water Street Music Hall, the tenant at that time decided to sell his business. While it reopened temporarily under a provisional licence from the city, it ultimately resulted in the sale of the business to Syracuse chain, Funk 'N Waffles in February 2017.

As of 2022, Water Street Music Hall has reopened under new ownership and has resumed hosting shows in a variety of genres from music to stand-up comedy performances both in the hall and club sides of the venue. Recent shows have included national touring artists such as Jack Harlow, Pusha T, and King Gizzard and the Lizard Wizard.
