= Differentiable measure =

Measure that has a notion of derivative

In functional analysis and measure theory, a differentiable measure is a measure that has a notion of a derivative. The theory of differentiable measure was introduced by Russian mathematician Sergei Fomin and proposed at the International Congress of Mathematicians in 1966 in Moscow as an infinite-dimensional analog of the theory of distributions. Besides the notion of a derivative of a measure by Sergei Fomin there exists also one by Anatoliy Skorokhod, one by Sergio Albeverio and Raphael Høegh-Krohn, and one by Oleg Smolyanov and Heinrich von Weizsäcker.

== Differentiable measure ==
Let

- $X$ be a real vector space,
- $\mathcal{A}$ be σ-algebra that is invariant under translation by vectors $h\in X$, i.e. $A +th\in \mathcal{A}$ for all $A\in\mathcal{A}$ and $t\in\R$.

This setting is rather general on purpose since for most definitions only linearity and measurability is needed. But usually one chooses $X$ to be a real Hausdorff locally convex space with the Borel or cylindrical σ-algebra $\mathcal{A}$.

For a measure $\mu$ let $\mu_h(A):=\mu(A+h)$ denote the shifted measure by $h\in X$.

=== Fomin differentiability ===
A measure $\mu$ on $(X,\mathcal{A})$ is Fomin differentiable along $h\in X$ if for every set $A\in\mathcal{A}$ the limit

$$d_{h}\mu(A):=\lim\limits_{t\to 0}\frac{\mu(A+th)-\mu(A)}{t}$$

exists. We call $d_{h}\mu$ the Fomin derivative of $\mu$.

Equivalently, for all sets $A\in\mathcal{A}$ is $f_{\mu}^{A,h}:t\mapsto \mu(A+th)$ differentiable in $0$.

==== Properties ====
- The Fomin derivative is again another measure and absolutely continuous with respect to $\mu$.
- Fomin differentiability can be directly extend to signed measures.
- Higher and mixed derivatives will be defined inductively $d^n_{h}=d_{h}(d^{n-1}_{h})$.

=== Skorokhod differentiability ===
Let $\mu$ be a Baire measure and let $C_b(X)$ be the space of bounded and continuous functions on $X$.

$\mu$ is Skorokhod differentiable (or S-differentiable) along $h\in X$ if a Baire measure $\nu$ exists such that for all $f\in C_b(X)$ the limit

$$\lim\limits_{t\to 0}\int_X\frac{ f(x-th)-f(x)}{t}\mu(dx)=\int_X f(x)\nu(dx)$$

exists.

In shift notation

$$\lim\limits_{t\to 0}\int_X\frac{ f(x-th)-f(x)}{t}\mu(dx)=\lim\limits_{t\to 0}\int_Xf\; d\left(\frac{\mu_{th}-\mu}{t}\right).$$

The measure $\nu$ is called the Skorokhod derivative (or S-derivative or weak derivative) of $\mu$ along $h\in X$ and is unique.

=== Albeverio-Høegh-Krohn Differentiability ===
A measure $\mu$ is Albeverio-Høegh-Krohn differentiable (or AHK differentiable) along $h\in X$ if a measure $\lambda\geq 0$ exists such that

1. $\mu_{th}$ is absolutely continuous with respect to $\lambda$ such that $\lambda_{th}=f_t\cdot \lambda$,
2. the map $g:\R\to L^2(\lambda),\; t\mapsto f_{t}^{1/2}$ is differentiable.

==== Properties ====
- The AHK differentiability can also be extended to signed measures.

== Example ==
Let $\mu$ be a measure with a continuously differentiable Radon-Nikodým density $g$, then the Fomin derivative is

$$d_{h}\mu(A)=\lim\limits_{t\to 0}\frac{\mu(A+th)-\mu(A)}{t}=\lim\limits_{t\to 0}\int_A\frac{g(x+th)-g(x)}{t}\mathrm{d}x=\int_A g'(x)\mathrm{d}x.$$

== Bibliography ==
- Bogachev, Vladimir I. (2010). Differentiable Measures and the Malliavin Calculus. American Mathematical Society. pp. 69–72. ISBN 978-0821849934.
- Smolyanov, Oleg G.; von Weizsäcker, Heinrich (1993). "Differentiable Families of Measures". Journal of Functional Analysis. 118 (2): 454–476. doi:10.1006/jfan.1993.1151.
- Bogachev, Vladimir I. (2010). Differentiable Measures and the Malliavin Calculus. American Mathematical Society. pp. 69–72. ISBN 978-0821849934.
- Fomin, Sergei Vasil'evich (1966). "Differential measures in linear spaces". Proc. Int. Congress of Mathematicians, sec.5. Int. Congress of Mathematicians. Moscow: Izdat. Moskov. Univ.
- Kuo, Hui-Hsiung “Differentiable Measures.” Chinese Journal of Mathematics 2, no. 2 (1974): 189–99. JSTOR 43836023.
