= Pendleton (band) =

English band

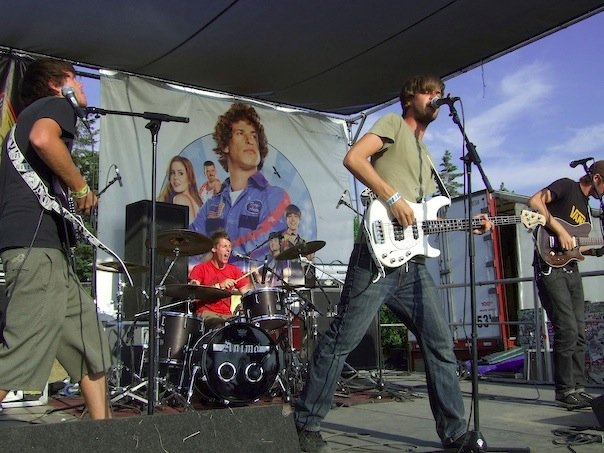
- Pendleton, Vans Warped Tour 2007

Background information
- Origin: Salford, Greater Manchester, United Kingdom
- Genre: Punk rock / Skate punk
- Years active: 2000-2008
- Labels: Angry Penguin Records (US); Bells On Records (Europe/Japan)
- Past members: Mike Hayes; Tommy Slash; Ben Mottershead (“Shooter”); Jason Gough; Lewis; Tom Higgins; Mark Arland
- Website: www.myspace.com/pendletonmusic

Pendleton was an English four-piece skate punk band from Manchester, England. They were formed in 2000 and went through several incarnations before becoming Pendleton in 2002 when several of the band members met at the University of Salford. They were signed to Angry Penguin Records in the US, and Bells On Records in Europe and Japan.

== History ==
=== You, By Us ===
Pendleton were formed at the University of Salford in 2002, and spent several years honing their sound and self-releasing their own material. Although previously adherents to the DIY punk ethic Pendleton eventually released their debut EP 'You, by Us' in the UK in August 2006 on (the now defunct) Distort Manchester Records. The release garnered some critical acclaim with punk music website Punktastic.com describing Pendleton as "the best skate punk band in the UK".

A video for the song "Falling Apart to Double Time" was released at the same time as the EP, and was played on rotation on MTV2, notably on the 'Headbangers Ball' show presented by Jamey Jasta of Hatebreed.

After several months of touring to promote the release Pendleton were picked up by Bells On Records Japan who released an extended version of the EP in Japan in January 2007. The band were also signed by Angry Penguin Records and subsequently released the extended edition of You, by Us in the US in May 2007. The extended versions of the EP contained bonus songs off Pendleton's previous, self-released, EP Stamp out the Japanazis.

=== 2007 Warped Tour ===
Pendleton were invited to join Angry Penguin Records on the Vans Warped Tour 2007 and subsequently to tour the US during fall 2007. Whilst on the Warped Tour Pendleton recorded a spot for Fuse TV which discussed their experience of being a small and relatively unknown British band touring America for the first time. Pendleton were also one of the bands featured on a promotional video for the Keep A Breast Foundation highlighting the importance of regular checks for breast cancer. The band continued to tour the US and Europe throughout 2007 and 2008.

=== The Difference ===
After a line-up change, Pendleton released their debut album The Difference in July 2008. It was recorded at NADA Studios in New Windsor, New York with producer John Naclerio, noted for working with My Chemical Romance, Senses Fail, Bayside and Brand New. The band went their separate ways shortly after the release of the album, however to date there has been no statement from the members involved as to the reasons behind the split.

== Current status ==
Tom Higgins is currently a member of the band Empires Fade.

== Discography ==
- You, by Us (2006, Distort Manchester Records)
- You, by Us: Extended Edition - USA and Japan (2007, Angry Penguin Records [US] / Bells On Records [Japan])
- The Difference (2008, Angry Penguin Records)
