= Duke of Portland (whaler) =

American whaler

History
- Fate: Disappeared June 1802

General characteristics
- Type: Whaler
- Tons burthen: 400 (bm)

Duke of Portland was an American whaler of 400 tons.

She was registered in Boston, United States and left Norfolk Island in June 1802, under the command of Captain Lovat Melon. At some stage during that month she stopped at Tongatapu, Tonga.

There a runaway seaman by the name of Doyle helped the Tongans capture Duke of Portland. They spared the lives of a white woman, Elizabeth (or Eliza) Morley (or Morey, or Moray), a black woman, an old man, and four boys. While the Tongans were plundering the vessel of her iron, the old man and the boys killed Doyle, drove the Tongans off, cut her cables, and set out to sea. Duke of Portland was never heard from again. Morley became a wife of the Tongan chief Teukava.

On 2 October 1804, the American ship Union arrived. Her captain and seven men came ashore, where the natives killed them. Morley came out in a canoe, called out that the Tongans had killed the shore party, leaped overboard, and swam to the ship. The crew took her aboard, held off the Tongans, and then sailed with her to Sydney. After they left her there Union sailed for Fiji, where she was wrecked.
