= The Difference (album) =

Studio album by Pendleton
- Released: 1 July 2008
- Recorded: 2008
- Studio: NADA Studios, New Windsor, New York
- Genre: Punk rock, skate punk
- Label: Angry Penguin Records
- Producer: John Naclario

Pendleton chronology
You, by Us: Extended Edition (2007)	The Difference (2008)

The Difference is the first full-length release from UK skate punk band Pendleton. It was released on 1 July 2008 by Angry Penguin Records. It followed the band's previously released EP, You, by Us.

The Difference was recorded at NADA Studios in New Windsor, New York with producer John Naclerio, famed for working with bands such as My Chemical Romance, Senses Fail, Bayside and Brand New.

Despite the success of the band's previous release, You, by Us and the high-profile production of The Difference, the band parted ways soon after the release of the album. Whilst no statement has been forthcoming from the band as the reasons behind the split, several line up changes occurred immediately prior to the recording of The Difference (particularly the departure of original frontman Mike Hayes). It is possible that this instability led to the bands downfall.

== Track listing ==
1. "Getting Hit in the Face with my Own Punchline" – 0:55
2. "View Humans as Cattle" – 2:38
3. "What I've Learned" – 3:34
4. "The Difference" – 3:09
5. "Tonight we Pray to Different Gods" – 3:02
6. "Falling Apart to Double Time" – 3:15
7. "Shotgun vs. Beatdown" – 2.21
8. "Give Up" – 2:44
9. "Back at Home" – 3:26
10. "Between the ROC and a Hard Place" – 4:02
11. "Ever Get the Feeling You've Been Cheated?" – 0:37
