= Difference =

Difference commonly refers to:

- Difference (philosophy), the set of properties by which items are distinguished
- Difference (mathematics), the result of a subtraction

Difference, The Difference, Differences or Differently may also refer to:

== Music ==
- Difference (album), by Dreamtale, 2005
- The Difference (album), Pendleton, 2008
- "The Difference" (The Wallflowers song), 1997
- "Differences" (song), by Ginuwine, 2001
- Differently (album), by Cassie Davis, 2009
  - "Differently" (song), by Cassie Davis, 2009
- "Difference", a song by Benjamin Clementine from the 2022 album And I Have Been
- "Difference", a song by Childish Gambino from the 2010 mixtape Culdesac
- "The Difference", a song by Matchbox Twenty from the 2002 album More Than You Think You Are
- "The Difference", a song by Westlife from the 2009 album Where We Are
- "The Difference", a song by Nick Jonas from the 2016 album Last Year Was Complicated
- "The Difference", a song by Meek Mill featuring Quavo, from the 2016 mixtape DC4
- "The Difference", a 2020 song by Flume featuring Toro y Moi
- "The Difference", a 2022 song by Ni/Co which represented Alabama in the American Song Contest

== Science and mathematics ==
- Difference equation, a type of recurrence relation
- Differencing, in statistics, an operation on time-series data
- Data differencing, in computer science
- Set difference, the result of removing the elements of a set from another set

== Other uses ==
- Difference (heraldry), or cadency, a way of distinguishing similar coats of arms
- Differences (journal), a journal of feminist cultural studies
- "Differences", a Series D episode of the television series QI (2006)

== See also ==
- Different (disambiguation)
- Differential (disambiguation)
- Distinction (disambiguation)
- Deference, submitting to one's superior
- Différance, a French term coined by Jacques Derrida
