= Cannibal Culture =

1995 book by Deborah Root

Cannibal Culture: Art, Appropriation and the Commodification of Difference (ISBN 0-8133-2089-5) is a book by Deborah Root, published in 1995 by Westview Press.

The book studies the assimilation of various cultures by other, dominant cultures, and the false assumptions this produces in perceptions of the less dominant culture or ethnicity.

== Reviews ==
- Frank J. Korom (Fall 1997). "Cannibal Culture: Art, Appropriation, and the Commodification of Difference". Museum Anthropology. 21 (2): 93–95. doi:10.1525/mua.1997.21.2.93. Archived from the original on 2013-02-21.
- Kenneth Little (Dec 1996). "Cannibal Culture: Art, Appropriation, and the Commodification of Difference". American Anthropologist. 98 (4): 920. doi:10.1525/aa.1996.98.4.02a00670.
