= Differential =

Differential may refer to:

== Mathematics ==
- Differential (mathematics) comprises multiple related meanings of the word, both in calculus and differential geometry, such as an infinitesimal change in the value of a function
  - Differential of a function, represents a change in the linearization of a function
    - Total differential is its generalization for functions of multiple variables
  - Differential (infinitesimal) (e.g. dx, dy, dt etc.) are interpreted as infinitesimals
- Differential (pushforward) The total derivative of a map between manifolds.
- Differential (coboundary), in homological algebra and algebraic topology, one of the maps of a cochain complex

== Science and technology ==
- Differential (mechanical device), as part of a motor vehicle drivetrain, the device that allows driving wheels or axles on opposite sides to rotate at different speeds
  - Limited-slip differential
- Differential steering, the steering method used by tanks and similar tracked vehicles
- Electronic differential, an electric motor controller which substitutes its mechanical counterpart with significant advantages in electric vehicle application
- Differential signaling, in electronics, applies to a method of transmitting electronic signals over a pair of wires to reduce interference
- Differential amplifier, an electronic amplifier that amplifies signals.

== Social sciences ==
- Semantic and structural differentials in psychology
- Quality spread differential, in finance
- Compensating differential, in labor economics

== Medicine ==
- Differential diagnosis, the characterization of the underlying cause of pathological states based on specific tests
- White blood cell differential, the enumeration of each type of white blood cell either manually or using automated analyzers

== Other ==
- Differential hardening, in metallurgy
- Differential rotation, in astronomy
- Differential centrifugation, in cell biology
- Differential scanning calorimetry, in materials science
- Differential signalling, in communications
- Differential GPS, in satellite navigation technology
- Differential interferometry in radar
- Differential, an extended play by The Sixth Lie
- Handicap differential, part of the calculation used in producing golf handicaps

== See also ==
- Different (disambiguation)
