= Fanning & Coles =

American firm involved in the Maritime fur trade

- Company type: Trading firm
- Industry: Maritime trade
- Founded: 1798 in New York City, United States
- Founders: Edmund Fanning, Willet Coles
- Defunct: 1815
- Fate: Dissolved
- Headquarters: New York City, United States
- Area served: South America, Pacific Ocean, China

Fanning & Coles was an American firm engaged in the Old China Trade and related Maritime fur trade. The two principal partners were sea captain Edmund Fanning and financier Willet Coles. The firm existed from 1798 to 1815, owning several large mercantile vessels. Sailing from New York City to South America and later the Pacific Ocean, the American vessels would gather and purchase seal skins throughout southern Atlantic and Pacific. These valuable pelts included hides from the South American fur seal. After a successful voyage around Cape Horn and enough animal furs were gathered, the vessels from Fanning & Coles then typically sailed for the Qing Dynasty port of Guangzhou, China. Here valuable Chinese manufactured goods were purchased, which included nankeens and porcelain, in addition to stockpiles of tea commonly valued and sold for $40,000 in profits annually.

On the 1798 voyage of the Betsey they caught 100,000 seals which were sold in China.

On several voyages they discovered new uncharted islands such as Fanning Island and Palmyra Atoll. Coles and Fanning secured permission President James Madison for an expedition to the Fiji Island to buy rare woods for trade with China.

The firm built the 290 ton Tonquin. The firm sold the Tonquin to John Jacob Astor's Pacific Fur Company for $37,000 in 1810. The Tonquin was sent to the Northwest to trade furs.

Willett Coles also owned a manhattan rum distillery with his father Stephen Coles. He is listed in 1811 as a founding member of a group that chartered the original Bank of America in NY. Coles was one of the first presidents of the New York City Fire Department (1808). The Coles were descendants of original settler Robert Coles who founded the settlement of Glen Cove, NY. ( originally called Musketa Cove)

Sources are the books written by Edmund Fanning on the voyages of the Betsey, national archives of the US, presidential documents of Jefferson, Monroe and Madison.

== Bibliography ==
- Albion, Robert Greenhalgh (1970), The Rise of New York Port, 1815–1860, Newton Abbot: David & Charles Page 206
- Buck, Peter Henry (1953), Explorers of the Pacific: European and American discoveries in Polynesia, Special Publication, Honolulu: Bernice P. Bishop Museum Pages 65–66
- Fanning, Edmund (1838), Voyages to the South Seas, Indian and Pacific Oceans (4th ed.), New York: William H. Vermilye
- Gallatin, Albert (1879), Adams, Henry (ed.), The Writings of Albert Gallatin, vol. 1, Philadelphia: J. B. Lippincott & Co. p. 387 GALLATIN TO JEFFERSON. WASHINGTON, 16 May 1808. (1 Sec the reply to this letter in Jefferson's Works, v. 290, dated May 17, 1808.)
- Gidmark, Jill B., ed. (2001), Encyclopedia of American Literature of the Sea and Great Lakes, Westport, CT: Greenwood Press Page 134
- Hooper, Robert (1829), Lexicon Medicum: Or, Medical Dictionary, vol. 1 (4th ed.), New York: J. & J. Harper Page 263
- Johnson, William (1883), Reports of Cases adjudged in the Court of Chancery of New York, vol. 3 (3rd ed.), New York: Banks & Brothers Page 587
- Martin, Fredericka A. (1946), The Hunting of the Silver Fleece: Epic of the Fur Seal, New York: Greenburg Page 112
- Porter, Kenneth W. (1931), John Jacob Astor: Business Man, vol. 1, Cambridge, MA: Harvard University Press Page 152 110 Astor had also, on April 7, 1810, imported some China goods on the ship Chinese, owned by E. & H. Fanning and W. Coles.111 The 4000 pieces of yellow .
- Teller, Walter Magnes, ed. (1960), Five Sea Captains, New York: Atheneum - Page 107
- Struik, Dirk Jan (1992), Yankee Science in the Making (4th ed.), New York: Dover Publications, INC. Page 128 From 1797 to 1798 he sailed in the 93-ton Betsey around Cape Horn, hunted seals
