= Hamster polyomavirus =

Virus classification
- (unranked): Virus
- Realm: Monodnaviria
- Kingdom: Shotokuvirae
- Phylum: Cossaviricota
- Class: Papovaviricetes
- Order: Sepolyvirales
- Family: Polyomaviridae
- Genus: Alphapolyomavirus
- Species: Alphapolyomavirus mauratus

Synonyms
- Mesocricetus auratus polyomavirus 1

Unenveloped double-stranded DNA virus

Hamster polyomavirus (abbreviated HaPyV or HaPV, (Note: This was the historically common abbreviation; however, it is ambiguous because it is also used for hamster parvovirus.) scientific name Alphapolyomavirus mauratus) is an unenveloped double-stranded DNA virus of the polyomavirus family whose natural host is the hamster. It was originally described in 1967 by Arnold Graffi as a cause of epithelioma in Syrian hamsters (Mesocricetus auratus).

== Genome and taxonomy ==
The organization of the HaPyV genome is typical of polyomaviruses. At around 5.3 kilobase pairs in length, it contains genes for the small, middle, and large tumor antigens and three viral coat proteins, VP1, VP2, and VP3. In the 2015 taxonomic update to the polyomavirus group, the International Committee on Taxonomy of Viruses classified HaPyV in the genus Alphapolyomavirus, whose type species is mouse polyomavirus (MPyV).

HaPyV and MPyV are closely genetically related; until recently, they were the only two members of the polyomavirus family known to express the middle tumor antigen protein, which is uniquely efficient at inducing neoplastic transformation in infected cells, resulting in transformation in in vitro cell culture and in the formation of tumors in vivo. In 2015 the genome sequence of a rat polyomavirus was reported to contain middle tumor antigen as well, consistent with expectations that it evolved uniquely in the rodent lineage of the polyomavirus family. However, middle tumor antigen has also recently been reported in at least one virus of unrelated lineage, the trichodysplasia spinulosa polyomavirus, which is a normally asymptomatic infection in humans that sometimes causes trichodysplasia spinulosa in immunocompromised individuals.

== Structure ==
Following the typical pattern for polyomaviruses, the HaPyV viral capsid contains three proteins: VP1, VP2, and VP3, of which VP1 is the primary component. VP1 monomers assemble into a closed icosahedral structure. However, the HaPyV capsid differs from its close relative MPyV and from another well-studied polyomavirus, SV40, in having a T=7 levo rather than dextro symmetry.

== Infection and clinical manifestations ==
Hamster polyomavirus was originally identified in hamster epithelial tumors, where virus particles can be readily detected. When the virus is injected into juvenile hamsters from naive populations, it induces leukemias and lymphomas which are free of virus particles but whose cells contain extra-chromosomal viral DNA. This observation is in contrast to the skin tumors, which carry substantial viral loads. The capacity to induce hematopoietic tumors is unusual for polyomaviruses and may be associated with the properties of the HaPyV middle tumor antigen.

HaPyV has primarily been reported in research colonies; it appeared apparently spontaneously in the colony from which it was first described and in which it became enzootic. It was also identified in a 2001 case report as naturally occurring in a pet Syrian hamster. It is shed in urine and this is believed to be the mechanism for transmission, similar to what is observed in mouse polyomavirus. While many known hamster viruses are clinically inapparent, HaPyV (along with hamster parvovirus) is unusual in causing clinically significant disease. The virulence of HaPyV in Syrian hamsters may be due to cross-species transmission from the European hamster, most likely the natural host.
