= New Jersey polyomavirus =

Virus classification
- (unranked): Virus
- Realm: Monodnaviria
- Kingdom: Shotokuvirae
- Phylum: Cossaviricota
- Class: Papovaviricetes
- Order: Sepolyvirales
- Family: Polyomaviridae
- Genus: Alphapolyomavirus
- Species: Alphapolyomavirus terdecihominis

Synonyms
- Human polyomavirus 13

Polyomavirus that infects humans

New Jersey polyomavirus (NJPyV, also known as Human polyomavirus 13) is a virus of the polyomavirus family that infects human hosts. It was first identified in 2014 in a pancreatic transplant patient in New Jersey. It is the 13th and most recent human polyomavirus to be described.

== Discovery ==
NJPyV was first reported in 2014 after it was isolated from epithelial cells of a pancreatic transplant patient presenting with blindness, vasculitis, myopathy, and dermatosis. After doctors were unable to identify known viral causes of the patient's symptoms, a research team led by virologist Ian Lipkin screened samples of affected tissue for the presence of novel viruses, and identified the genome of a novel polyomavirus.

== Genome ==
The organization of the NJPyV genome is typical of polyomaviruses. At around 5.1 kilobase pairs in length, it contains six identifiable genes: the small tumor antigen, large tumor antigen, and alternative tumor antigen (ALTO); and three viral coat proteins, VP1, VP2, and VP3. The ALTO protein is an unusual alternative splicing product of the "late region" of the genome, which canonically encodes the small and large tumor antigens; expression of ALTO has also been reported in trichodysplasia spinulosa polyomavirus.

== Taxonomy ==
In the 2015 taxonomic update to the polyomavirus group, the International Committee on Taxonomy of Viruses classified NJPyV as a member of the genus Alphapolyomavirus, along with murine polyomavirus (Alphapolyomavirus muris).

== Prevalence ==
The prevalence of NJPyV is unknown, though other human polyomaviruses are fairly common and usually asymptomatic. Only a small number of studies have yet attempted to screen for NJPyV seroprevalence in the general population. Although one study reported its prevalence at nearly 60% of the study population, others have found prevalence to be very low or undetectable. It is unclear if the New Jersey index case was newly infected at the time symptoms manifested, or if a latent infection was reactivated in the context of stress and immunosuppression (a known mechanism of pathogenicity for polyomaviruses).

== Clinical manifestations ==
NJPyV was discovered in clinical samples from a single patient; outside of this case report, the clinical effects of NJPyV are unknown.
