= Sorex araneus polyomavirus 1 =

Virus classification
- (unranked): Virus
- Realm: Monodnaviria
- Kingdom: Shotokuvirae
- Phylum: Cossaviricota
- Class: Papovaviricetes
- Order: Sepolyvirales
- Family: Polyomaviridae
- Genus: Alphapolyomavirus
- Species: Sorex araneus polyomavirus 1

Species of virus

Sorex araneus polyomavirus 1, formerly known as Human polyomavirus 12 (HPyV12), is a virus of the polyomavirus family that was first identified in human hosts and also infects shrews. It was discovered and reported in 2013 after isolation from the organs of the gastrointestinal tract, particularly the liver. The virus was renamed to Sorex araneus polyomavirus 1 in 2018, after discovery of the same virus in shrews. Infecting multiple hosts is rare among mammalian polyomaviruses.

== Discovery ==
HPyV12 was first discovered in 2013 by generic PCR used to screen samples of the organs of the gastrointestinal tract. HPyV12 was identified first and most commonly in liver samples; it was also occasionally detected in the colon and rectum and in feces.

== Taxonomy ==
The HPyV12 genome follows the typical organization for a polyomavirus, containing a small and large tumor antigen and three viral capsid proteins; it has no open reading frame corresponding to an agnoprotein. In the 2015 taxonomic update to the polyomavirus group, the International Committee on Taxonomy of Viruses classified HPyV12 as a member of the genus Alphapolyomaviridae, whose type species is murine polyomavirus (Mus musculus polyomavirus 1). Following the discovery of highly similar polyomaviruses in shrews (Soricidae), the virus was formally reclassified in 2018 as Sorex araneus polyomavirus 1.

== Prevalence ==
The prevalence of HPyV12 is not well characterized and published estimates from seroprevalence studies — that is, prevalence of detectable antibodies against viral proteins indicating either past or present exposure — vary widely. A 2013 survey found that between 15–33% of healthy adults exhibited evidence of exposure, with slightly lower rates in children. By contrast, a 2018 study in an Italian population reported over 90% prevalence, while another 2018 survey in Dutch adults found prevalence to be around 4%, among the lowest of the polyomaviruses known to infect humans.

== Clinical manifestations ==
There is no known clinical significance associated with HPyV12.
