= Robert Cardiff =

Robert D. Cardiff is an American pathologist, educator, and scientist who is a distinguished professor emeritus at the University of California, Davis (UC Davis). His research has focused on comparative pathology, mammary tumor biology, genetically engineered mouse models of human cancer, pathology informatics, and medical education. He served as chair of the Department of Pathology at UC Davis from 1990 to 1996 and was the founding director of the university's Center for Medical Informatics and the Mutant Mouse Pathology Facility.

Cardiff is particularly associated with the comparative pathological analysis of mouse models of mammary cancer. His later career also involved the use of whole-slide imaging and digital pathology to develop international research collaborations and large-scale archives of pathological material from genetically modified mice.

== Early life and education ==
Cardiff received a Bachelor of Science degree in entomology and parasitology from the University of California, Berkeley, graduating magna cum laude. He earned his M.D. from the University of California, San Francisco in 1962 and completed residency training in anatomic pathology at the University of Oregon Medical School in Portland.

He subsequently returned to the University of California, Berkeley, where he obtained a Ph.D. in zoology as a National Institutes of Health research fellow. His doctoral and early research work involved molecular biology and tumor viruses.

From 1968 to 1970, Cardiff served in the United States Army Medical Corps at the Walter Reed Army Institute of Research during the Vietnam era. His work there included the application of radioisotope techniques to virology research. He left military service with the rank of lieutenant colonel.

== Career ==
Cardiff joined the faculty of the University of California, Davis School of Medicine in the early 1970s. He served for approximately two decades as vice chair of pathology and was chair of the Department of Pathology from 1990 to 1996.

His educational work extended to comparative pathology and the interpretation of genetically engineered mouse models. Through the Mutant Mouse Pathology Facility and the Center for Genomic Pathology, he participated in training researchers and pathologists in the evaluation of experimental tumors.

== Research ==
=== Comparative pathology ===
Cardiff's research has focused on comparative pathology, particularly the relationship between genetically engineered mouse models and human breast cancer. Throughout his career, he emphasized that meaningful translation between mouse and human disease requires careful pathological interpretation alongside molecular and genetic analysis. His work helped establish standardized pathological criteria for evaluating experimental cancer models and correlating genotype with tumor phenotype.

=== Mammary tumor biology ===
Much of Cardiff's scientific work has concerned mammary tumor biology and the progression of breast cancer. His research built upon the pioneering transplantation studies of his mentor, Kenneth B. ("Papa") DeOme, who developed the mammary gland test-by-transplant methodology for evaluating premalignant lesions. Working with leading mammary biologists including Dan Medina and Gilbert (Gil) Smith, Cardiff contributed the pathological interpretation of these experimental models. As the only M.D. pathologist within this collaborative research group, he translated findings from mouse mammary biology into concepts applicable to human breast pathology.

Using transplantation studies together with genetically engineered mouse models, Cardiff investigated the multistep development of mammary carcinoma, precancerous lesions, tumor progression, and genotype-phenotype relationships. His work demonstrated how experimentally defined lesions in mice could improve understanding of the biological evolution of human breast cancer while recognizing the important differences between experimental animal models and clinical pathology.

=== Genetically engineered mouse models ===
As genetically engineered mouse models became central to cancer research, Cardiff helped establish pathological standards for their evaluation. His collaborative studies examined models involving HER2/neu, cyclin D1, and polyomavirus middle T antigen (PyMT/PyV-mT), contributing to the classification of mammary lesions and supporting the concept of multistep mammary carcinogenesis. Through his work with the National Cancer Institute's Mouse Models of Human Cancers Consortium and other international collaborations, he promoted standardized pathological terminology that enabled comparisons among diverse experimental models.

=== Digital pathology and medical informatics ===
Cardiff was an early advocate of medical informatics and later became a pioneer in the application of digital pathology to comparative cancer research. As founding director of the UC Davis Center for Medical Informatics, he promoted the use of information technology in pathology and medical education. Following his retirement, he developed a large digital archive of whole-slide images from the Mutant Mouse Pathology Facility, allowing investigators worldwide to review pathological specimens remotely.

=== Digital pathology and collaborative research ===
Cardiff's early national and later international comparative pathology practice developed with his utilization of the Internet's ever-expanding capabilities and from his interactions with Philip Leder's laboratory at Harvard Medical School. Cardiff experienced a short sabbatical period at the Leder lab in 2000 where he recognized their need for comparative pathology of human and mice. He was able to fill that need remotely using the Internet and digital images. Many of Leder's trainees continued to seek his comparative pathology expertise after establishing independent research programs. These collaborations also led to his participation in the NIH Annapolis Meeting that contributed to the formation of the Mouse Models of Human Cancers Consortium (MMHCC), and was followed by his early adoption of whole-slide digital imaging technology with Dr. José Galvez, including the acquisition of one of Aperio's first ScanScope systems, facilitating the expansion of his digital pathology consultations internationally.

=== History and philosophy of science ===
In addition to laboratory research, Cardiff contributed to the history and philosophy of science. At UC Davis, he helped establish educational programs examining the historical and conceptual foundations of biomedical research and authored publications exploring the evolution of scientific ideas, experimental cancer models, and pathology.

== Notable publications ==
The following are some of Cardiff's most notable publications, particularly for his contributions to cancer research and genomic pathology:

- Guy, Chantale T.; Cardiff, Robert D.; Muller, William J. (1992-03-01). "Induction of Mammary Tumors by Expression of Polyomavirus Middle T Oncogene: A Transgenic Mouse Model for Metastatic Disease". Molecular and Cellular Biology. 12 (3): 954–961. doi:10.1128/mcb.12.3.954-961.1992. ISSN 1098-5549. PMC 369527. PMID 1312220.
- Guy, C T; Webster, M A; Schaller, M; Parsons, T J; Cardiff, R D; Muller, W J (1992-11-15). "Expression of the neu protooncogene in the mammary epithelium of transgenic mice induces metastatic disease". Proceedings of the National Academy of Sciences. 89 (22): 10578–10582. Bibcode:1992PNAS...8910578G. doi:10.1073/pnas.89.22.10578. ISSN 0027-8424. PMC 50384. PMID 1359541.
- Wang, T. C.; Cardiff, R. D.; Zukerberg, L.; Lees, E.; Arnold, A.; Schmidt, E. V. (1994-06-23). "Mammary hyperplasia and carcinoma in MMTV-cyclin D1 transgenic mice". Nature. 369 (6482): 669–671. Bibcode:1994Natur.369..669W. doi:10.1038/369669a0. ISSN 0028-0836. PMID 8208295. S2CID 4372375.
- Shachaf, Catherine M.; Kopelman, Andrew M.; Arvanitis, Constadina; Karlsson, Asa; Beer, Shelly; Mandl, Stefanie; Bachmann, Michael H.; Borowsky, Alexander D.; Ruebner, Boris; Cardiff, Robert D.; Yang, Qiwei; Bishop, J. Michael; Contag, Christopher H.; Felsher, Dean W. (2004-10-28). "MYC inactivation uncovers pluripotent differentiation and tumour dormancy in hepatocellular cancer". Nature. 431 (7012): 1112–1117. Bibcode:2004Natur.431.1112S. doi:10.1038/nature03043. ISSN 1476-4687. PMID 15475948. S2CID 4412899.
- De Craene, Bram; Berx, Geert (2006-07-05). "Snail in the frame of malignant tumor recurrence". Breast Cancer Research. 8 (4): 105. doi:10.1186/bcr1521. ISSN 1465-542X. PMC 1779474. PMID 16834762.
