= Minor capsid proteins VP2 and VP3 =

Minor capsid protein VP2

Identifiers
- Symbol: VP2
- Pfam: PF00761
- InterPro: IPR001070
Available protein structures:
- Pfam: structures / ECOD
- PDB: RCSB PDB; PDBe; PDBj
- PDBsum: structure summary

Minor capsid protein VP2 and minor capsid protein VP3 are viral proteins that are components of the polyomavirus capsid. Polyomavirus capsids are composed of three proteins; the major component is major capsid protein VP1, which self-assembles into pentamers that in turn self-assemble into enclosed icosahedral structures. The minor components are VP2 and VP3, which bind in the interior of the capsid.

== Gene expression ==
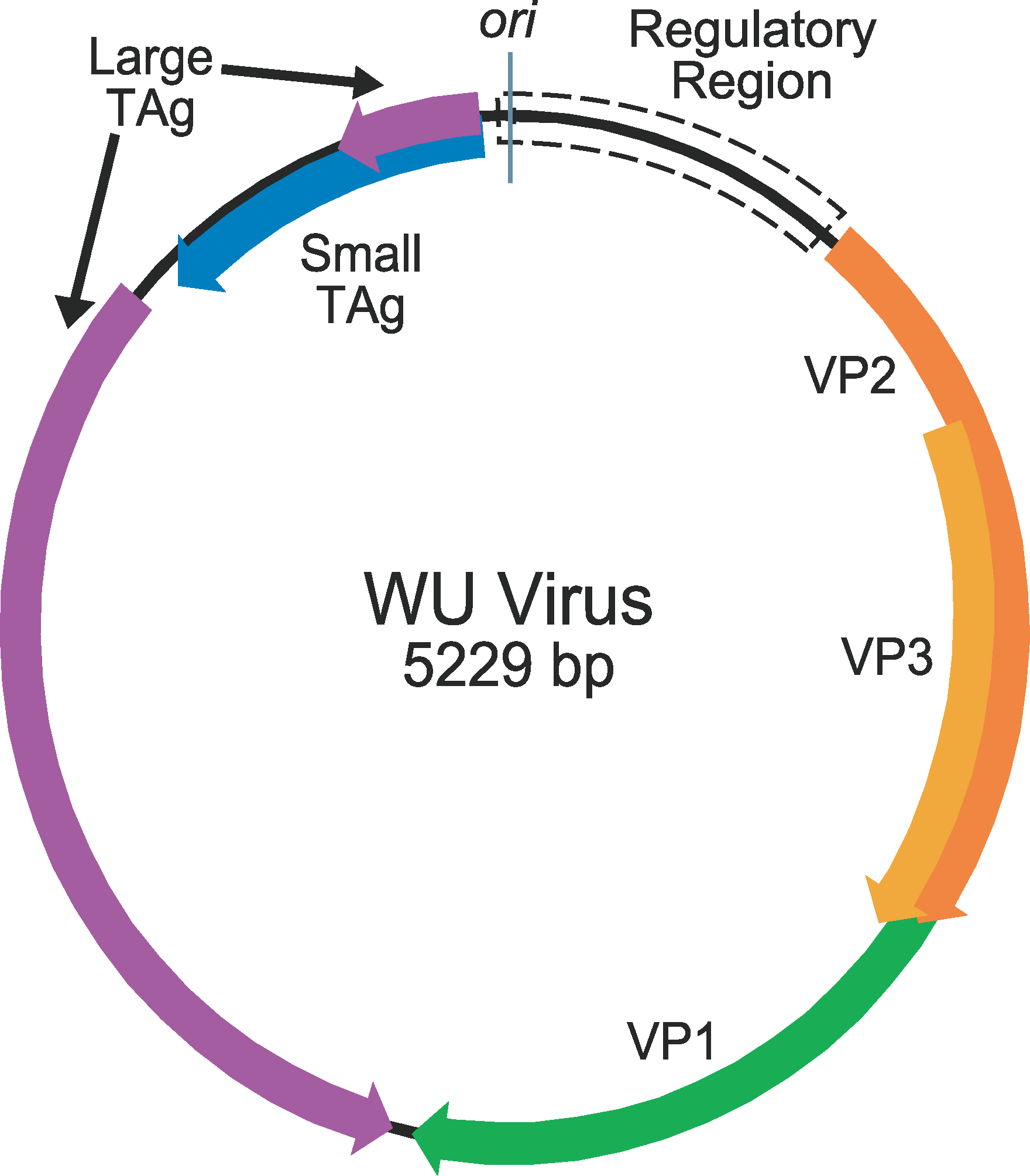
The circular genome of a representative polyomavirus, WU polyomavirus, with the late region at right indicating positions of the VP1, VP2, and VP3 genes.

All three capsid proteins are expressed from alternative start sites on a single transcript of the "late region" of the circular viral chromosome (so named because it is transcribed late in the process of viral infection). The VP3 start site is in frame downstream from that of VP2; in consequence VP3's sequence is identical to the C-terminal portion of VP2, which has an additional N-terminal extension. In at least some polyomaviruses, the VP2 N-terminus is myristoylated. Some members of the polyomavirus family, such as Merkel cell polyomavirus, do not appear to encode or express VP3, though VP2 is present.

== Structure and interactions ==
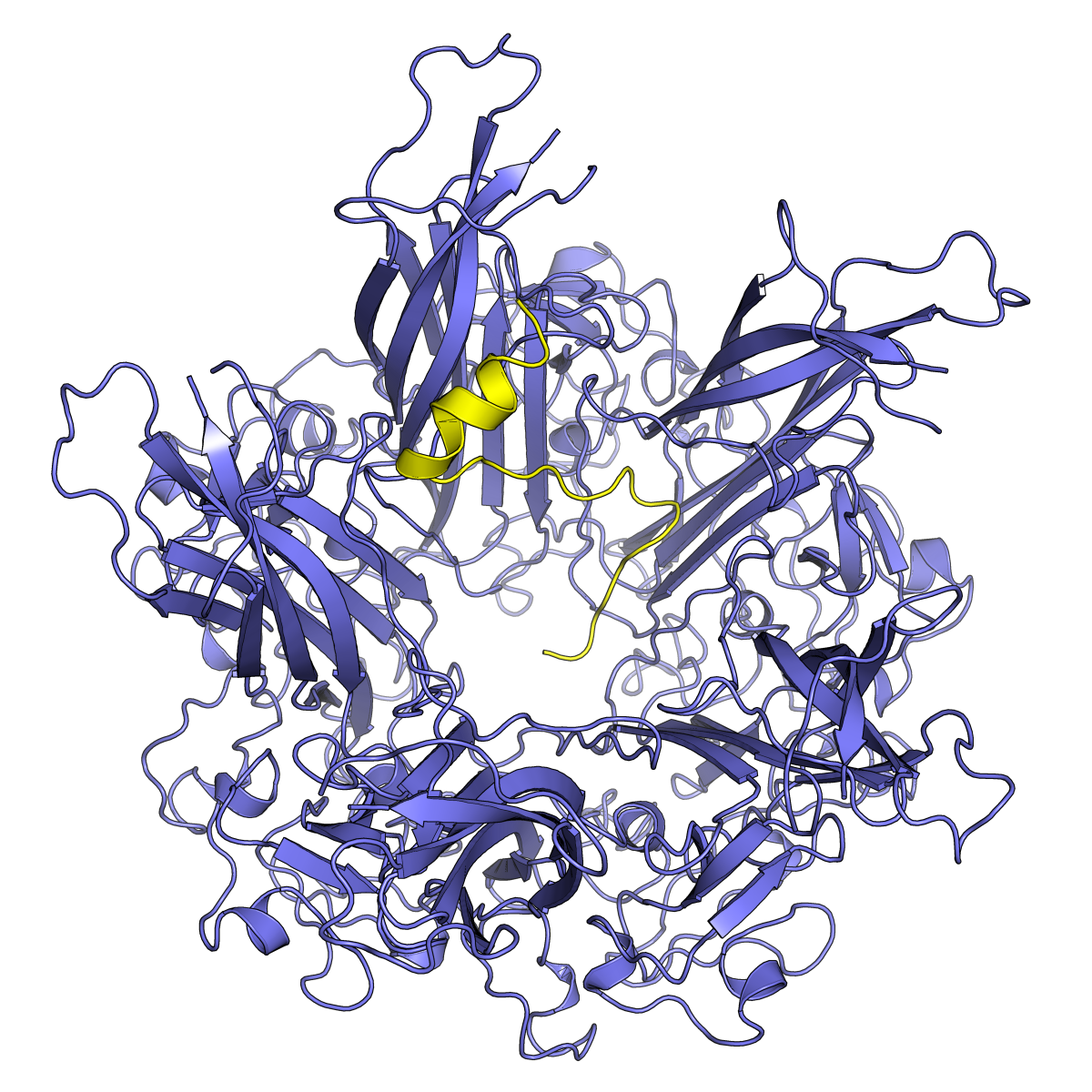
A fragment of the murine polyomavirus VP2 (yellow) in complex with the major capsid protein VP1 (blue). From PDB: 1CN3.

Both VP2 and VP3 are primarily intrinsically unstructured proteins; they have DNA-binding domains and a nuclear localization signal at their C-terminal ends. Both VP2 and VP3 bind to the interior of VP1 pentamers in the assembled capsid. It is generally believed that the stoichiometry of this interaction is one molecule of VP2 or VP3 to each VP1 pentamer, though higher ratios have sometimes been reported, possibly indicating that pentamers can accommodate associations with two minor proteins.

== Function ==
VP2 and VP3 are thought to be involved in facilitating viral entry into the host cell, either by mediating associations with and exit from the endoplasmic reticulum or by facilitating the entry of the viral genome into the cell nucleus. However, the precise mechanism of their involvement is unclear, and may vary among polyomaviruses. In most studies, viral propagation is either reduced or abrogated in the absence of one or both proteins, but the apparent mechanisms vary; for example, in JC virus both VP2 and VP3 seem to be essential for packaging the viral chromosome into the capsid, while absence of these proteins in SV40 prevents successful entry into new host cells, with variable effects on packaging reported. In Merkel cell polyomavirus, the effect of VP2 appears to vary depending on the cell type of the infected cell. In murine polyomavirus the minor proteins have been reported to induce apoptosis in the infected cell, and in SV40 they have been identified as viroporins.

== See also ==
- Viral structural protein
