= Trichodysplasia spinulosa polyomavirus =

Trichodysplasia spinulosa-associated polyomavirus

Virus classification
- (unranked): Virus
- Realm: Floreoviria
- Kingdom: Shotokuvirae
- Phylum: Cossaviricota
- Class: Papovaviricetes
- Order: Sepolyvirales
- Family: Polyomaviridae
- Genus: Alphapolyomavirus
- Species: Alphapolyomavirus octihominis
- Virus: Trichodysplasia spinulosa-associated polyomavirus

Synonyms
- Trichodysplasia spinulosa polyomavirus

Member virus of Human polyomavirus 8

Trichodysplasia spinulosa polyomavirus (also known as Trichodysplasia spinulosa-associated polyomavirus, abbreviated TSPyV or TSV) is a polyomavirus that infects human hosts. First discovered in 2010, TSPyV is associated with Trichodysplasia spinulosa, a rare skin disease only seen in immunocompromised patients. The virus causes hyperproliferation and enlargement of hair follicles by modulating PP2A protein phosphatase signaling pathways. TSPyV was the eighth human polyomavirus to be discovered, and one of four associated with human disease, out of 13 human polyomaviruses known as of the 2015 update to polyomavirus taxonomy released by the International Committee on Taxonomy of Viruses.

== Structure and genome ==
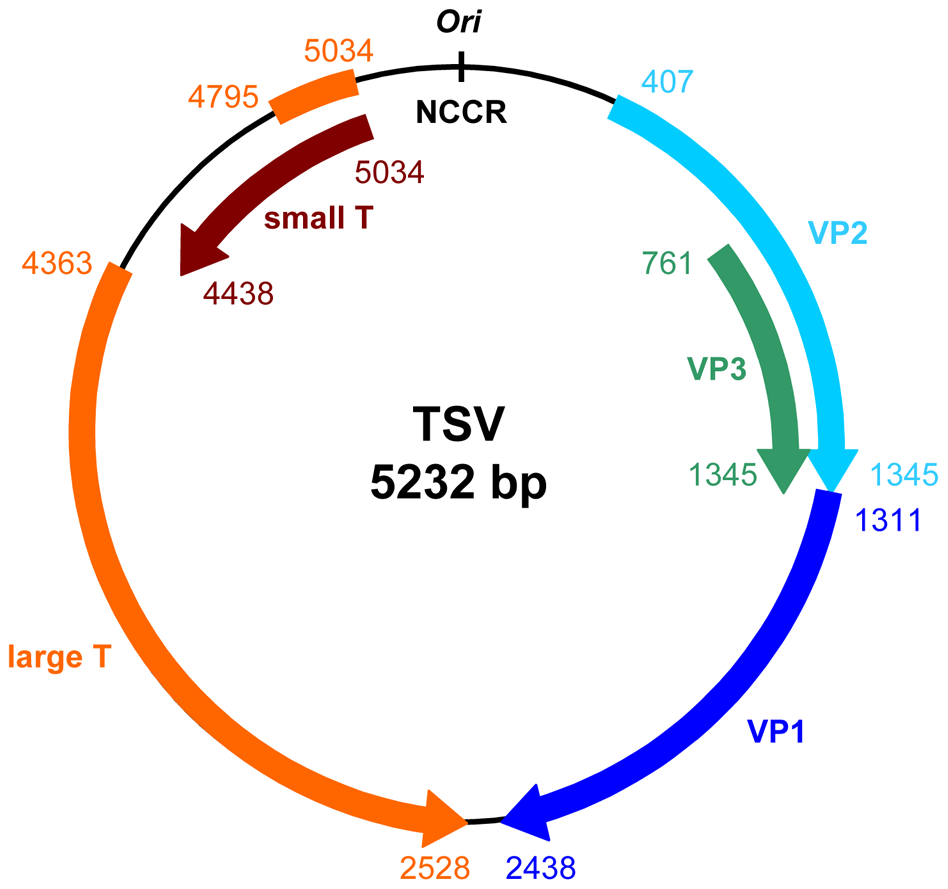
A map of the genome of TSPyV as described at its discovery in 2010. Subsequent work has indicated the possible presence of additional genes.

Like all polyomaviruses, TSPyV has a circular double-stranded DNA genome of around 5.2 kilobases. The genome was originally reported to contain five genes in an organization typical of polyomaviruses, with the small tumor antigen and large tumor antigen genes located in the "early" region of the genome expressed early in the infection cycle, and the viral capsid genes VP1, VP2, and VP3 expressed from the late region. A subsequent study of gene expression during TSPyV infection identified messenger RNA consistent with middle tumor antigen, an early-region protein whose homologs had previously only been reported in polyomaviruses that infect rodents. Middle tumor antigen in mouse and hamster polyomavirus has been closely associated with these viruses' ability to cause tumors. The same study also observed evidence of an additional protein, called tiny T, and of an alternatively spliced form of large tumor antigen known as ALTO.

== Clinical manifestations ==
Trichodysplasia spinulosa is a proliferative skin disorder that occurs in immunocompromised people and is considered benign, but can be disfiguring. It was suspected to be associated with viral infection on the basis of the patient population in which it appeared, and electron microscopy studies of clinical samples identified virus-like particles of a size and shape consistent with a polyomavirus. Unlike Merkel cell carcinoma caused mostly by Merkel cell polyomavirus, trichodysplasia spinulosa is a dysplasia rather than a neoplasia. TSPyV appears to actively replicate in the hair follicle inner root sheath cells; hyperproliferation of these cells is thought to underlie the clinically observable manifestations of the disease. Antiviral drugs such as valganciclovir and cidofovir have shown benefit in treating this disorder in case reports.

== Epidemiology ==
As with most human polyomaviruses, TSPyV is a common asymptomatic infection in healthy adults. Estimates of seroprevalence – that is, prevalence of detectable antibodies against viral proteins – in immunocompetent adults range from 70 to 80% in different sample populations. TSPyV infects the skin, but viral DNA is rarely detectable there in asymptomatic individuals even if they possess antibodies to the virus indicating exposure. TSPyV has been associated with disease only in severely immunocompromised individuals, and then only in a small minority of those in whom the virus is detectable. Individuals with TS symptoms exhibit much higher viral loads than do asymptomatically infected immunocompromised individuals.
