= Middle tumor antigen =

The middle tumor antigen (also called the middle T-antigen and abbreviated MTag or MT) is a protein encoded in the genomes of some polyomaviruses, which are small double-stranded DNA viruses. MTag is expressed early in the infectious cycle along with two other related proteins, the small tumor antigen and large tumor antigen. MTag occurs only in a few known polyomaviruses, while STag and LTag are universal - it was first identified in mouse polyomavirus (MPyV), the first polyomavirus discovered, and also occurs in hamster polyomavirus. In MPyV, MTag is an efficient oncoprotein that can be sufficient to induce neoplastic transformation in some cells.

== Structure and expression ==
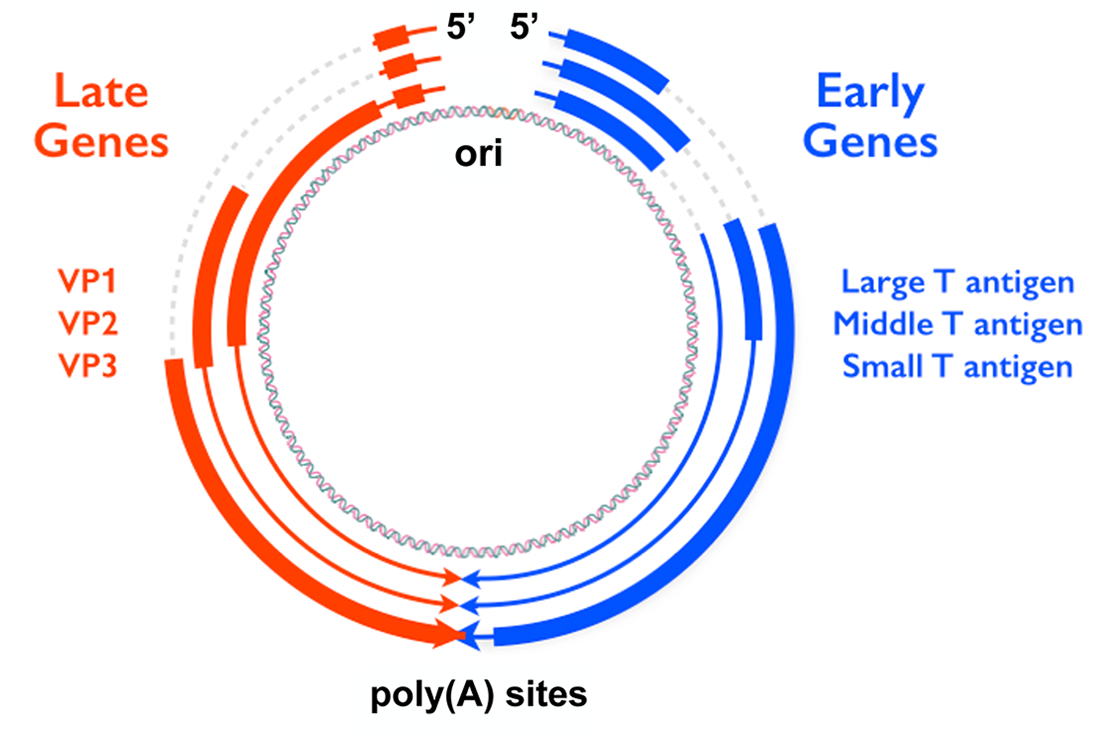
A map of the murine polyomavirus genome, indicating the early genes (LTag, MTag, and STag) at right in blue and the late genes (the viral capsid proteins) at left in red. Each region is transcribed as a single messenger RNA and alternatively spliced to express multiple proteins; the exons are shown as thickened lines.

The genes for the small tumor antigen (STag), middle tumor antigen (MTag), and large tumor antigen (LTag) are encoded in the "early region" of the polyomavirus genome, so named because this region of the genome is expressed early in the infectious process. (The "late region" contains genes encoding the viral capsid proteins.) In MTag-containing polyomaviruses, the early region contains at least three genes encoding STag, MTag, and LTag, and is transcribed as a single messenger RNA processed by alternative splicing. The LTag gene is usually encoded in two exons, of which the first overlaps with the genes for STag and MTag. The result of this genetic encoding is three proteins that share a common N-terminal sequence, forming a protein domain called the J domain which has sequence homology to DnaJ molecular chaperone proteins. MTag and STag share an additional ~100 amino acid residues and have distinct C-termini. The full-length MTag protein is around 420 amino acids long.

Like STag, MTag has no enzymatic activity of its own, but has a number of protein-protein interaction sites that mediate interactions with proteins in the host cell. Particularly in the unique region of its C-terminus, MTag possesses a number of phosphorylation sites. Unlike STag or LTag, the MTag C-terminus contains a membrane anchor sequence that likely forms a transmembrane region. The protein's subcellular localization places it in association with membranes. Immediately prior to the membrane anchor is a proline-rich sequence region where mutations disrupt MTag function, though the mechanism of this disruption is not known.

== Taxonomic distribution ==
MTag occurs only in a few known polyomaviruses, while STag and LTag both appear in all known members of the family. MTag is best studied in the mouse polyomavirus, which was the first polyomavirus discovered and which is a potent oncovirus under certain in vivo conditions. MTag is also well known from the hamster polyomavirus, although the sequence C-terminal to the J domain has little homology between the mouse and hamster viruses. Until recently, these were the only two polyomaviruses known to encode MTag, but in 2015 the genome sequence of a rat polyomavirus was reported to contain MTag as well. This observation is consistent with expectations that it evolved uniquely in the rodent lineage of the polyomavirus family. However, evidence of MTag encoding and expression has also recently been reported in at least one virus of unrelated lineage, the trichodysplasia spinulosa polyomavirus, which is a normally asymptomatic infection in humans that sometimes causes the rare disease trichodysplasia spinulosa in immunocompromised individuals. A somewhat more common tumor antigen variant, an overprinted gene encoding a protein called ALTO, may be evolutionarily related to MTag.

== Function ==
MTag is essential for viral proliferation, though some of its functions overlap with those of STag. Through its J domain, MTag can bind and activate Hsc70, a function shared with the other tumor antigens; however, MTag preferentially performs other protein-protein interactions that compete with the Hsc70 interaction. MTag plays a role in viral DNA replication and in the transition from early to late gene expression, and its absence can cause defects in viral capsid assembly. MTag is also required for viral persistence.

However, MTag's best-studied functions center on its interaction with host cell proteins to activate cellular signaling pathways. Like STag, MTag can bind protein phosphatase 2A (PP2A) through the same physical mechanism, interacting with the A subunit in a way that occludes binding of PP2A B subunits and thus inactivates the enzyme. This interaction is required for the formation of other MTag-host cell protein complexes; however, PP2A catalytic activity is not required. For example, MTag binds and activates Src-family protein tyrosine kinases in a PP2A-dependent manner, and in turn is phosphorylated by Src on tyrosine residues in the MTag C-terminus. Preference for members of the Src family varies, with mouse and hamster polyomavirus MTags having different distributions. Once phosphorylated, MTag interacts with and activates downstream signaling pathways through Shc, 14-3-3 proteins, phosphoinositide 3-kinase, and phospholipase Cγ1. The signaling functions of the phosphorylated MTag have been described as behaving like a mimic of a constitutively active receptor tyrosine kinase.

Studies of MTag have often concentrated on its role in cellular transformation more than its natural role in the life cycles of the polyomaviruses in which it occurs. One hypothesis for the evolutionary role of MTag relies on the observation that MPyV LTag lacks an apparent ability to bind the host cell tumor suppressor protein p53, which interacts with the LTag proteins of other polyomaviruses such as SV40. The function of MTag is thus hypothesized to indirectly replace this lost interaction.

== Cellular transformation ==
MTag's most distinctive property is its efficiency as an oncoprotein. It has the ability to induce neoplastic transformation in a variety of cell types and can immortalize cells in culture. Its effectiveness in transformation is thought to be somewhat epiphenomenal to its role in the typical lytic viral life cycle. The transformation capacity of MTag can be eliminated by mutations that remove the membrane anchor, and reduced or eliminated by mutations in the phosphorylated tyrosines and the proline-rich region.

=== Use in research ===
Because of its high efficiency as an oncovirus, particularly in newborn or immunodeficient mice, mouse polyomavirus has served as a productive mechanism for modeling tumorigenesis. Because most of that efficiency is due to MTag, the protein alone has also been extensively used to induce tumors in animal models. Transgenically expressed MTag is used in the widely studied MMTV-PyMT mouse model of breast cancer.

== See also ==
- List of proteins
