= Alphapolyomavirus =

- Alphapolyomavirus model with a non-enveloped capsid and a T = 7d icosahedral symmetry at a 50 nm diameter scale

Virus classification
- (unranked): Virus
- Realm: Monodnaviria
- Kingdom: Shotokuvirae
- Phylum: Cossaviricota
- Class: Papovaviricetes
- Order: Sepolyvirales
- Family: Polyomaviridae
- Genus: Alphapolyomavirus

Genus of virus

Alphapolyomavirus is one of eight genera of non-enveloped dsDNA viruses in the Polyomaviridae family. Member viruses primarily infect humans and other mammals. Transmission of the virus in humans is primarily spread via direct contact with parents or other high-contact individuals as children.

The primary alphapolyomavirus that is of clinical significance to humans is Merkel cell polyomavirus (Human polyomavirus 5, MCV, or MCPyV). The apparent oncogenicity of MCPyV similar to other cancer-causing viruses such as HPV, Epstein–Barr virus, and Hepatitis C virus is a main area of research for the scientific community.

== Species ==
The genus contains the following species, listed by scientific name and followed by the exemplar virus of the species:

- Alphapolyomavirus acelebensis, Bat polyomavirus 5b2
- Alphapolyomavirus aflavicollis, Apodemus flavicollis polyomavirus 1
- Alphapolyomavirus apaniscus, Ateles paniscus polyomavirus 1
- Alphapolyomavirus callosciuri, Callosciurus erythraeus polyomavirus 1
- Alphapolyomavirus cardiodermae, Cardioderma polyomavirus
- Alphapolyomavirus carolliae, Bat polyomavirus 4b
- Alphapolyomavirus castoris, Castor fiber polyomavirus 1
- Alphapolyomavirus chlopygerythrus, Vervet monkey polyomavirus 1
- Alphapolyomavirus dobsoniae, Bat polyomavirus 5a
- Alphapolyomavirus eidoli, Eidolon polyomavirus 1
- Alphapolyomavirus epserotini, Eptesicus serotinus polyomavirus 1
- Alphapolyomavirus gorillae, Gorilla gorilla gorilla polyomavirus 1
- Alphapolyomavirus macacae, Macaca fascicularis polyomavirus 1
- Alphapolyomavirus mauratus, Hamster polyomavirus
- Alphapolyomavirus mischreibersii, Miniopterus schreibersii polyomavirus 1
- Alphapolyomavirus molossi, Bat polyomavirus 3b
- Alphapolyomavirus muris, Mouse polyomavirus
- Alphapolyomavirus myodaubentonii, Myotis daubentonii polyomavirus 2
- Alphapolyomavirus nonihominis, Human polyomavirus 9
- Alphapolyomavirus octihominis, Trichodysplasia spinulosa-associated polyomavirus
- Alphapolyomavirus omartiensseni, Otomops polyomavirus 1
- Alphapolyomavirus pacynocephalus, Yellow baboon polyomavirus 1
- Alphapolyomavirus panos, Chimpanzee polyomavirus
- Alphapolyomavirus philantombae, Philantomba monticola polyomavirus 1
- Alphapolyomavirus pibadius, Piliocolobus badius polyomavirus 2
- Alphapolyomavirus pirufomitratus, Piliocolobus rufomitratus polyomavirus 1
- Alphapolyomavirus ponabelii, Sumatran orang-utan polyomavirus
- Alphapolyomavirus ponpygmaeus, Bornean orang-utan polyomavirus
- Alphapolyomavirus procyonis, Raccoon polyomavirus
- Alphapolyomavirus ptevampyrus, Bat polyomavirus 5b1
- Alphapolyomavirus quardecihominis, LI polyomavirus
- Alphapolyomavirus quartipanos, Pan troglodytes verus polyomavirus 3
- Alphapolyomavirus quintihominis, Merkel cell polyomavirus
- Alphapolyomavirus quintipanos, Pan troglodytes verus polyomavirus 4
- Alphapolyomavirus ranorvegicus, Rattus norvegicus polyomavirus 1
- Alphapolyomavirus saraneus, Sorex araneus polyomavirus 1
- Alphapolyomavirus secarplanirostris, Bat polyomavirus 3a
- Alphapolyomavirus secomartiensseni, Otomops polyomavirus 2
- Alphapolyomavirus secumastomysis, Mastomys natalensis polyomavirus 2
- Alphapolyomavirus secumischreibersii, Miniopterus schreibersii polyomavirus 2
- Alphapolyomavirus secupanos, Pan troglodytes verus polyomavirus 1a
- Alphapolyomavirus septipanos, Pan troglodytes schweinfurthii polyomavirus 2
- Alphapolyomavirus sextipanos, Pan troglodytes verus polyomavirus 5
- Alphapolyomavirus socoronatus, Sorex coronatus polyomavirus 1
- Alphapolyomavirus sominutus, Sorex minutus polyomavirus 1
- Alphapolyomavirus sturnirae, Bat polyomavirus 3a-B0454
- Alphapolyomavirus suis, Sus scrofa polyomavirus 1
- Alphapolyomavirus terdecihominis, New Jersey polyomavirus
- Alphapolyomavirus tertarplanisrostris, Bat polyomavirus 4a
- Alphapolyomavirus tertichlopygerythrus, Vervet monkey polyomavirus 3
- Alphapolyomavirus tertimastomysis, Mastomys natalensis polyomavirus 3
- Alphapolyomavirus tertipanos, Pan troglodytes verus polyomavirus 2a
- Alphapolyomavirus tubelangeri, Tupaia belangeri polyomavirus
- Alphapolyomavirus tuglis, Tupaia glis polyomavirus 1
