= Ludwik Gross =

Polish-American virologist (1904–1999)

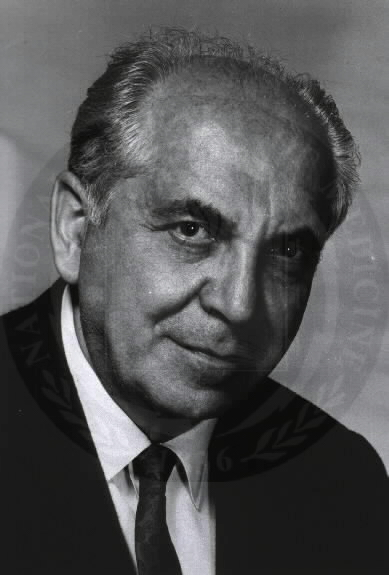
- Ludwik Gross
- Born: 11 September 1904; Kraków, Poland
- Died: July 19, 1999 (aged 94); New York City, United States
- Education: University of Cracow, Institut Pasteur, Sloan Kettering Memorial Cancer Center, Mount Sinai School of Medicine
- Occupations: oncologist virologist
- Known for: murine leukemia virus polyomavirus

Ludwik Gross (September 11, 1904 – July 19, 1999) was a Polish-American virologist who discovered two different tumor viruses—murine leukemia virus and mouse polyomavirus—capable of causing cancers in laboratory mice.

== Biography ==
Gross was born on September 11, 1904, in Kraków, Poland to a prominent Jewish family. He studied for a degree in medicine at the Jagiellonian University. He escaped from occupied Poland in 1940 soon after the 1939 Nazi invasion and travelled to the United States, ultimately serving in the United States Armed Forces during World War II.

After the war, he joined other scientists (notably Rosalyn Yalow, recipient of the 1977 Nobel Prize in Medicine or Physiology) in the "Golden Age" of research at the Bronx Veterans Administration Medical Center, becoming director of the Cancer Research Division. One story claims that this appointment allowed him to move his research mice from the trunk of his car, where he had been carrying out studies, into a fully equipped laboratory.

Gross was also a medical journalist and frequent letter writer to The New York Times. In one letter, he opposed fluoridation of the water supply to prevent tooth decay, calling fluoride "an insidious poison, harmful, toxic and cumulative in its effect, even when ingested in minimal amounts." He never changed his view.

He died at Montefiore Medical Center on July 19, 1999, of stomach cancer at age 94.

== Research work ==
Gross was a major proponent of the possibility that some cancers could be caused by viruses, and began a long search for viral causes of murine leukemia. In the course of these studies, he isolated the Gross murine leukemia virus strain, as well as the first polyomavirus (so named for its proclivity to cause cancers in multiple tissue types). Gross murine leukemia virus is a retrovirus whose human counterpart is T cell lymphotropic virus I, while murine polyomavirus is closely related to the human Merkel cell polyomavirus that causes most forms of Merkel cell carcinoma. Thus, Gross identified two critical animal viruses that serve as models for viruses causing cancer in humans. His encyclopedic textbook Oncogenic Viruses is still considered a leading source book for early work in the discovery of cancer-causing viruses.

Gross died of stomach cancer, a major cancer caused by infection with the Helicobacter pylori, which he himself researched. A collection of his personal papers is held at the National Library of Medicine in Bethesda, Maryland.

== Scientific awards ==
- R.R. de Villiers Foundation (Leukemia Society) Award for Leukemia Research (1953)
- Walker Prize of the Royal College of Surgeons of England in London (1961)
- Pasteur Silver Medal of the Pasteur Institute in Paris (1962)
- WHO United Nations Prize for Cancer Research (1962)
- Bertner Foundation Award (1963)
- Special Virus Cancer Program Award of the National Cancer Institute (1972)
- Albert Lasker Award for Basic Medical Research (1974)
- William B. Coley Award (1975)
- Principal 1978 Paul Ehrlich-Ludwig Darmstaeder Prize in Frankfurt
- Griffuel Prize in Paris (1978)
- Elected to the National Academy of Sciences (1973)
- French Legion of Honor (1977)
