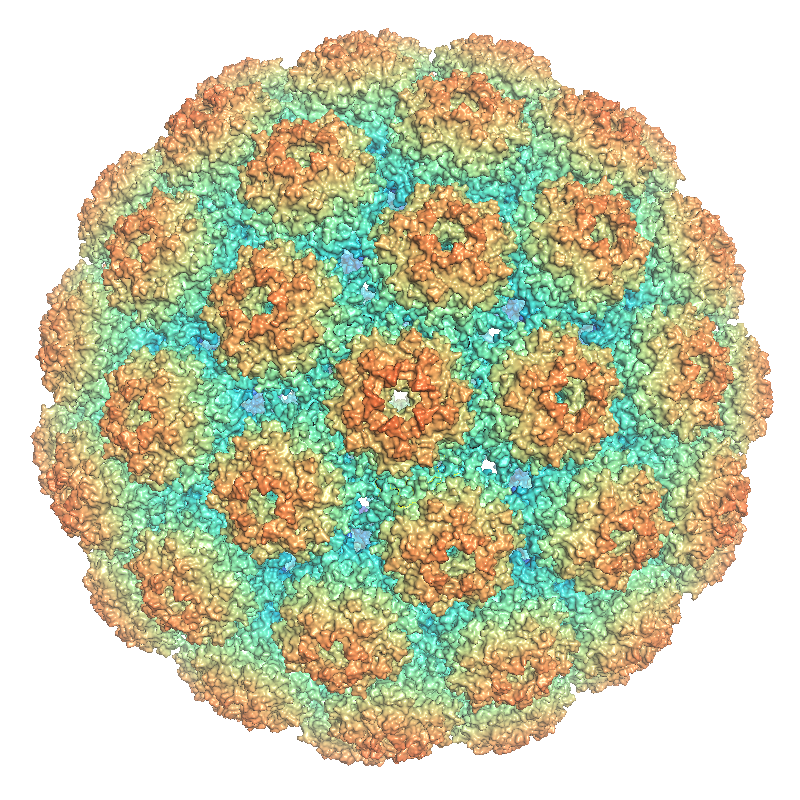
- The capsid protein VP1 assembled into an icosahedral capsid structure comprising 72 pentamers, colored by distance from the interior center. From PDB: 1SIE.

Virus classification
- (unranked): Virus
- Realm: Monodnaviria
- Kingdom: Shotokuvirae
- Phylum: Cossaviricota
- Class: Papovaviricetes
- Order: Sepolyvirales
- Family: Polyomaviridae
- Genus: Alphapolyomavirus
- Species: Alphapolyomavirus muris

Synonyms
- Mus musculus polyomavirus 1

= Murine polyomavirus =

Mouse polyomavirus

Species of virus

Murine polyomavirus (also known as mouse polyomavirus, Polyomavirus muris, or Mus musculus polyomavirus 1, and in older literature as SE polyoma or parotid tumor virus; abbreviated MPyV) is an unenveloped double-stranded DNA virus of the polyomavirus family. The first member of the family discovered, it was originally identified by accident in the 1950s. A component of mouse leukemia extract capable of causing tumors, particularly in the parotid gland, in newborn mice was reported by Ludwik Gross in 1953 and identified as a virus by Sarah Stewart and Bernice Eddy at the National Cancer Institute, after whom it was once called "SE polyoma". Stewart and Eddy would go on to study related polyomaviruses such as SV40 that infect primates, including humans. These discoveries were widely reported at the time and formed the early stages of understanding of oncoviruses.

== Pathology ==
MPyV is primarily spread among mice via the intranasal route and is shed in urine. Genetic susceptibility to MPyV infection among mice varies significantly, and not all MPyV strains are oncogenic. In general, only newborns and immunosuppressed mice (usually transgenic) develop tumors upon infection; although originally observed as a cause of parotid gland tumors, the virus may induce solid tumors in a wide variety of tissue types of both epithelial and mesenchymal origin. Although viruses in circulation among feral mice can be tumorigenic, under natural conditions the virus does not cause tumors; maternal antibodies have been shown to be critical in protecting neonates. It has been described as rare in modern laboratory mouse research colonies.

MPyV is also capable of infecting and causing tumors in other rodent species, including guinea pigs, hamsters, and rats, though the diversity of tissue types giving rise to tumors is reduced in these species. MPyV does not infect humans and is not associated with human cancers.

== Structure ==
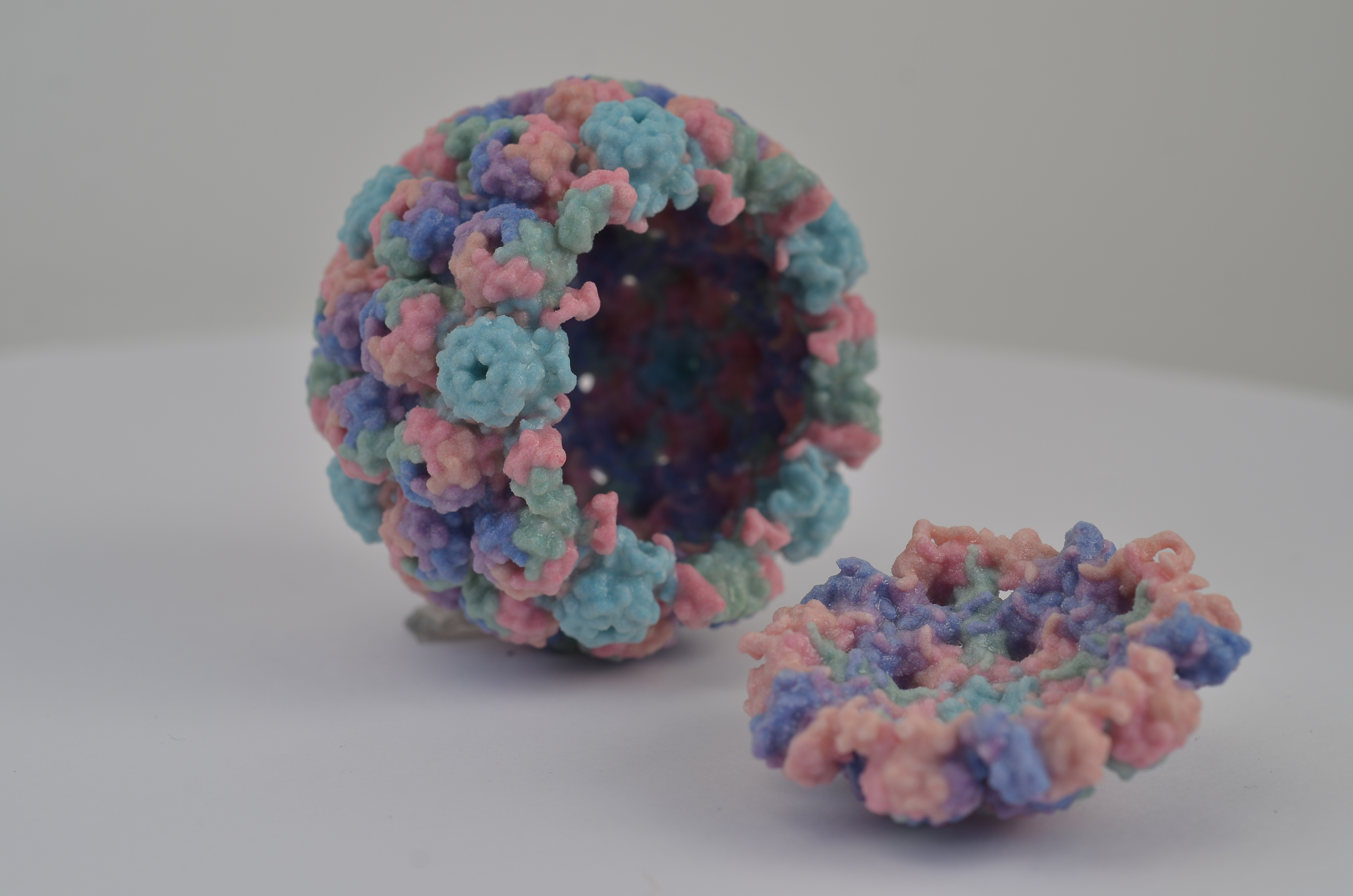
A 3D printed model of a polyomavirus capsid.

Like other members of the polyomavirus family, MPyV has an unenveloped icosahedral (T=7) viral capsid around 45 nanometers in diameter. The capsid contains three proteins; capsid protein VP1 is the primary component and self-assembles into a 360-unit outer capsid layer composed of 72 pentamers. The other two components, VP2 and VP3, have high sequence similarity to each other, with VP3 truncated at the N-terminus relative to VP2. VP2 and VP3 assemble inside the capsid in contact with VP1.

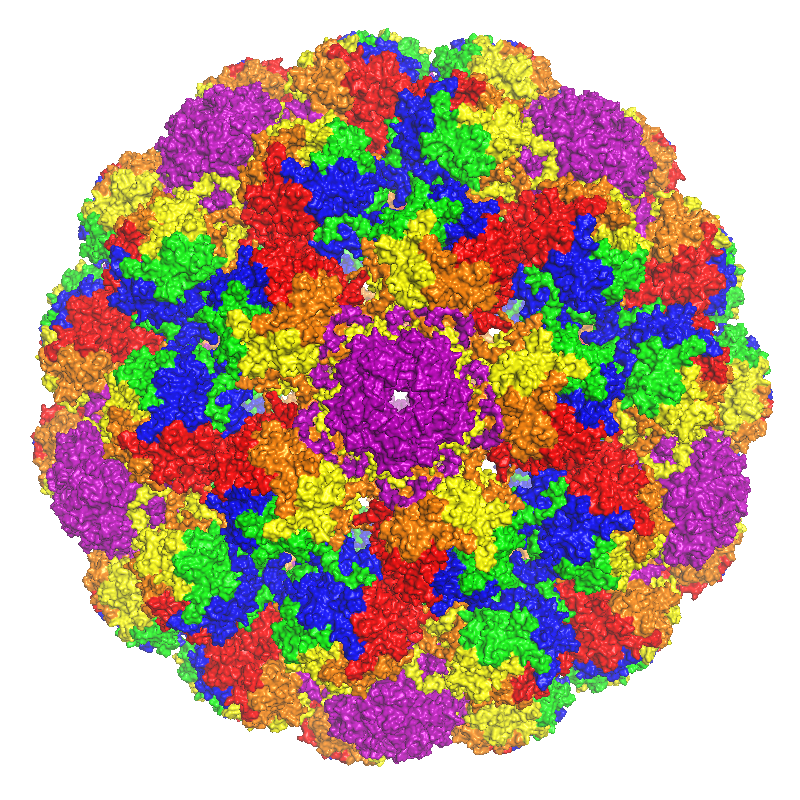
A capsid structure colored to illustrate the assembly of the icosahedral architecture from VP1 pentamers. Each symmetry-related VP1 monomer is shown in a different color. From PDB: 1SIE.

VP1 is capable of self-assembly into virus-like particles even in the absence of other viral components. This process requires bound calcium ions and the resulting particles are stabilized by, but do not require, intra-pentamer disulfide bonds.

== Genome ==
MPyV has a closed, circular double-stranded DNA genome of around 5 kilo-base pairs. It contains two transcriptional units located on opposite strands, called the "early region" and "late region" for the stage in the viral life cycle in which they are expressed; each region produces a pre-messenger RNA molecule from which six genes are expressed through alternative splicing. The three genes in the early region express the large, middle, and small tumor antigens (LT, MT, ST) and are sufficient for inducing tumors. The three genes in the late region express the three capsid proteins VP1, VP2, and VP3. Between the early and late regions is a region of noncoding DNA containing the origin of replication and promoter and enhancer elements. Expression of a microRNA from a region overlapping one of the LT exons has also been identified and is thought to be involved in downregulating expression of the tumor antigens.

== Replication ==
=== Cellular entry ===
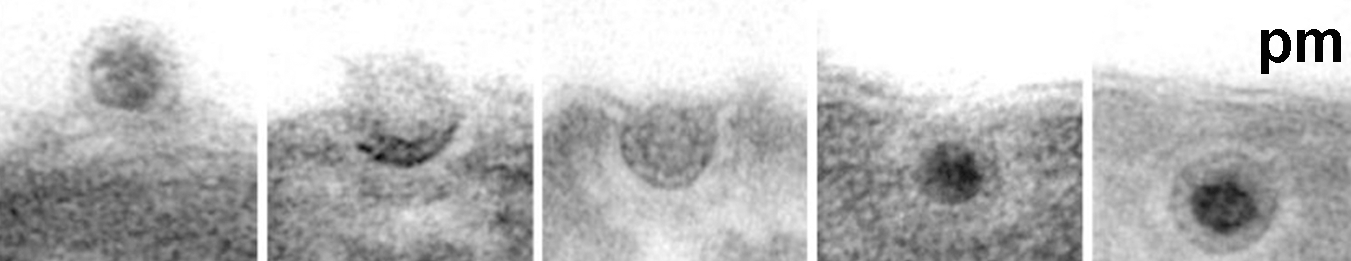
A series of thawed cryosections of cells infected with MPyV illustrating the process of viral internalization. "pm" notation indicates the position of the plasma membrane.

Viruses lacking a viral envelope often have complex mechanisms for entry into the host cell. MPyV capsid protein VP1 binds to sialic acids of gangliosides GD1a and GT1b on the cell surface. The functions of VP2 and VP3 are less well understood, but at least VP2 has been reported to be exposed upon endocytosis of the viral particle and may be involved in releasing the virus from the endoplasmic reticulum. MPyV has been reported to enter cells through both a caveolae-dependent endocytosis mechanism and by an independent mechanism through uncoated vesicles.

Unlike many viruses that enter the cell through endocytosis, polyomaviruses penetrate the cell membrane and enter the cytosol from the late endoplasmic reticulum rather than from endosomes, although conformational changes in response to low pH in endolysosomes have been hypothesized as critical steps in the process. MPyV membrane exit is believed to depend on the presence of specific host proteins located in the late ER; for example, the host protein ERp29, a member of the protein disulfide isomerase family, has been shown to disrupt the conformation of VP1. It is not known whether entry into the cytosol is obligatory for MPyV infection or whether the particle could enter the cell nucleus directly from the ER. Even a single viral particle entering the nucleus can be sufficient for infection.

=== Virion assembly ===
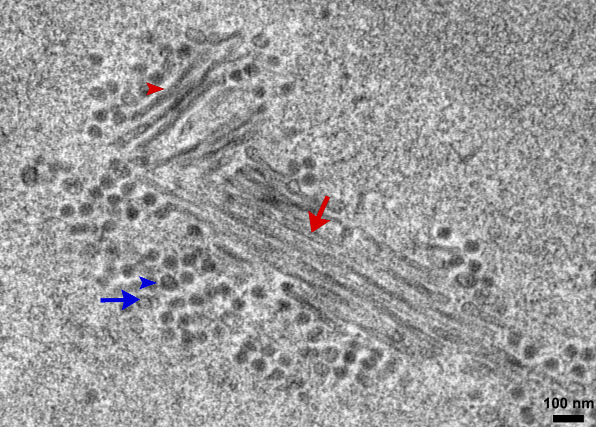
Micrograph of a thin section of a cell infected with MPyV illustrating the structure of the virus factories in which new virions are produced. Red indicators point to tubular structures (arrow: empty tubule; arrowhead: filled tubule) and blue indicators point to virions (arrow: empty virion; arrowhead: filled virion). The dense center of the filled structures likely indicates the presence of virus genomic DNA.

New MPyV virions are assembled in the nucleus in dense local aggregations known as virus factories. Capsid proteins, produced in the cytoplasm of the host cell, enter the nucleus as assembled capsomers consisting of pentameric VP1 associated with VP2 or VP3. Nuclear localization sequences consistent with karyopherin interactions have been identified in capsid protein sequences, facilitating their transit through nuclear pores. Once inside the nucleus they assemble into mature capsids containing a copy of the viral genome, although the exact mechanism of encapsidation is not well understood. Filamentous or tubular structures representing polymerized VP1 have been observed in the nuclei of infected cells as intermediates in the assembly process from which mature virions are produced.

== Tumorigenesis ==
MPyV contains three proteins extensively studied for their ability to induce neoplastic transformation (that is, carcinogenesis); these proteins are expressed from the early region of the viral genome and are known as large, middle, and small tumor antigen. Murine polyomavirus and its close relative hamster polyomavirus are historically the only two known viruses whose genomes contain middle tumor antigen, by far the most efficient of the three early proteins at inducing carcinogenesis. In 2015 the genome sequence of a rat polyomavirus was reported to contain middle tumor antigen as well, consistent with expectations that it evolved uniquely in the rodent lineage of the polyomavirus family. Expression of MT from a transgene or introduction in cell culture can be sufficient to induce transformation. Studies using MT have played key roles in understanding host-cell oncogenes and their effects on carcinogenesis, particularly in the study of the Src family of tyrosine kinases. Transgenic mice expressing MT are widely used as models for cancer progression and metastasis, particularly of breast cancer.

== Taxonomy ==
In the 2015 taxonomic update to the polyomavirus group, the International Committee on Taxonomy of Viruses classified MPyV as the type species of the genus Alphapolyomavirus under its new official name Mus musculus polyomavirus 1. The species was renamed Alphapolyomavirus muris in 2022.
