= Small tumor antigen =

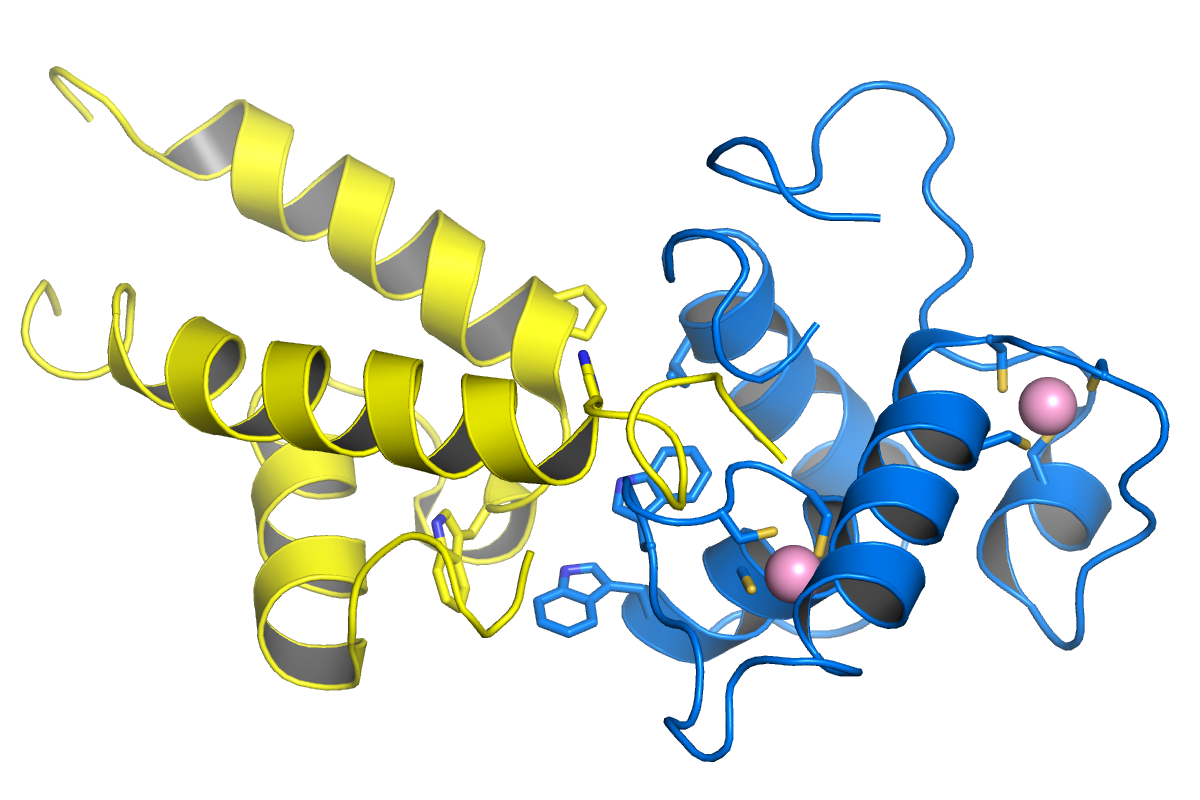
The structure of part of the small tumor antigen from the SV40 polyomavirus, showing the J domain in yellow and the STag unique region in blue. Bound zinc ions are shown as pink spheres. Coordinating cysteine residues and residues in the domain interface are shown as sticks.

The small tumor antigen (also called the small T-antigen and abbreviated STag or ST) is a protein encoded in the genomes of polyomaviruses, which are small double-stranded DNA viruses. STag is expressed early in the infectious cycle and is usually not essential for viral proliferation, though in most polyomaviruses it does improve replication efficiency. The STag protein is expressed from a gene that overlaps the large tumor antigen (LTag) such that the two proteins share an N-terminal DnaJ-like domain but have distinct C-terminal regions. STag is known to interact with host cell proteins, most notably protein phosphatase 2A (PP2A), and may activate the expression of cellular proteins associated with the cell cycle transition to S phase. In some polyomaviruses - such as the well-studied SV40, which natively infects monkeys - STag is unable to induce neoplastic transformation in the host cell on its own, but its presence may increase the transforming efficiency of LTag. In other polyomaviruses, such as Merkel cell polyomavirus, which causes Merkel cell carcinoma in humans, STag appears to be important for replication and to be an oncoprotein in its own right.

== Structure and expression ==
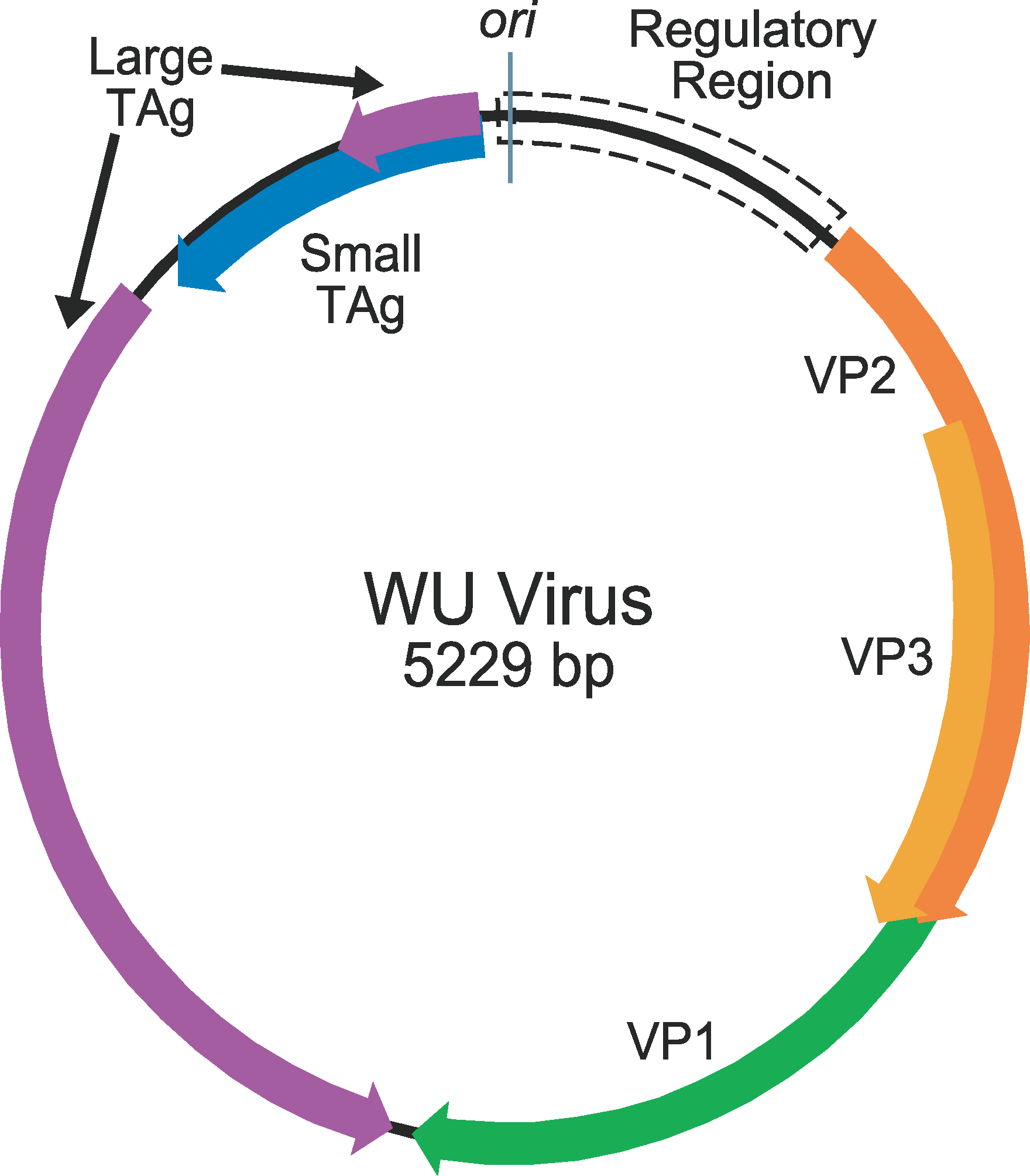
Genome structure of WU virus, a typical human polyomavirus. The early genes are at left, comprising LTag (purple) and STag (blue); the late genes are at right, and the origin of replication is shown at the top of the figure.

The genes for both the small and the large tumor antigen are encoded in the "early region" of the polyomavirus genome, so named because this region of the genome is expressed early in the infectious process. (The "late region" contains genes encoding the viral capsid proteins.) The early region typically contains at least two genes and is transcribed as a single messenger RNA processed by alternative splicing. The LTag gene is usually encoded in two exons, of which the first overlaps with the gene for STag (and sometimes other tumor antigens as well, such as the murine polyomavirus middle tumor antigen). Polyomavirus STag proteins are usually around 170-200 residues long and consist of two distinct regions as a result of this genetic encoding. STag and LTag share a common N-terminal domain called the J domain, which is around 80-90 residues long, has homology to DnaJ proteins, and functions as a molecular chaperone.

The C-terminal portion of the STag protein is distinct from LTag but shares an additional ~100 residues with middle tumor antigen in those viruses that express it, such as murine polyomavirus. The C-terminal region of STag contains a protein phosphatase 2A binding region, followed in mammalian polyomaviruses by a metal ion binding region at the C-terminus with conserved cysteine-containing sequence motifs. These are believed to bind zinc in the SV40 STag and confer improved protein stability, but in Merkel cell polyomavirus STag, they have been reported to bind iron-sulfur clusters. Among polyomaviruses that infect birds - classified in the genus Gammapolyomavirus - the conserved cysteines characterizing these metal-binding regions are not present and there is no detectable sequence homology between the avian and mammalian STag C-termini.

== Function ==
The exact functional role of STag varies among polyomaviruses. In SV40 and JC virus, STag is not required for viral proliferation, but does improve efficiency. In SV40, STag has a similar role in cellular transformation. In Merkel cell polyomavirus, it appears to play a significant role in oncogenesis, a function performed primarily by LTag in other polyomaviruses. Where the tumor antigens' subcellular localization has been characterized, STag is usually located in the cytoplasm.

=== Viral replication ===
In most well-studied polyomaviruses, STag improves the efficiency of viral proliferation but is not essential. SV40 and murine polyomavirus STags appear to have a role in promoting host cell expression of genes under the control of certain types of promoters. This function is mediated by the J domain, presumably indirectly as STag has no DNA-binding ability of its own. Both STag and LTag interact through their J domains with Hsc70 to increase its ATPase activity.

=== Effects on the cell cycle ===
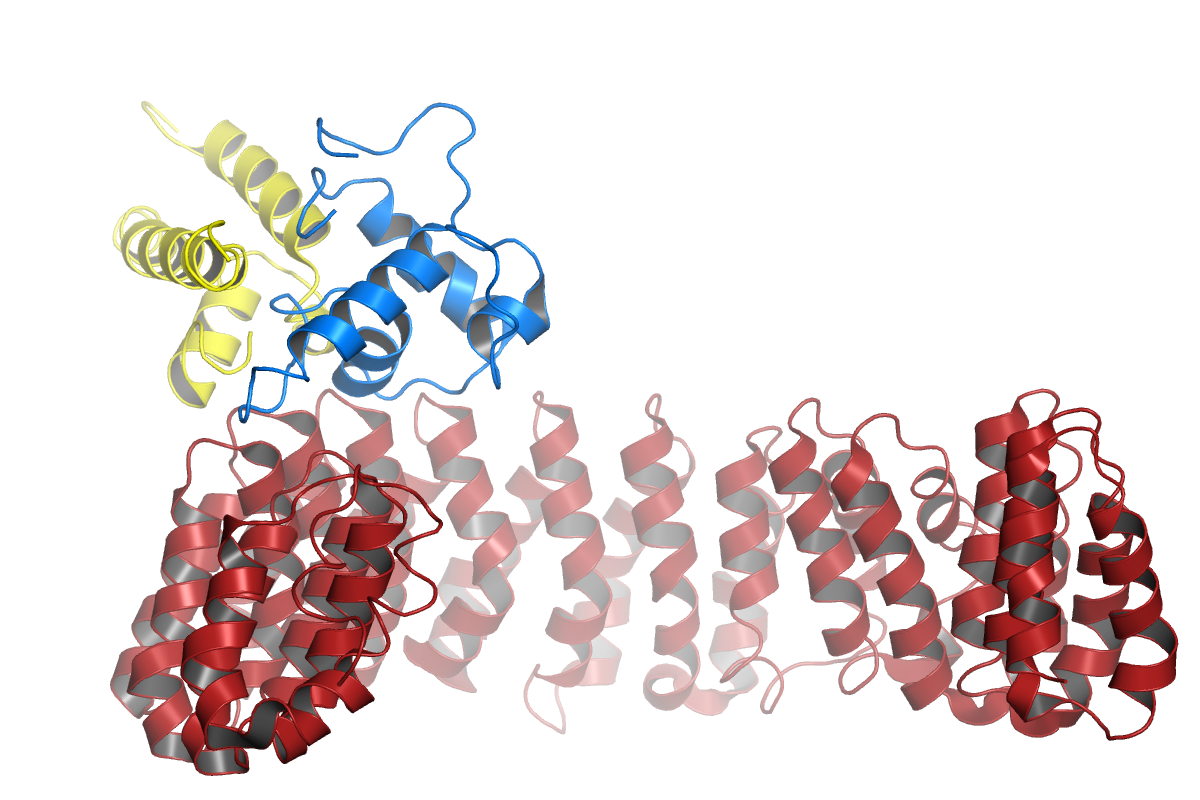
The SV40 polyomavirus small tumor antigen (STag) J domain (yellow) and unique region (blue) in complex with the human protein phosphatase 2A (PP2A) A subunit (red).

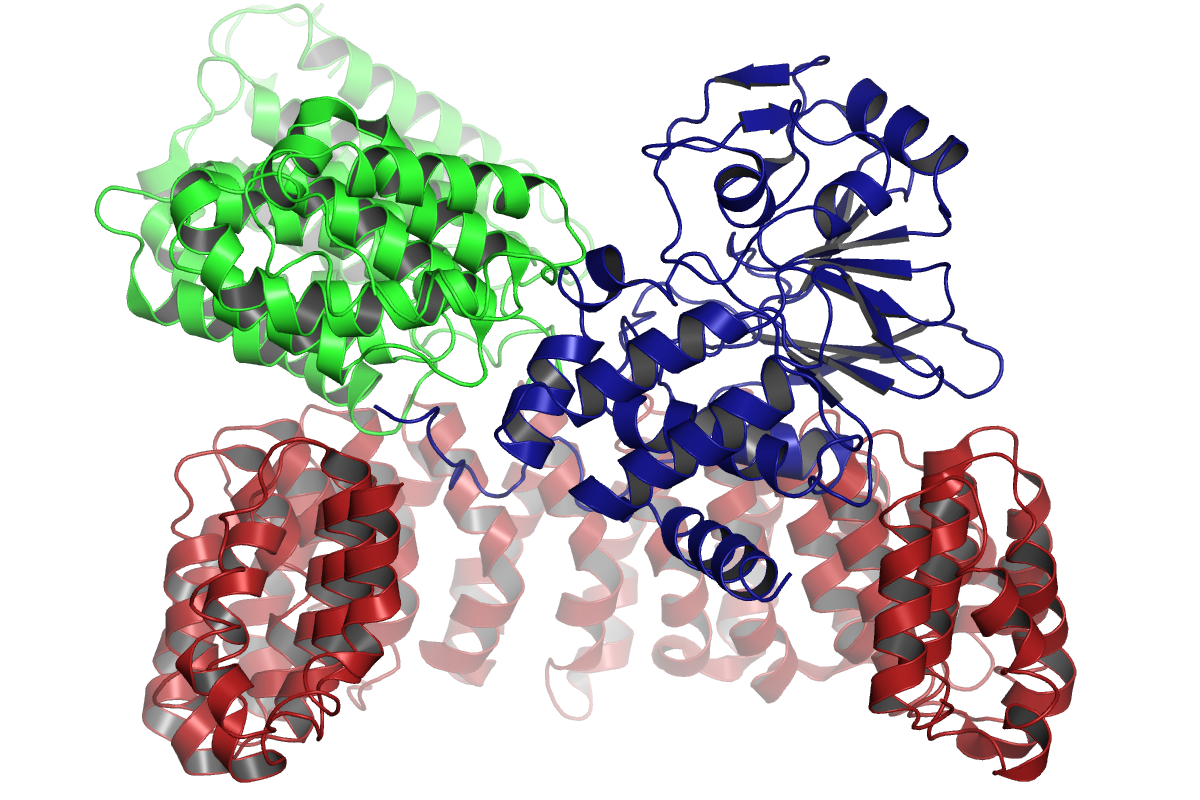
The human protein phosphatase 2A (PP2A) heterotrimeric complex, shown with the regulatory subunit A (red), regulatory subunit B56 (green), and catalytic subunit (dark blue). The overlap between the STag and B56 binding sites on the A subunit is clear.

Because polyomavirus genome replication relies on the DNA replication machinery of the host cell, the cell must be in S phase (the part of the cell cycle in which the host cell's genome is normally replicated) in order to provide the necessary molecular machinery for viral DNA replication. Viral proteins therefore promote dysregulation of the cell cycle and entry into S phase. This function is usually primarily provided by LTag through its interactions with retinoblastoma protein and p53.

STag contributes to this process through its interaction with protein phosphatase 2A (PP2A). The active form of PP2A consists of a heterotrimer assembly of three subunits. X-ray crystallography of the STag-PP2A protein complex demonstrates that STag replaces one subunit in the complex, thereby inactivating it.

=== Cellular transformation ===
Some, but not all, polyomaviruses are oncoviruses capable of inducing neoplastic transformation in some cells. In oncogenic polyomaviruses, the tumor antigens are responsible for the transformation activity, although the exact molecular mechanisms vary from one virus to another. STag is usually not capable of inducing these effects on its own, but increases efficiency of transformation or is sometimes a required component in addition to LTag. In most polyomaviruses, STag's effect on transformation is mediated through its interaction with PP2A.

=== Distinct functions in Merkel cell polyomavirus ===
Merkel cell polyomavirus (MCPyV) is a virus causally associated with a rare and aggressive human skin cancer called Merkel cell carcinoma. MCPyV genetic material is often found integrated into the tumor cell genome, usually with mutations in the tumor antigen genes that abrogate the helicase activity of LTag, which is required for normal viral replication. In MCPyV, STag, rather than LTag, is the primary oncoprotein, is found in Merkel cell carcinomas more often than LTag, is required for tumor growth, and has additional pro-transformation effects independent of its PP2A-binding activity. MCPyV STag is believed to induce dysregulation of cap-dependent translation by promoting phosphorylation of eukaryotic translation initiation factor 4E-BP1. In vivo studies in rodent animal models suggest that MCPyV STag alone can be sufficient to drive transformation.
