= Large tumor antigen =

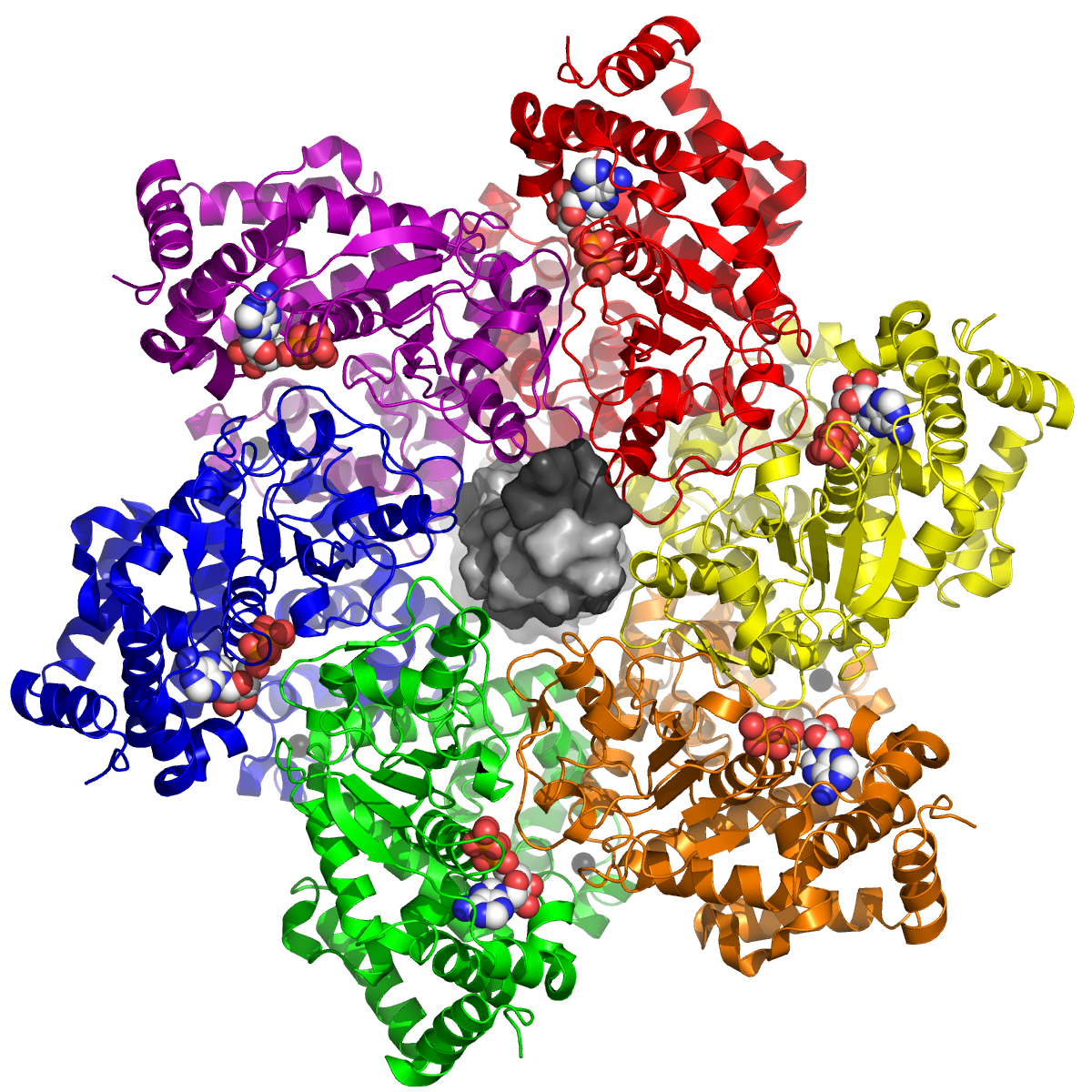
The zinc-binding and ATPase/helicase domains of the large tumor antigen in hexameric form, shown with bound ADP (white), zinc (black spheres), and double-stranded DNA (center, light and dark gray).

The large tumor antigen (also called the large T-antigen and abbreviated LTag or LT) is a protein encoded in the genomes of polyomaviruses, which are small double-stranded DNA viruses. LTag is expressed early in the infectious cycle and is essential for viral proliferation. Containing four well-conserved protein domains as well as several intrinsically disordered regions, LTag is a fairly large multifunctional protein; in most polyomaviruses, it ranges from around 600-800 amino acids in length. LTag has two primary functions, both related to replication of the viral genome: it unwinds the virus's DNA to prepare it for replication, and it interacts with proteins in the host cell to dysregulate the cell cycle so that the host's DNA replication machinery can be used to replicate the virus's genome. Some polyomavirus LTag proteins - most notably the well-studied SV40 large tumor antigen from the SV40 virus - are oncoproteins that can induce neoplastic transformation in the host cell.

== Domain structure ==
Polyomavirus LTag proteins contain four well-conserved, globular protein domains: from N- to C-terminus, these are the J domain, the origin-binding domain (OBD), the zinc-binding domain, and the AAA+ ATPase domain. The domains are linked by intrinsically disordered regions, which are themselves often functionally important and whose length varies among polyomaviruses; both the folded globular domains and the disordered regions form protein-protein interactions with a number of host cell proteins. Some LTag homologs also have a disordered C-terminal tail called the host range domain, which can be phosphorylated and in some strains is essential, although the molecular mechanism of its essentiality is unclear.

In some polyomaviruses, truncated variants of the LTag protein are produced through alternative splicing that do not include the helicase (zinc-binding and ATPase) components. These truncated LTags retain their ability to interact with some cell cycle regulatory proteins and are involved in cell transformation but not in viral genome replication.

=== J domain ===
The J domain is a DnaJ molecular chaperone that is required for viral genome replication in vivo (but is dispensable in cell-free laboratory experiments). The J domain interacts with Hsc70 heat-shock proteins. In many polyomavirus LTags, N-terminal to the J domain is a sequence motif that mediates binding of LTag to the host cell retinoblastoma protein, a key determinant of cell cycle progression. This unstructured linker region also contains a nuclear localization sequence, which triggers the host cell to transport the protein from the cytoplasm where is it translated to the nucleus where it performs its replication-related functions.

=== Origin-binding domain ===
The OBD binds the viral genome's origin of replication by recognizing specific sequences that occur in the portion of the viral genome known as the non-coding control region. It also forms interactions with host cell proteins, such as replication protein A and Nbs1. The OBD is required for viral replication.

=== Zinc-binding domain ===
The zinc-binding and ATPase domains together comprise the helicase portion of the LTag protein. The primary function of the zinc-binding domain is oligomerization of LTag. Formation of dodecamer structures (two hexameric rings) is required for helicase activity, which begins at the origin of replication through coordination between the OBD, zinc-binding, and ATPase domains.

=== ATPase domain ===
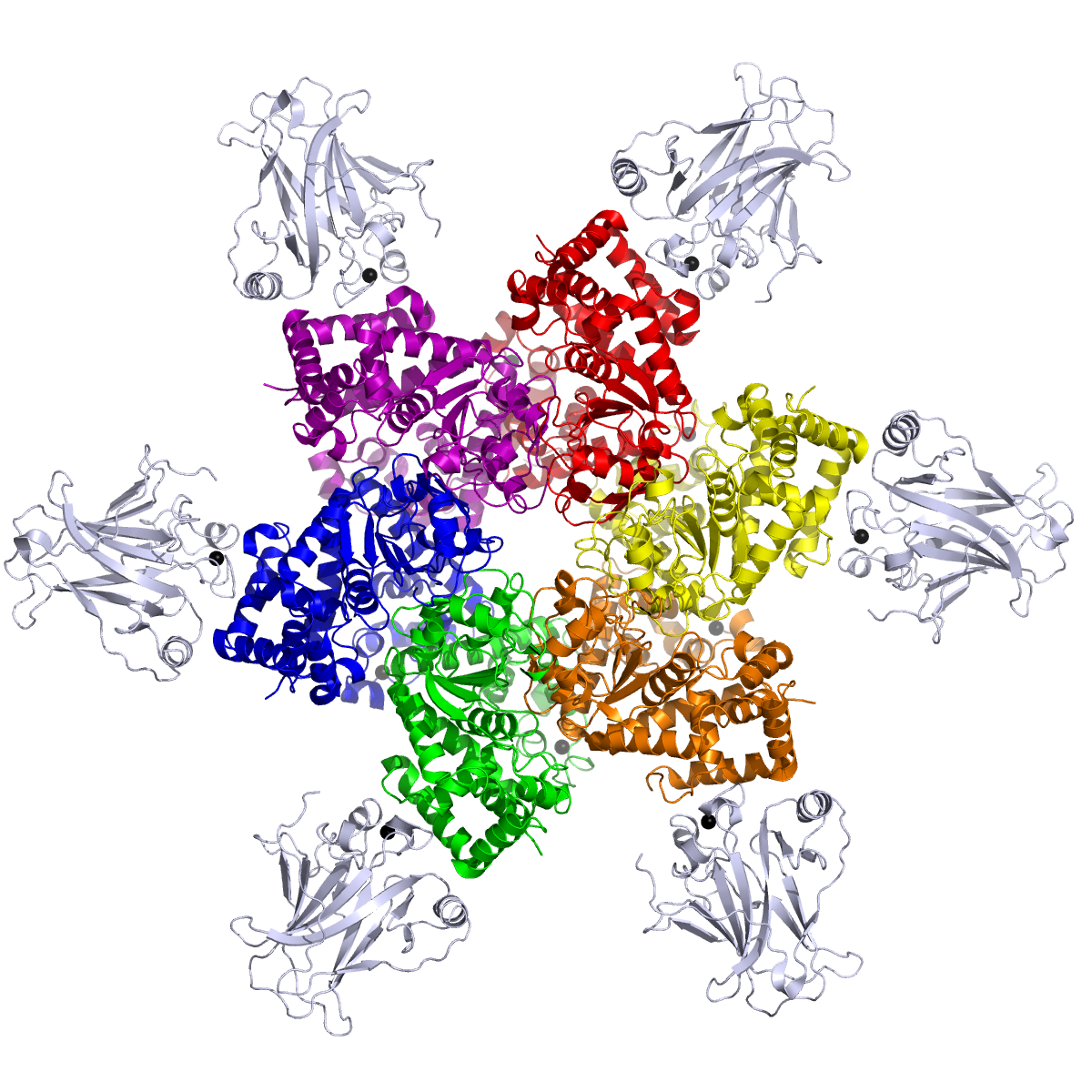
The zinc-binding and helicase domains of LTag shown bound to p53.

The ATPase domain is a member of the AAA+ ATPase family and contains conserved motifs such as the ATP-binding Walker A box. Energy from ATP hydrolysis is required for helicase activity. The ATPase domain also contains regions responsible for protein-protein interactions with host cell proteins, most notably topoisomerase 1 and the cell cycle regulator p53. LTag is unique among known AAA+ ATPases in that it is capable of initiating the melting of DNA around the origin; in most such cases a distinct initiator protein is responsible for this step, after which the helicase continues unwinding.

== Function ==
The major functions of LTag in the viral life cycle involve dysregulation of the host cell's cell cycle and replication of the virus's circular DNA genome. Because polyomavirus genome replication relies on the DNA replication machinery of the host cell, the cell must be in S phase (the part of the cell cycle in which the host cell's genome is normally replicated) in order to provide the necessary molecular machinery for viral DNA replication. The SV40 LTag can induce S phase and activate the host cell's DNA damage response. Coordinated actions of the OBD and helicase regions result in physical manipulation of the viral genome, melting the DNA double helix at the origin of replication and unwinding the circular DNA chromosome in a bidirectional fashion. The structure and function of LTag resembles that of the human papillomavirus oncoproteins.

== Expression ==
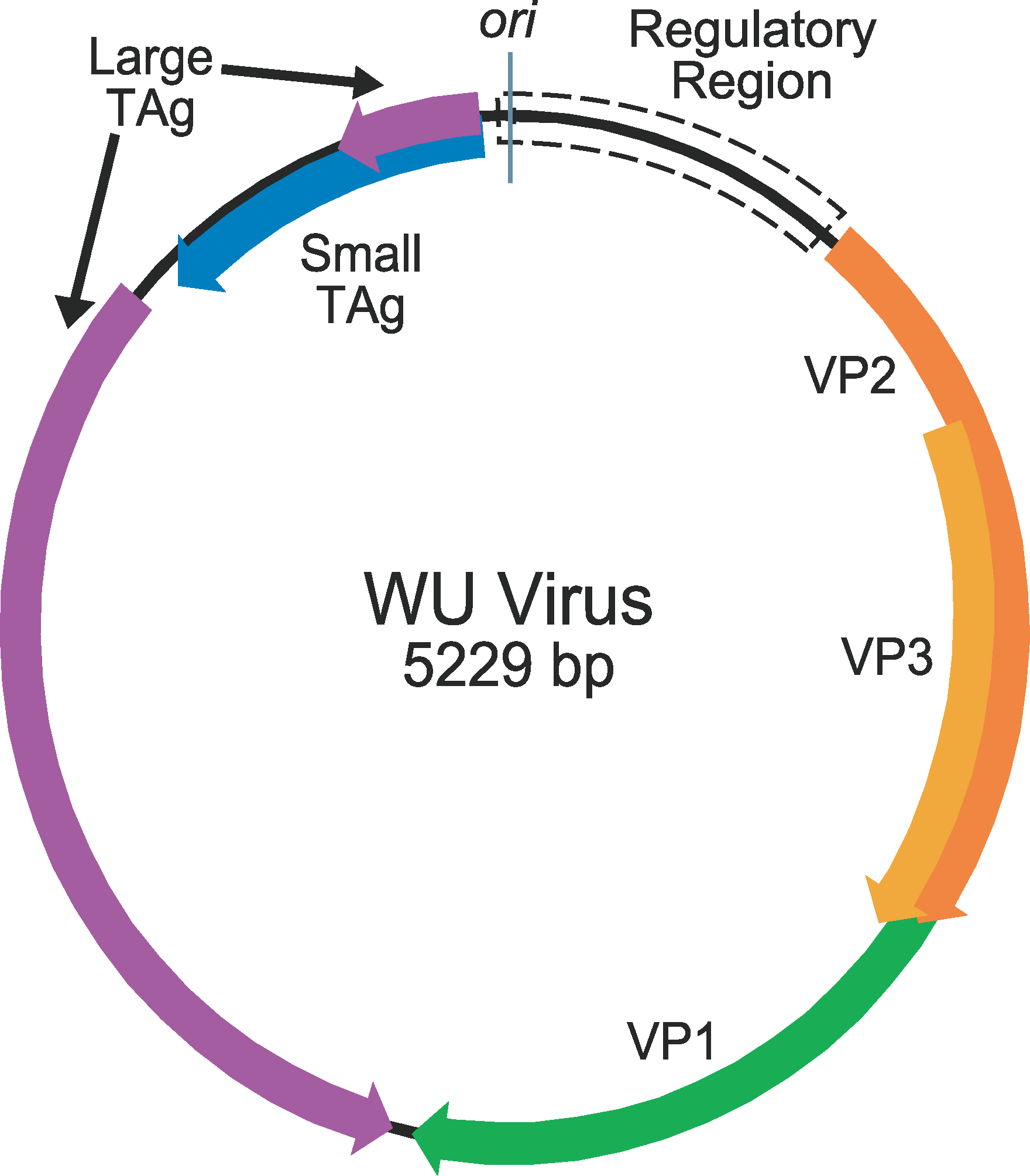
Genome structure of WU virus, a typical human polyomavirus. The early genes are at left, comprising LTag (purple) and STag (blue); the late genes are at right, and the origin of replication is shown at the top of the figure.

LTag is encoded in the "early region" of the polyomavirus genome, so named because this region of the genome is expressed early in the infectious process. (The "late region" contains genes encoding the viral capsid proteins.) The early region typically contains at least two genes and is transcribed as a single messenger RNA processed by alternative splicing. The LTag gene is usually encoded in two exons, of which the first overlaps with the gene for the small tumor antigen (STag); as a result, the two proteins share an N-terminal sequence of around 80 residues, while the remaining ~90 residues of STag are unshared. In a few polyomaviruses - most notably murine polyomavirus, the first member of the family discovered and an efficient oncovirus - an additional protein called middle tumor antigen is expressed from the early region and is highly efficient at cellular transformation.

== Cellular transformation ==
Some, but not all, polyomaviruses are oncoviruses capable of inducing neoplastic transformation in some cells. In oncogenic polyomaviruses, the tumor antigens are responsible for the transformation activity, although the exact molecular mechanisms vary from one virus to another.

=== SV40 ===
The SV40 large T antigen from the SV40 virus is the most well-studied member of the LTag family. SV40, also known as Macaca mulatta polyomavirus 1, natively infects monkeys and does not cause disease; however, it is oncogenic in some rodents and can immortalize some human cells in primary cell culture. SV40 has three early proteins, the large tumor antigen, the small tumor antigen, and a small protein called 17kT that shares most of its sequence with the N-terminus of LTag. Of these, LTag is primarily responsible for cellular transformation. STag alone cannot transform cells, but improves the efficiency with which LTag performs this function. LTag's transforming effect can largely be attributed to its ability to bind the retinoblastoma protein (Rb) and the tumor suppressor protein p53; abrogating either binding site renders LTag unable to transform primary cultured cells. In fact, p53 - now established as a key driver in carcinogenesis - was originally discovered by its ability to bind LTag.

=== Murine polyomavirus ===
Murine polyomavirus (MPyV), described in the 1950s, was the first polyomavirus discovered and can cause tumors in rodents. MPyV has three early proteins; in addition to LTag and STag it also expresses middle tumor antigen, which is primarily responsible for the virus's transforming activity.

=== Merkel cell polyomavirus ===
Merkel cell polyomavirus (MCPyV), also known as Human polyomavirus 5, naturally infects humans and is associated with Merkel cell carcinoma (MCC), a rare form of skin cancer originating from Merkel cells. Although MCPyV infection is common and usually asymptomatic, a large majority of MCC tumors possess a genomically integrated copy of the polyomavirus genome. MCPyV possesses four early proteins, including a 57kT alternative splicing isoform and an alternate protein called ALTO. In Merkel cell polyomavirus, unlike in SV40, LTag alone does not support efficient viral replication and STag is required. Comparison of the sequences of MCPyV and SV40 LTag predicts that they have similar capacities for protein-protein interactions, including preservation of the Rb and p53 binding sites. Mutations in MCPyV LTag associated with tumors consist of large C-terminal truncations that eliminate the DNA replication functions of the protein by removing the zinc-binding and ATPase/helicase domains, without affecting these protein-protein interaction sites.

== Role in taxonomy ==
LTag is a large protein whose domains can be detected and annotated bioinformatically. As a result, it is often used in comparing and determining relationships among polyomaviruses. The International Committee on Taxonomy of Viruses currently classifies polyomaviruses primarily according to the sequence identity of their LTag genes. This system has been questioned by phylogenetic studies suggesting that the evolutionary histories of LTag and major capsid protein VP1 are divergent and that some modern polyomavirus represent chimeric lineages.
