= KI polyomavirus =

Virus classification
- (unranked): Virus
- Realm: Monodnaviria
- Kingdom: Shotokuvirae
- Phylum: Cossaviricota
- Class: Papovaviricetes
- Order: Sepolyvirales
- Family: Polyomaviridae
- Genus: Betapolyomavirus
- Species: Betapolyomavirus tertihominis

Synonyms
- Human polyomavirus 3

Species of virus

KI polyomavirus (also known as KI virus, KIPyV, or Human polyomavirus 3) is a virus of the family Polyomaviridae. It was discovered in 2007 in stored samples of human respiratory secretions collected by the Karolinska Institute, after which the virus is named.

== Discovery ==
KI virus was discovered in 2007 in samples of human respiratory secretions being systematically searched as part of a program for identifying novel human viruses. It was identified by sequence homology to known human polyomaviruses BK virus and JC virus, and simian polyomavirus SV40. KI virus was the third human polyomavirus described and the first to be discovered since BK and JC in 1971. A very similar respiratory virus, WU virus, was also reported later in 2007.

== Genome ==
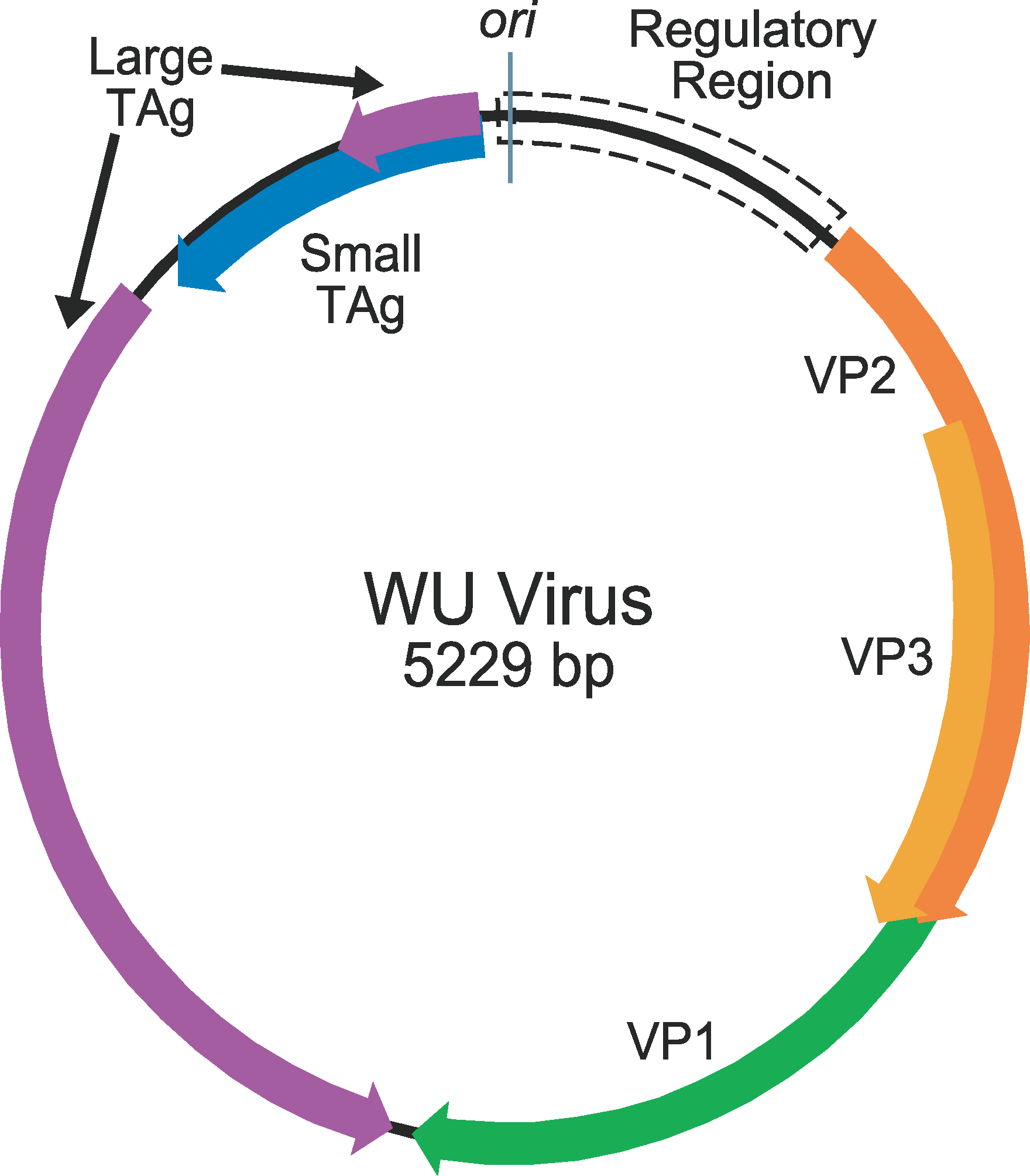
Genome structure of the WU virus. KI virus has a near-identical structure with a slightly different length of 5040 base pairs.

The complete genome of the KI virus has been sequenced and found to be a circular double-stranded DNA genome of 5040 base pairs containing genetic material characteristic of polyomaviruses, encoding five viral proteins: three capsid components, major capsid protein VP1, VP2, and VP3; and two additional proteins involved in replication, the large tumor antigen and small tumor antigen.

== Prevalence ==
The prevalence of KI virus as detected by the presence of its DNA in human samples is generally estimated in the 1-5% range in various locations and populations, with some indication of age-dependence. The virus has been detected in the respiratory secretions of children with respiratory infections in multiple locations. By contrast, one 2009 study placed seroprevalence - that is, prevalence of antibodies against the virus (in this case the VP1 coat protein) - as high as 55% among a population of American adults and 56% among a population of American children. Another 2009 study found around 70% seroprevalence for adults, with age patterns indicating that infants may inherit maternal antibodies against both WU and KI. A 2016 study of polyomavirus seroprevalence found WU virus in 91.3% of samples from another American population. Primary infection is generally believed to occur in childhood.

== Disease association ==
KI virus, like its close relative WU virus, is not known to be associated with any clinical disease despite its presence in respiratory secretions. The rate of co-infection with other respiratory viruses is high, so it is difficult to assign causality to KI virus even where clinical symptoms are present. Some polyomaviruses are well known as carcinogenic, including the human polyomavirus Merkel cell polyomavirus, but KI virus has also not been associated with cancer. While no clear association with clinical symptoms has been identified, there is weak indication that WU and KI viruses may have pathogenic potential in immunocompromised patients.

== Nomenclature and classification ==
KI virus got its name from the Karolinska Institute, the institutional affiliation of the researchers who discovered and reported the virus.

Among the human polyomaviruses, KI is most similar to WU virus. A 2010 proposed classification recommended the division of the polyomaviruses into three genera, containing one genus of avian viruses and two of mammalian viruses; one of the latter was designated Wukipolyomavirus to indicate its two founding members. In an updated classification system for the polyomavirus family proposed in 2016, WU virus is classified as a member of the genus Betapolyomavirus along with BK, JC, and KI.
