= SV40 T-antigen =

SV40 T-antigen is a tumor-inducing antigen, a protein produced by simian vacuolating virus 40 (SV40).

SV40 T-antigen may refer to:

- SV40 small T-antigen
- SV40 large T-antigen

== Related antigens ==
SV40 is a polyomavirus (a member of family Polyomaviridae), and similar proteins in polyomaviruses in general are known as:

- Small T-antigen (small tumor antigen, STag, ST)
- Large T-antigen (large tumor antigen, LTag, LT)

== See also ==
- Middle tumor antigen (MTag, MT), found in some polyomaviruses, but not in SV40
- Oncovirus
- Simian, a group including monkeys, apes, and humans
- Vaccine contamination with SV40
- Virus classification
- Vacuole
  - Vacuolization
