= MW polyomavirus =

Virus classification
- (unranked): Virus
- Realm: Monodnaviria
- Kingdom: Shotokuvirae
- Phylum: Cossaviricota
- Class: Papovaviricetes
- Order: Sepolyvirales
- Family: Polyomaviridae
- Genus: Deltapolyomavirus
- Species: Deltapolyomavirus decihominis

Synonyms
- Human polyomavirus 10

Species of virus

MW polyomavirus (MWPyV, also known as Human polyomavirus 10 and briefly as MXPyV) is a virus of the polyomavirus family that infects human hosts. It was discovered in 2012 and reported independently by several research groups. It has been identified mostly in stool samples from children and has been detected in a variety of geographic locations.

== Discovery and nomenclature ==
MWPyV was discovered in 2012 and independently reported by three different research groups under the names "Malawi polyomavirus", "Mexico polyomavirus", and "Human polyomavirus 10". The first group to publish gave the virus the "Malawi" designation based on the geographic location of the index case, a healthy child from Malawi; the designation "MW polyomavirus" has been included in the International Committee on Taxonomy of Viruses proposed classification of polyomaviruses. It was the 10th human polyomavirus to be discovered.

== Genome ==
The organization of the MWPyV genome is typical of polyomaviruses. At around 4.9 kilobase pairs in length, it contains genes for the small tumor antigen and large tumor antigen and three viral coat proteins, VP1, VP2, and VP3. Different MWPyV isolates have a relatively large amount of sequence variation, up to approximately 5%; this pattern is similar to that seen in BK polyomavirus.

== Taxonomy ==
Phylogenetic analyses of the MWPyV genome suggest different ancestries for the large tumor antigen and the major capsid protein VP1, implying that the virus might have evolved from an ancestral recombination event.

In the 2015 taxonomic update to the polyomavirus group, the International Committee on Taxonomy of Viruses classified MWPyV in the genus Deltapolyomavirus. This genus contains four viruses that infect humans: HPyV6, HPyV7, MW polyomavirus, and STL polyomavirus.

== Prevalence ==
All known human polyomaviruses are fairly common in healthy adult populations and are usually asymptomatic. In studies that profile polyomavirus seroprevalence, or prevalence of detectable antibodies against viral proteins indicating either past or present exposure in immunocompetent adults, estimates of MWPyV prevalence have ranged from approximately 40-85%. Like most human polyomaviruses, MWPyV infection appears to be acquired in early childhood. Studies of the presence of viral DNA, indicating active viral replication, suggest MWPyV prevalence in the range of 1-10% of children, with low or no detection of active viral replication in adults.

== Clinical manifestations ==
As with many recently discovered human polyomaviruses, the clinical significance of MWPyV is poorly characterized. It has been repeatedly found in stool samples from both healthy children and those suffering from diarrhea, with no obvious causal association. MWPyV has also been reported in respiratory secretions in children and may be associated with mild upper respiratory infections in this population. One of the three original reports of MWPyV isolated it from samples of warts on a patient diagnosed with WHIM syndrome; later the closely related STL polyomavirus was isolated from the same surgical sample. This rare disease is associated with susceptibility to human papillomavirus infections, but it is unclear whether the presence of MWPyV in this setting is clinically significant.
