= STL polyomavirus =

Virus classification
- (unranked): Virus
- Realm: Floreoviria
- Kingdom: Shotokuvirae
- Phylum: Cossaviricota
- Class: Papovaviricetes
- Order: Sepolyvirales
- Family: Polyomaviridae
- Genus: Deltapolyomavirus
- Species: Deltapolyomavirus undecihominis

Synonyms
- Human polyomavirus 11

Species of virus

STL polyomavirus (STLPyV, also known as Saint Louis polyomavirus or Human polyomavirus 11) is a virus of the polyomavirus family that infects human hosts. It was first reported in 2013 and is most closely related to MW polyomavirus. It has been identified mostly in stool samples from children and has been detected in a variety of geographic locations.

== Discovery ==
STL polyomavirus was first discovered in 2013 in a stool sample from a healthy child in Malawi; the same research group then detected the virus in stool from children in The Gambia and Saint Louis, Missouri (after which the virus was named). The designation "STL polyomavirus" was included in the International Committee on Taxonomy of Viruses proposed classification of polyomaviruses. It was the 11th human polyomavirus to be discovered.

== Genome ==
The organization of the STLPyV genome is typical of polyomaviruses. At around 4.8 kilobase pairs in length, it contains genes for the small tumor antigen and large tumor antigen, a novel additional tumor antigen, and three viral coat proteins, VP1, VP2, and VP3. It is most closely related to MW polyomavirus, also first isolated from a child in Malawi. Different STLPyV isolates have a relatively large amount of sequence variation, up to approximately 5%; this pattern is similar to both MWPyV and the much better characterized BK polyomavirus.

A distinctive characteristic of the STLPyV genome is its alternatively spliced tumor antigen; in addition to the small and large tumor antigens highly conserved in polyomaviruses, STLPyV also expresses a third tumor antigen designated 229T, which contains a novel fusion of portions of the small and large tumor antigen sequences.

== Taxonomy ==
Among the human polyomaviruses, STLPyV is most closely related to MWPyV; like MWPyV, its genome suggests different ancestries for the large tumor antigen and the major capsid protein VP1, implying that the virus might have evolved from an ancestral recombination event.

In the 2015 taxonomic update to the polyomavirus group, the International Committee on Taxonomy of Viruses classified STLPyV in the genus Deltapolyomavirus. This genus contains four viruses that infect humans: HPyV6, HPyV7, MW polyomavirus, and STL polyomavirus.

== Prevalence ==
All known human polyomaviruses are fairly common in healthy adult populations and are usually asymptomatic. In a study that profiled polyomavirus seroprevalence, or prevalence of detectable antibodies against viral proteins indicating either past or present exposure in immunocompetent adults, the estimate of STLPyV prevalence was approximately 70%, with an age distribution consistent with transmission of maternal antibodies combined with early childhood infection. Studies of the presence of viral DNA, indicating active viral replication, suggest STLPyV prevalence in the range of 1-2% of children.
