= HuLEC-5a =

Secondary cell line

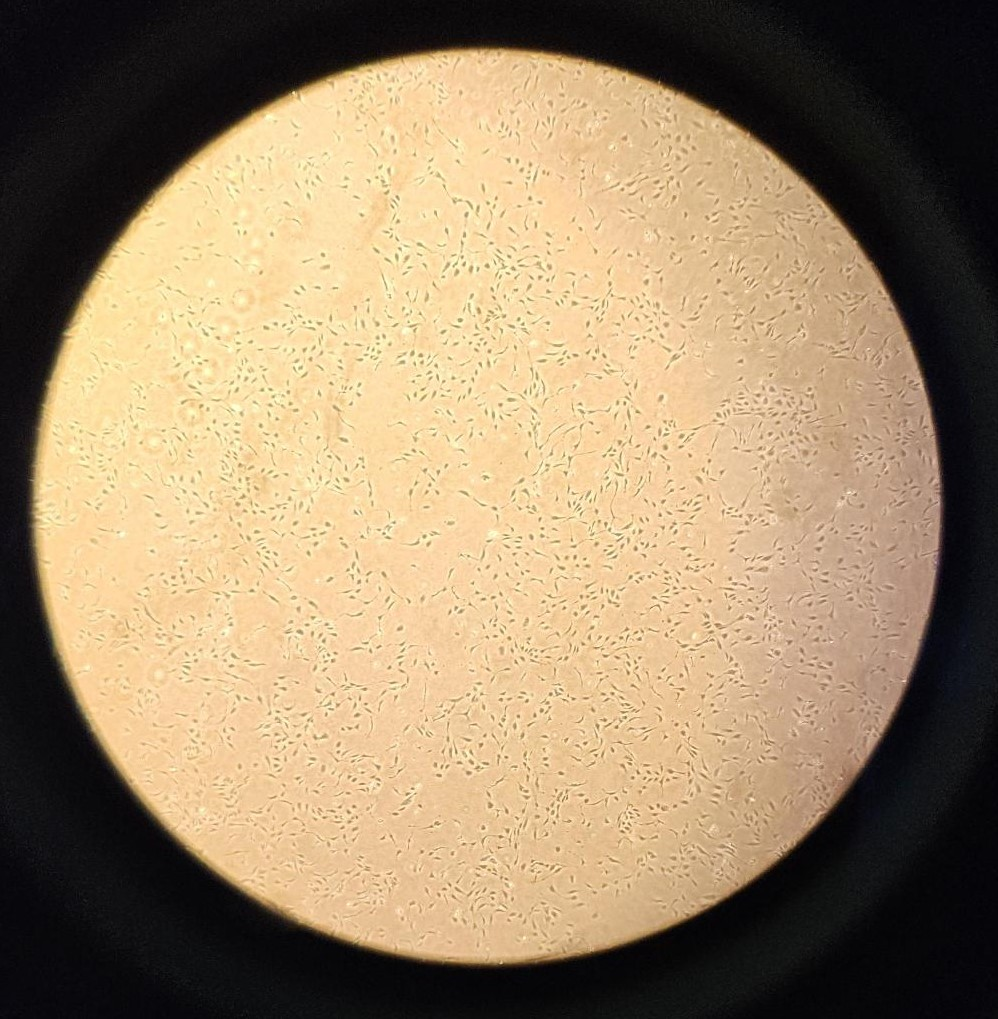
Human Lung Microvascular Endothelium cells (HuLECs) pictured down a microscope at 200x zoom

Human Lung Microvascular Endothelium cells transfected with pRSV-T 5A (HuLEC-5a or HuLECs) are a cell line derived from the pulmonary endothelium of a human male and subsequently transfected with a PBR322 based plasmid containing the coding region for SV40 in order to immortalise them.

HuLECs are used as a laboratory model for the study of the function and pathology of the pulmonary endothelium to research conditions such as ARDS, Tuberculosis, and Interstitial lung disease.

HuLECs are used due to their relatively cheap cost compared to other models of the pulmonary endothelium such as HLMVECs, as well as their hardiness, and their ability to indefinitely proliferate in a laboratory setting.

When fully confluent, HuLECs exhibit a cobblestone phenotype just as they do when lining vessel walls.
