= Decoy cells =

Virally infected epithelial cells found in urine

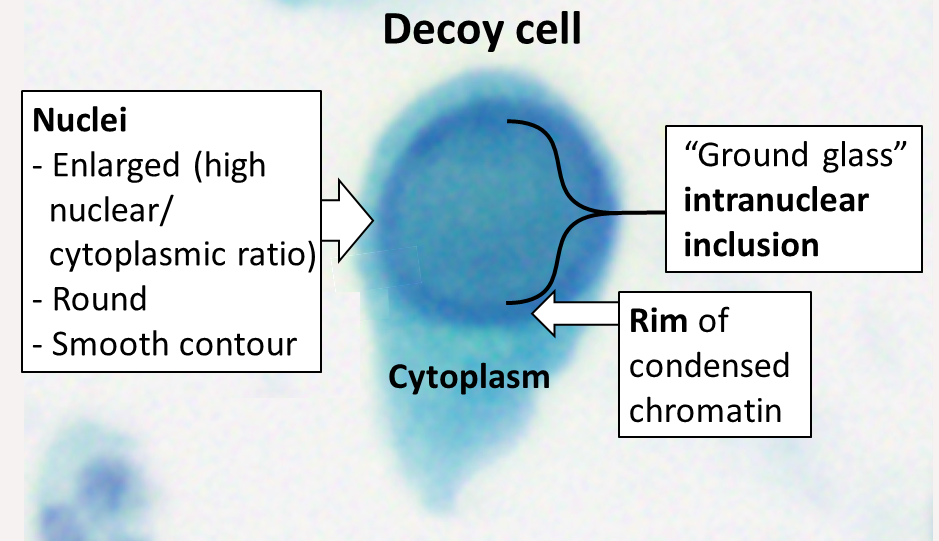
Decoy cell cytology, using Papanicolaou stain. The high nuclear to cytoplasmic ratio makes it resemble cancer (thus the name "decoy cell") but the inclusion body distinguishes it.

Decoy cells are virally infected epithelial cells that can be found in the urine. Decoy cells owe their name to their strong resemblance to cancer cells, and may as such confuse the diagnosis of either viral infection or urothelial malignancy. During the 1950s, cytotechnologist Andrew Ricci observed cells mimicking cancer cells by they were not, in a group of persons working in some kinds of industries - they were referred to as “decoy cells”, analogous to “decoy ducks” used in hunting wild ducks, by Andrew Ricci, a cytotechnologist working under renowned cytopathologist Dr. Leopold G. Koss.

== Epidemiology and presentation ==
Decoy cells are mostly prevalent in immunocompromised individuals, such as transplant recipients who are treated with immunosuppressive medication in order for their immune system not to reject the foreign transplanted organ. Several viruses mediated the emergence of decoy cells, amongst which cytomegalovirus and polyomavirus. Decoy cells are virus infected urothelial cells with a distinct morphology of enlarged nuclei and intranuclear inclusions. In renal transplant recipients, such cells may be found in up to 40 percent of cases. Decoy cells are clinically relevant since they may be used as a prognostic marker for clinical conditions such as polyomavirus BK-induced nephropathy in renal transplant recipients, and haemorrhagic cystitis in haematopoietic stem cell transplant recipients.

== Diagnosis ==
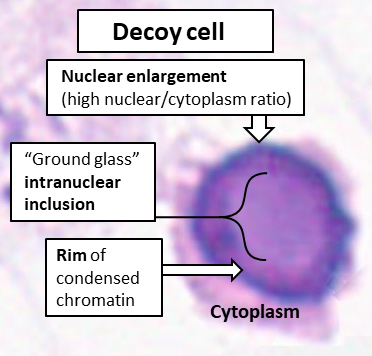
Decoy cell on H&E stain. The irregular nuclear membrane further distinguishes it from a cancer cell.

Decoy cells can be seen in a urine sample through Papanicolaou staining or phase-contrast microscopy. By Papanicolaou stain, most decoy cells have an enlarged nucleus that bears a basophilic inclusion which is surrounded by chromatin that confers a ground-glass or gelatinous appearance. Sometimes the nuclear inclusion has a vesicular aspect, the chromatin may be clumped, and it may be surrounded by a halo. When decoy cells derive from the urothelium, the heavily enlarged and altered nuclei as well as the irregular shape of the cell body can mimic the changes observed in neoplastic cells.

By phase-contrast microscopy, decoy cells show the same abnormalities described for stained specimens, namely, enlargement of the nucleus with a ground-glass or vesicular appearance, altered chromatin, enlarged nucleoli, the presence of a halo, and at times also cytoplasmic vacuoles. In our experience, these features make decoy cells different from tubular cells and transitional cells found in all other conditions. The only exception is represented by cells infected by cytomegalovirus, which frequently show a ‘bird's eye’ appearance.

As such, decoy cells may strongly resemble malign cancer cells, from which they also derive their name. This is because they can be mistaken for cancer cells, or the other way around where cancer cells can be mistaken for decoy cells.

== Signs and symptoms ==
Decoy cells themselves do not cause any disease, and they may be found in the urine of healthy individuals. In immunodeficient individuals, such as transplant recipients or severely immunocompromised HIV-infected individuals, viruses in general more often reactivate owing to a lack of immunologic surveillance. As such, in these individuals, decoy cells are also seen more frequently.

The viruses that induce the emergence of decoy cells, may causes disease, but again mainly in immunocompromised individuals. Cytomegalovirus may be the cause of retinitis, respiratory symptoms and or enteritis. Polyomaviruses may cause progressive multifocal leukoencephalopathy (JC virus) and polyomavirus-associated nephropathy, ureteral stenosis and hemorrhagic cystitis (BK virus). The latter condition mainly occurs in hematopoietic stem cell transplant recipients.

Several publications have tried to use decoy cells as a prognostic marker for polyomavirus-associated diseases such as polyomavirus BK-associated nephropathy (BKVAN), a condition occurring only in immunocompromised individuals and especially in renal transplant recipients. BKVAN is a condition wherein overt replication of polyomavirus BK causes an interstitial inflammation in a kidney.

== Treatment ==
Decoy cells alone do not need to be treated since they do not necessarily indicate pathology. However, in the context of overt viral replication against the background of immunodeficiency, the viruses that cause the emergence of decoy cells must be treated. For polyomavirus BK, only the restoration of immunologic function and the subsequent reconstitution of cells with antiviral activity such as natural killer cells and cytotoxic T cells has proven to be effective. Restoration of the immune system can be achieved via different paths according to the different patient groups. For example, in severely immunocompromised HIV-patients, previously called AIDS-patients, immunologic function can be restored by treatment with highly active anti-retroviral therapy. In kidney transplant recipients who are treated with immunosuppressive agents, immunologic function can be treated by tapering of the immunosuppressive regimen. Other agents that have been proposed to target polyomavirus BK, such as cidofovir, fluoroquinolones, leflunomide, and statins are far from established and the published results on their effectivity are conflicting. Also, some of these agents may cause severe long-lasting side effects.
