= Viroporin =

Viral proteins that modify cellular membranes

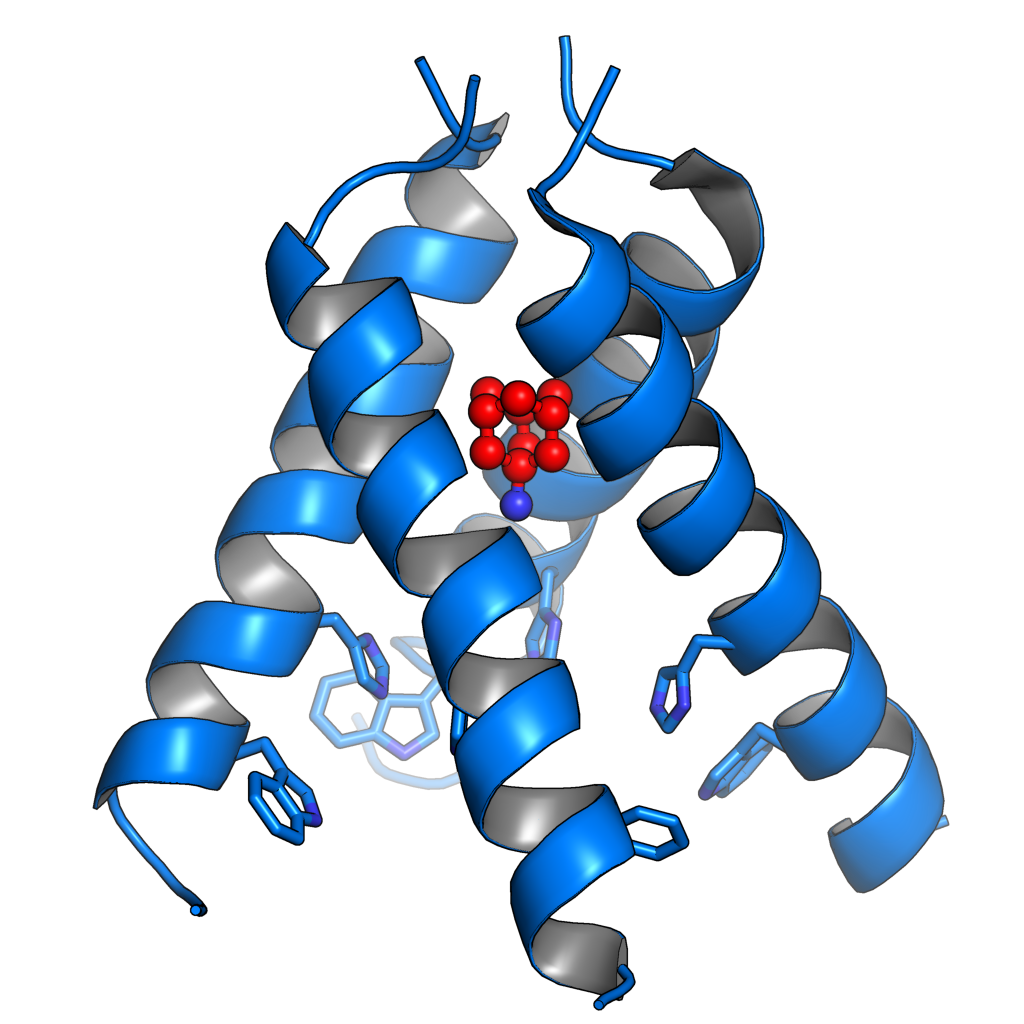
The transmembrane helical tetramer of the influenza A virus M2 protein, which functions as a proton channel, in complex with the channel-blocking drug amantadine (shown in red). Highly conserved tryptophan and histidine residues known to play key roles in mediating proton transport are shown as sticks. From PDB: 3C9J.

Viroporins are small and usually hydrophobic multifunctional viral proteins that modify cellular membranes, thereby facilitating virus release from infected cells. Viroporins are capable of assembling into oligomeric ion channels or pores in the host cell's membrane, rendering it more permeable and thus facilitating the exit of virions from the cell. Many viroporins also have additional effects on cellular metabolism and homeostasis mediated by protein-protein interactions with host cell proteins. While viroporins are not considered necessary for replication of viruses, they do aid with increased virion spread and viral infection. They are found in a variety of viral genomes but are particularly common in RNA viruses. Many viruses that cause human disease express viroporins. These viruses include hepatitis C virus, HIV-1, influenza A virus, poliovirus, respiratory syncytial virus, and SARS-CoV. Recently, viroporins have been discovered in plant viruses such as turnip mosaic virus, barley yellow striate mosaic virus, and citrus tristeza virus.

== Size and structure ==
Viroporins range in size from approximately 100 to 120 amino acids in length and 6-12 kDa in molecular weight. Oligomerization of viroporins most commonly results in tetramers that reside in either the plasma membrane or ER membrane and act as transport channels. Each type of viroporin contains at least one transmembrane alpha helix that interacts with these membranes. Further, viroporins are commonly considered to be integral membrane proteins. Viroporins exhibit extreme variability in their additional residues, with some containing stretches of basic amino acids (Class II viroporins) and others having aromatic amino acids. This variability contributes to diverse functions across viroporins.

== Classification ==
Current classification methods group viroporins into two main classes, each with two subgroups, based on their number of transmembrane domains and their endoplasmic reticulum membrane topology.

=== Class I viroporins ===
All Class I viroporins contain one transmembrane domain that takes on a helical shape. They also contain a short N-terminal domain and a long C-terminal tail. Subclasses of Class I viroporins are divided based on their orientation about the ER membrane. In Class IA viroporins, the short N-terminal domain is located in the ER lumen with the C-terminal tail residing in the cytosol. Class IB viroporins are the opposite, with the N-terminal domain in the cytosol and the C-terminal tail in the ER lumen.

=== Class II viroporins ===
Class II viroporins have two transmembrane domains, and a basic amino acid loop connects them. This viroporin class primarily originates from polyproteins, a viral replication mechanism where all functional proteins are translated as a part of the same open reading frame (ORF). The ORF also encodes a self-cleaving protease, which cuts the large polyprotein into each of its functional protein parts after translation is completed. Viroporins in this group often have proteolytic precursors with terminal domains known to form peptidases. Class IIA viroporins have their N- and C-terminal ends located in the ER lumen, and these terminals are located in the cytosol in Class IIB viroporins. Viroproins that have more than 2 transmembrane domains (ex. SARS-CoV) or none at all (ex. Rotavirus) do not fit this current classification system, and more research is needed in this area.

== Viroporin oligomerization ==
Viroporins cannot reach their functional form until they complete homo-oligomerization, a process by which individual viroporin proteins associate with themselves. This homo-oligomerization often results in formation of tetramers and occurs in two main steps, similar to the process of general membrane protein folding.

=== Translational insertion into the ER membrane ===
The first part of this process is insertion into the ER membrane. Class I and Class II viroporins differ in how this process occurs. Most Class I viroporins are understood to carry out co-translational translocation, which occurs at the ER membrane. Their N-terminal ends contain a short amino acid sequence known as a signal sequence. Once that signal sequence has been translated by the ribosome and is exposed in the cytosol, a ribonucleoprotein known as the signal recognition particle (SRP) recognizes the signal sequence. The SRP temporarily arrests translation and brings the ribosome complex to the SRP receptor that is anchored in the membrane. The ribosome complex with the partially-translated protein is transferred to the translocon, and translation resumes as normal. The signal sequence is cleaved in the ER lumen by a signal peptidase. The transmembrane domain acts as an anchor, called a signal anchor sequence, for the viroporin monomer in the ER membrane. As mentioned, the ER lumen contains the N-terminal ends for Class IA viroporins and the C-terminal ends for Class IB viroporins. For viroporin polypeptides that do not contain a signal sequence, the hydrophobic transmembrane domain can be recognized by the SRP and consequently serves as both a signal sequence and signal anchor.

In Class II viroporins, how they are localized to the ER membrane for translation varies depending on their protein of origin; types of Class II viroporins do not all exhibit the same general mechanisms as are seen with Class I. For example the HCV p7 viroporin actually does utilize a more recognized mechanism where its 5’ core protein helps direct co-translational translocation to the ER membrane. The PV1 viroporin contains a downstream hydrophobic residue without a signal sequence and is hypothesized to carry out a post-translational translocation mechanism; however, the self-cleavage of the origin polyprotein leaves evidence of a new hydrophobic residue after cleavage with SRP recognition potential, which could result in co-translational activity. In PV1 2B that has been experimentally isolated, a similar phenomenon occurs where a hydrophobic sequence is present that can be used as a recognition site by the SRP, but a post-translational translocation mechanism is observed.

Regardless of translation mechanism, each type of viroporin eventually anchors its hydrophobic region into the membrane of the organelle to which it has been directed and is the protein’s final destination. Insertion into the membrane is facilitated by the translocon, a channel between the extracellular and cytoplasmic spaces within the cell. Because these spaces are aqueous and favor hydrophilic domains, the insertion of the hydrophobic region into the membrane requires a thermodynamic energy transfer. Folding of the hydrophobic transmembrane domain into an alpha helix significantly reduces the energy cost for viroproin anchoring.

=== Interactions between transmembrane helices ===
The second and most crucial aspect of the oligomerization process is transmembrane helix-helix interactions. Because viroporins need to associate with other monomers to form their functional pores, issues with oligomerization likely result in loss of function and impact viral persistence. Van der Waals forces (hydrophobic interactions) are the primary driving force behind the helix formation and packing within the membrane. Small, nonpolar amino acids such as glycine and alanine amino acids help the helices tightly associate with each other, as their presence does not provide much steric hindrance. However, evidence of low glycine content in viroporin transmembrane domain suggests that these non-bulky amino acids are not present to facilitate packing of individual helices and are likely specific to helix-helix interactions. As seen with many mechanisms between Class I and II viroporins, there are differences with general structure and topology as well as translation mechanisms, and these differences ultimately drive the interactions between viroporin monomers; high levels of variation with interactions are seen for each viroporin type, solidifying the notion that protein-protein interactions are highly specified in nature, especially in viral proteins.

== Function ==
=== Essentiality ===
Most viroporins are not essential, but their absence significantly reduces the efficiency of viral propagation. There is significant variation in the consequences of viroporin depletion: while hepatitis C virus is incapable of propagation without its p7 protein viroporin, influenza A virus and HIV-1 see decreases in in vitro viral titer of 10- to 100-fold in the absence of their respective viroporins, but remain capable of propagation. In most cases absence of viroporin in the viral genome can be rescued by the presence of viroporin in trans, and sometimes viral replication can be partially rescued in the presence of another virus' viroporin.

=== Membrane permeabilization ===
The most well-studied and well-established function of viroporins is the permeabilization of the cell membrane to ions and small solutes. Before viroporins themselves were understood as a class, it was well known that many viruses induce membrane permeabilization in infected cells; viroporins are at least partially responsible for this effect, particularly when it occurs late in the viral replication cycle. Viroporins expressed transgenically, in the absence of their virus of origin, induce the same effect, a feature that has facilitated viroporin discovery.

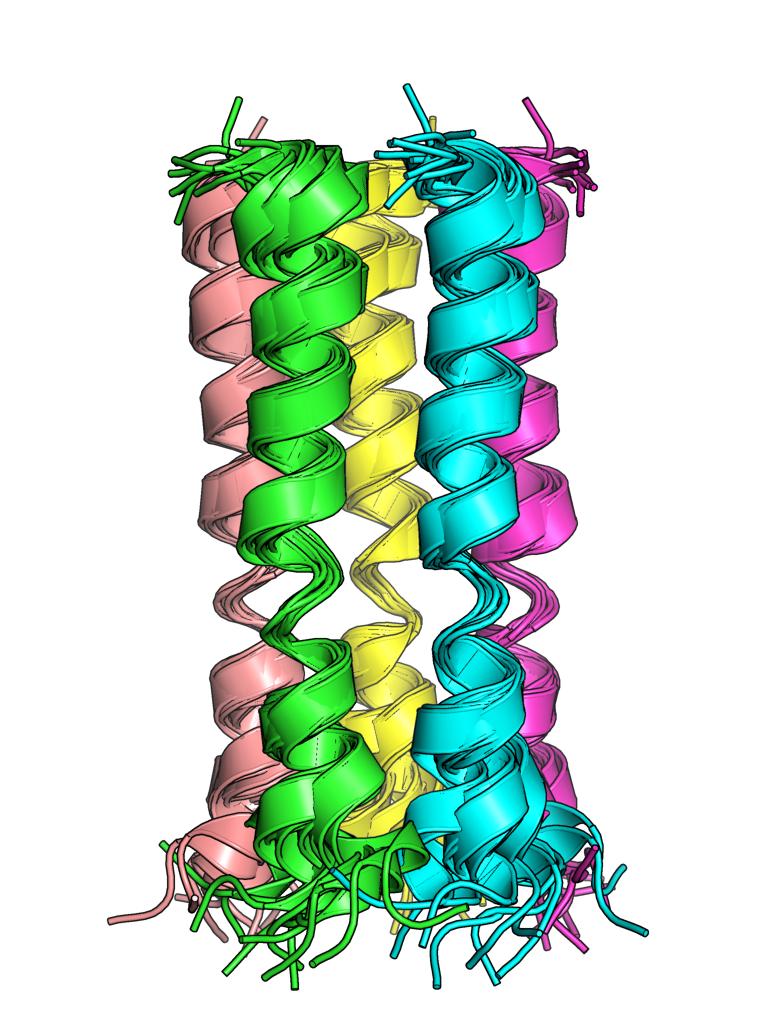
Solid-state NMR-based model of the pentameric pore formed by the transmembrane helices of the SARS-CoV-2 E protein, which forms a viroporin permeable to cations. Rendered from PDB: 7K3G.

In most cases, pores formed by viroporins are nonselective or only weakly selective for particular ions or small molecules. However, some examples do show strong selectivity; examples include the influenza A virus M2 proton channel protein, which is highly selective for protons and is active at low pH, and the Chlorella virus Kcv protein, which is selective for potassium ions. An alternative mechanism is illustrated by the SARS-CoV E protein, which forms a pore that integrates membrane lipids whose polar head groups influence ion selectivity. The homologous E protein of SARS-CoV-2 has been structurally characterized by solid-state NMR and found to form a pentamer permeable to cations.

Loss of membrane polarization can promote viral yields through a variety of mechanisms that operate throughout the viral life cycle. In enveloped viruses, viroporins are not highly concentrated in the viral envelope, but nevertheless their presence may promote viral entry into the cell; the influenza A virus provides a well-studied example. Viroporins in the membranes of organelles such as the Golgi apparatus can influence those organelles' internal environments, which can modulate protein trafficking of viral proteins or protect the proteins from the low pH they would otherwise encounter in these cellular compartments. In non-enveloped viruses, the membrane permeability changes may be sufficient to induce cell lysis, thereby permitting the new virions to exit the cell. In enveloped viruses, viroporins' depolarization effect is thought to promote viral budding. Abrogating the ion channel or pore function of viroporins, either through mutations that block conductance without disrupting other functions or through channel-blocking drugs, usually reduces or eliminates viral propagation.

=== Genome replication ===
Most viruses encoding viroporins can replicate their genomes in the absence of the viroporin, even if they are impaired in propagation. Rotaviruses and picornaviruses, however, rely on their viroporins to facilitate the formation of viroplasm, or specialized intracellular compartments remodeled from the membrane of the endoplasmic reticulum in which genome replication occurs.

=== Protein-protein interactions ===
Some viroporins have established functional effects exerted through protein-protein interactions. For example, the HIV-1 viroporin Vpu promotes viral budding through interactions with CD4 and tetherin, though the precise molecular mechanism of this interaction is not known. The JC polyomavirus agnoprotein functions as a viroporin in addition to other roles mediated through interactions with viral proteins such as major capsid protein VP1.

== Role in disease ==
=== Virulence factors ===
Viroporins can also be considered virulence factors; in viruses in which viroporins are not essential, their pathogenicity is attenuated in the absence of viroporin beyond the level expected by the effects on viral propagation. In some cases the membrane permeabilization effects of viroporins activate the inflammasome, a protein complex associated with activation of innate immunity which, when overactive, can cause disease symptoms.

=== Oncoproteins ===
The human papillomavirus 16 E5 protein, the least well-studied of the three known oncogenic HPV proteins, was reported in 2012 to be a viroporin. This was the first known example of an oncogenic viroporin.

=== Drug targets ===
Because some viroporins are essential for viral propagation, they are often considered to be appealing drug targets for development of antiviral drugs. Although many chemical compounds have been reported to interfere with the ion channel functions of various viroporins, clinical usage is relatively rare. Amantadine, which was discovered in the 1960s and has been in clinical use against influenza A for some time, is an example of a viroporin-targeting drug; however, a 2014 Cochrane review did not find benefit for its use in children or elderly people and the US CDC does not recommend drugs of this class due to widespread resistance mutations.

== Examples ==
Viroporins can be found in a large number of viruses with distinct genomic organizations and replication mechanisms.

Known viroporins
Family	Virus	Type	Viroporin protein
Coronaviridae	SARS coronavirus	(+)ssRNA	E protein, 3A protein
Coronaviridae	Murine hepatitis virus	(+)ssRNA	E protein
Flaviviridae	Hepatitis C virus	(+)ssRNA	p7 protein
Orthomyxoviridae	Influenza A virus	(-)ssRNA	M2 protein
Orthomyxoviridae	Influenza B virus	(-)ssRNA	NB protein, BM2 protein
Orthomyxoviridae	Influenza C virus	(-)ssRNA	CM2 protein
Papillomaviridae	Human papillomavirus 16	dsDNA	E protein
Phycodnaviridae	Paramecium bursaria chlorella virus 1	dsDNA	Kcv protein
Phycodnaviridae	Acanthocystis turfacea chlorella virus 1	dsDNA	Kcv protein
Picornaviridae	Coxsackievirus	(+)ssRNA	Protein 2B
Picornaviridae	Enterovirus 71	(+)ssRNA	Protein 2B
Picornaviridae	Poliovirus	(+)ssRNA	Protein 2B, Protein 3A
Pneumoviridae	Human respiratory syncytial virus	(-)ssRNA	Small hydrophobic (SH) protein
Polyomaviridae	JC polyomavirus	dsDNA	Agnoprotein
Polyomaviridae	SV40	dsDNA	Viral protein 4
Retroviridae	Human immunodeficiency virus 1	ssRNA-RT	Vpu
Rhabdoviridae	Bovine ephemeral fever virus	(-)ssRNA	Alpha 10p protein
Spinareoviridae	Avian reovirus	dsRNA	p10 protein
Togaviridae	Semliki Forest virus	(+)ssRNA	Protein 6K
Togaviridae	Sindbis virus	(+)ssRNA	Protein 6K
Togaviridae	Ross River virus	(+)ssRNA	Protein 6K

This table represents a composite of Table 1 from Gonzalez et al. 2003, Table 1 from Wang et al. 2011, and Table 1, Box 1, and Box 2 from Nieva et al. 2012.

== See also ==
- Holins, small pore-forming transmembrane proteins produced by dsDNA bacteriophages
