= Human polyomavirus 6 =

Virus classification
- (unranked): Virus
- Realm: Monodnaviria
- Kingdom: Shotokuvirae
- Phylum: Cossaviricota
- Class: Papovaviricetes
- Order: Sepolyvirales
- Family: Polyomaviridae
- Genus: Deltapolyomavirus
- Species: Deltapolyomavirus sextihominis

Species of virus

Human polyomavirus 6 (HPyV6) is a virus of the polyomavirus family that infects human hosts. It was discovered in 2010 and is a component of the skin flora in healthy adults.

== Discovery ==
HPyV6 was first discovered in 2010 by rolling circle amplification, a genetic technique that efficiently amplifies and detects circular DNA, such as a polyomavirus genome. It was identified as a component of skin flora in healthy adults, along with Merkel cell polyomavirus (which can cause Merkel cell cancer) and Human polyomavirus 7.

== Taxonomy ==
HPyV6 is closely related to HPyV7, which was discovered at the same time; the two viruses' genomes share 68% sequence identity. In the 2015 taxonomic update to the polyomavirus group, the International Committee on Taxonomy of Viruses classified HPyV6 as a member of the genus Deltapolyomavirus. This genus contains four viruses that infect humans: HPyV6, HPyV7, MW polyomavirus, and STL polyomavirus.

== Prevalence ==
All known human polyomaviruses are fairly common in healthy adult populations and are usually asymptomatic. In studies that profile polyomavirus seroprevalence, or prevalence of detectable antibodies against viral proteins indicating either past or present exposure in immunocompetent adults, estimates of HPyV6 prevalence have ranged from approximately 60–85%, with evidence of low prevalence among children and increasing prevalence with age. The age-dependent pattern of seroprevalence featuring a decline at around six months old is consistent with the transmission of maternal antibodies. A study of cutaneous viruses in men found prevalence of HPyV6 DNA—indicating actively replicating virus—at around 12%. Another similar study reported HPyV6 DNA prevalence at around 30%, with 24% showing persistent viral shedding over time.

== Clinical manifestations ==
As with many recently discovered human polyomaviruses, the clinical significance of HPyV6 is poorly characterized. Attempts to detect polyomaviruses in a variety of tumor types have consistently found that HPyV6 is either absent or present at very low viral loads, indicating that it is unlikely to be causally related to the tumor.

HPyV6, and the closely related HPyV7, have been linked to skin rashes known as pruritic and dyskeratotic dermatoses in immunocompromised patients in case reports, though a causal association has not yet been established.
