= SV40 Cancer Foundation =

The SV40 Cancer Foundation is an educational organization devoted to raising awareness about a potential link between the simian virus SV40 and human cancer.

The SV40 Cancer Foundation was founded by Raphaele and Michael Horwin. The Horwin's son Alexander Horwin was born on June 7, 1996, and was given oral polio vaccine in November 1997. On August 10, 1998, Alexander was diagnosed with medulloblastoma, a malignant (cancerous) pediatric brain tumor, leading to his death on January 31, 1999. The Horwins contend that the polio vaccine their son ingested was contaminated with SV40, leading to his death. Tests performed at four laboratories on Alexander's brain tissue demonstrated the presence of the virus.

The SV40 Cancer Foundation views their mission as raising public awareness of this threat and lobbying for more research funding for this area. On September 10, 2003, the Horwins got Congressman Dan Burton, Chair of the Subcommittee on Human Rights and Wellness, United States House Committee on Oversight and Reform to hold a hearing into SV40 contamination of vaccines.

The United States National Cancer Institute announced in 2004 that although SV40 does cause cancer in some animal models, "substantial epidemiological evidence has accumulated to indicate that SV40 likely does not cause cancer in humans."
