= Human polyomavirus 7 =

Virus classification
- (unranked): Virus
- Realm: Monodnaviria
- Kingdom: Shotokuvirae
- Phylum: Cossaviricota
- Class: Papovaviricetes
- Order: Sepolyvirales
- Family: Polyomaviridae
- Genus: Deltapolyomavirus
- Species: Deltapolyomavirus septihominis

Species of virus

Human polyomavirus 7 (HPyV7) is a virus of the polyomavirus family that infects human hosts. It was discovered in 2010 and is a common component of the skin flora in healthy adults. There is limited evidence from case reports linking the virus to a skin rash occurring in immunocompromised organ transplant recipients.

== Discovery ==
HPyV7 was first discovered in 2010 by rolling circle amplification, a genetic technique that efficiently amplifies and detects circular DNA, such as a polyomavirus genome. It was identified as a component of skin flora in healthy adults, along with Merkel cell polyomavirus (which can cause Merkel cell cancer) and Human polyomavirus 6.

== Taxonomy ==
HPyV7 is closely related to HPyV6, which was discovered at the same time; the two viruses' genomes share 68% sequence identity. In the 2015 taxonomic update to the polyomavirus group, the International Committee on Taxonomy of Viruses classified HPyV7 in the genus Deltapolyomavirus. This genus contains four viruses that infect humans: HPyV6, HPyV7, MW polyomavirus, and STL polyomavirus.

== Prevalence ==
All known human polyomaviruses are fairly common in healthy adult populations and are usually asymptomatic. In studies that profile polyomavirus seroprevalence, or prevalence of detectable antibodies against viral proteins indicating either past or present exposure in immunocompetent adults, estimates of HPyV7 prevalence have ranged from approximately 35–85%, with evidence of low prevalence among children and increasing prevalence with age. The age-dependent pattern of seroprevalence featuring a decline at around six months old is consistent with the transmission of maternal antibodies. A study of cutaneous viruses in men found prevalence of HPyV7 DNA—indicating actively replicating virus—at around 2%. Another similar study reported HPyV7 DNA prevalence at around 14%, with 10% showing persistent viral shedding over time.

== Clinical manifestations ==
As with many recently discovered human polyomaviruses, the clinical significance of HPyV7 is poorly characterized. Attempts to detect polyomaviruses in a variety of tumor types have consistently found that HPyV7 is either absent or present at very low viral loads, indicating that it is unlikely to be causally related to the tumor.

HPyV7 has been associated in case reports with a skin condition in immunocompromised patients—HPyV7-related epithelial hyperplasia—specifically lung transplant recipients on a regimen of immunosuppressive drugs. The reported skin manifestations consisted of severely pruritic (itchy) velvet-textured plaques initially interpreted clinically as drug side effects. Histological findings include viral particles contained in eosinophilic keratinocytes. Evidence of actively replicating HPyV7 was identified in affected tissue, supporting the hypothesis that the virus caused the rash.
