= Epidemiology of herpes simplex =

The epidemiology of herpes simplex is of substantial epidemiologic and public health interest. Worldwide, the rate of infection with herpes simplex virus—counting both HSV-1 and HSV-2—is around 90%. Although many people infected with HSV develop labial or genital lesions (herpes simplex), the majority are either undiagnosed or display no physical symptoms—individuals with no symptoms are described as asymptomatic or as having subclinical herpes.

In many infections, the first symptom a person will have of their own infection is the horizontal transmission to a sexual partner or the vertical transmission of neonatal herpes to a newborn at term. Since most asymptomatic individuals are unaware of their infection, they are considered at high risk for spreading HSV. Many studies have been performed around the world to estimate the numbers of individuals infected with HSV-1 and HSV-2 by determining if they have developed antibodies against either viral species.

This information provides population prevalence of HSV viral infections in individuals with or without active disease. Note that there are population subgroups that are more vulnerable for HSV infections, such as cancer chemotherapy patients.

Seroprevalence estimates for HSV-1 and HSV-2
Location	Year(s)	Prevalence (%)		
Location	Year(s)	HSV-1	HSV-2	
Location	Year(s)	Total	Female	Male
Africa
Benin	1997–8	–	30	12
Cameroon	1997–8	–	46–51	24–27
Central African Republic	1998–9	99	82	–
Eritrea	1995	84–97	23	24–27
The Gambia	1998–9	–	29–32	5
Kenya	1997–8	–	68	35
Mali	1991–7	93	43	–
Morocco	1991–7	99	26	–
South Africa	1999	–	53	17
Tanzania	1992	–	42	19
Uganda	1989–93	91	71	36
Zambia	1997–8	–	55	36
Zimbabwe	1993–8	–	67	36-53
Asia
Bangladesh	1996–8	46^{#}	8–14	–
China	1987–95	–	18–29	17
Israel	1998–9	70	5	4
Japan	1985–93	50–60	1–17	2
Jordan	<2000	–	41	53
South Korea	2004	–	28	22
Philippines	1991–3	–	9	–
Syria	1995–8	80–100	0	0–1
Thailand	1991–7	51	35	15
Turkey	1991–2	97	42	–
Australasia
Australia	<1992–8	79–80	11–15	-
New Zealand	1993–8	–	4–15	3–7
Central/South America
Brazil	1990–7	–	23–42	–
Colombia	1985-97	89	57	-
Costa Rica	1984–5	–	39	–
Haiti	<1992	–	54	–
Peru	1991–7	92	36	–
Europe
Bulgaria	1999	84	15->40	15-30
Denmark	1986	76	31	–
Finland	1966–89	–	26–31	–
Germany	1996–7	87	15	11
Greenland	1986	98	68	–
Italy	1981–8	81–93	1–5	0–5
Norway	1992–4	79	27	–
Spain	1992–3	79	4	4
Sweden	1989–93	41^{#}	21–33	–
Switzerland	1997	65–87	22	11
UK	1984–95	69–78	5	3
North America
Canada	1999	57	13	–
Mexico	1992–7	–	30	–
United States	1988–94	68*	26*	18*
^{#} in children
^{*} Ages 12-70

== Europe ==
Large differences in HSV-1 seroprevalence are seen in different European countries. HSV-1 seroprevalence is high in Bulgaria (83.9%) and the Czech Republic (80.6%), and lower in Belgium (67.4%), The Netherlands (56.7%), and Finland (52.4%).

The typical age at which HSV-1 infection is acquired ranges from 5 to 9 years in Central and Eastern European countries like Bulgaria and the Czech Republic, to over 25 years of age in Northern European countries such as Finland, The Netherlands, Germany, and England and Wales. Young adults in Northern European countries are less likely to be infected with HSV-1. European women are more likely to be HSV-1 seropositive than men.

HSV-2 seropositivity is widely distributed in Europeans older than 12, although there are large differences in the percentage of the population exposed to HSV-2. Bulgaria has a high (23.9%) HSV-2 seroprevalence relative to other European countries: Germany (13.9%), Finland (13.4%), Belgium (11.1%), The Netherlands (8.8%), the Czech Republic (6.0%), and England and Wales (4.2%).

Women are more likely to be seropositive than men, and likely acquire the virus at an earlier age. In each country of Europe, HSV-2 seropositivity becomes more common from adolescence onwards and increases in the population with age, with a decline in the older age groups in some countries.

== North America ==
=== United States ===
The most recent data for HSV-2 was published in March 2010, based on a National Health and Nutrition Examination Survey study performed between 2005 and 2013 by CDC. About 1 in 6 Americans (16.2%) aged 14 to 49 is infected with HSV-2. HSV-2 prevalence was nearly twice as high among women (20.9%) than men (11.5%), and was more than three times higher among blacks (39.2%) than non-Hispanic whites (12.3%).

The most affected group was black women, with a prevalence rate of 48%. Prevalence increased with age and number of partners. Only 18.9% of those infected had previously been aware of their infection.

2005–2008 HSV-2 study by demographic
Demographic	HSV-2 Seroprevalence	(Females)	(Males)
Gender	16.2%	20.9%	11.5%
Age: 14–19 yrs	1.4%	2.1%	0.8%
Age: 20–29 yrs	10.5%	14.4%	6.6%
Age: 30–39 yrs	19.6%	25.2%	13.9%
Age: 40–49 yrs	26.1%	32.3%	19.6%
Ethnicity: White, non-Hispanic	12.3%	15.9%	8.7%
Ethnicity: Black, non-Hispanic	39.2%	48.0%	29.0%
Ethnicity: Mexican American	10.1%	13.2%	7.5%
1 lifetime sex partner	3.9%	5.4%	1.7%
2–4 lifetime sex partners	14.0%	18.8%	7.3%
5–9 lifetime sex partners	16.3%	21.8%	10.1%
>10 lifetime sex partners	26.7%	37.1%	19.1%

African Americans and immigrants from developing countries typically have an HSV-1 seroprevalance in their adolescent population that is two or three times higher than that of Caucasian Americans. Many white Americans become sexually active while seronegative for HSV-1. The absence of antibodies from a prior oral HSV-1 infection leaves these individuals susceptible to herpes whitlow, herpes gladiatorum, and HSV-1 genital infection. Primary genital infection brings with it the risk of vertical transmission to the neonate, and is highest if the mother contracts a primary infection during the third trimester of pregnancy. In the U.S. the number of genital infections caused by HSV-1 is now thought to be about 50% of first episodes of genital infection.

In healthy adults, HSV-2 infection occurs more frequently in the United States than in Europe.

Seroprevalence rates in the United States appeared to be increasing, rising from 16.4% in 1976 to 21.8% in 1994. However, this trend seems to have reversed itself in recent years, dropping to 17.2% in 2004.

The current prevalence of genital herpes caused by HSV-2 in the U.S. is roughly one in four or five adults, with approximately 50 million people infected with genital herpes and an estimated 0.5 million new genital herpes infections occurring each year. African Americans appear more susceptible to HSV-2, although the presence of active genital symptoms is more likely in Caucasian Americans. The largest increase in HSV-2 acquisition during the past few years is in white adolescents. People with many lifetime sexual partners and those who are sexually active from a young age are also at higher-risk for the transmission of HSV-2 in the U.S.

Due to the anatomical nature of the vagina women are at higher risk than men for acquiring HSV-2 infection, and the chance of being infected increases with age. This is evident despite women on average having a lower number of sexual partners. As of 2022, The CDC reports that 48% of African American women and 46% of African American males in the United States are infected with the HSV-2 virus.

=== Canada ===
According to a study in Ontario, of people between the ages of 15 and 16, 26.9% of men, 32% of non-pregnant women, and 55% of pregnant women tested positive for HSV-1 antibodies. Between the ages of 40 and 44, 54.7% of men, 88.7% of women, and 69.2% of pregnant women tested positive for HSV-1 antibodies. The overall age-gender standardized seroprevalence for HSV-1 antibodies was 51.1%. Teenagers are less likely to be seropositive for HSV-2—antibodies against this virus are only found in 0–3.8% of 15- and 16-year-olds. However, 21% of individuals in their early forties have antibodies against HSV-2, reflecting the sexually transmitted nature of this virus. When standardising for age, HSV-2 seroprevalence in Ontario for individuals between the ages of 15 and 44 was 9.1%. Rates for Canadian people infected with HSV-2 is much lower than estimated levels of HSV-2 seroprevalence in people of a similar age range in the United States.

HSV-2 seroprevalence in pregnant women between the ages of 15 and 44 in British Columbia is similar, with 57% having antibodies for HSV-1 and 13% having antibodies for HSV-2. In British Columbia in 1999, the seroprevalence of HSV-2 antibody in leftover serum submitted for antenatal testing revealed a prevalence of 17.3%, ranging from 7.1% in women 15–19 years old to 28.2% in those 40–44 years. • In attendees at an Alberta sexually transmitted infection (STI) clinic in 1994 and 1995, the seroprevalence of HSV-1 and -2 in leftover sera was 56% and 19%, respectively. In Nova Scotia, 58.1% of 1,790 HSV isolates from genital lesion cultures in women were HSV-1; in men, 36.7% of 468 isolates were HSV-1

== Africa ==
=== Sub-Saharan Africa ===
HSV-2 is more common in Sub-Saharan Africa than in Europe or the North America. Up to 82% of women and 53% of men in Sub-Saharan Africa are seropositive for HSV-2. These are the highest levels of HSV-2 infection in the world, although exact levels vary from country to country in this continent.

In most African countries, HSV-2 prevalence increases with age. However, age-associated decreases in HSV-2 seroprevalence has been observed for women in Uganda and Zambia, and in men in Ethiopia, Benin, and Uganda.

=== Northern Africa ===
Genital herpes appears less common in Northern Africa compared to Sub-Saharan Africa. For example, only 26% of middle-aged women have antibodies for HSV-2 in Morocco. Women are more likely to be infected with HSV-2 once they are over the age of 40.

Children in Egypt with acute lymphoblastic leukemia are often infected with HSV from a young age—HSV-1 or HSV-2 antibodies are present in an estimated 54% of children under the age of 5, and 77% in children over 10 years of age. Algerian children are also likely to acquire HSV-1 infection at a young age (under 6) and 81.25% of the population has antibodies to HSV-1 by the age of 15.

== Central and South America ==
Relative to rates in Europe and North America, HSV-2 seroprevalence is high in Central and South America. Infection levels are estimated at 20% to 60%. During the mid-1980s, HSV-2 prevalence was 33% in 25- to 29-year-old women and 45% in those aged 40 and over in Costa Rica. In the early 1990s HSV-2 prevalence was approximately 45% among women over 60 in Mexico.

The highest HSV-2 prevalence in Central or South America—60%—has been found in Colombian middle-aged women, although similar HSV-2 prevalence has been observed in younger women in Haiti (54%). HSV-2 infects about 30% of women over 30 years old in Colombia, Costa Rica, Mexico, and Panama. HSV-2 antibodies were found in more than 41% of women of childbearing age in Brazil.

However, no increase in seroprevalence was associated with age in women over 40 years old in Brazil—HSV-2 prevalence was estimated at 50% among women aged 40–49, 33% among women 50–59, and 42% among women over 60. Women in Brazil are more likely to acquire an HSV-2 infection if their male partners had history of anal sex and had many sexual partners in his lifetime. In Peru, HSV-2 prevalence is also high among women in their 30s but is lower in men.

== Asia ==
=== Eastern and South East Asia ===
HSV-1 seroprevalence in some Asian countries is low, relative to other countries worldwide, with only 51% women in Thailand, and between 50 and 60% in Japan possessing antibodies. HSV-2 seroprevalence in developing Asian countries is comparable (10–30%) to that observed in North America and Northern Europe. However, estimates of HSV-2 infectivity in Thailand are higher than observed in other Eastern Asian countries; total HSV-2 seroprevalence is approximately 37% in this country. HSV-2 seroprevalence is low in women in the Philippines (9%), although commencing activity while young is associated with an increase risk of acquiring HSV-2 infection; woman starting sexual activity by the time they reach 17 are seven times more likely to be HSV-2 seropositive than those starting sexual activity when over 21.

In South Korea, incidence of HSV-2 infection in those under the age of 20 is low, only 2.7% in men and 3.0% in women. Seroprevalence levels increase in older South Koreans however, such that the population over 20 that has antibodies against HSV-2 is 21.7% of men and 28% of women.

=== Southern Asia ===
In India 63% of individuals were seropositive in 2005, within this figure, 33.3% were positive for HSV-1 and 16.6% are seropositive for HSV-2. Those with both HSV-1 and HSV-2 antibodies are estimated at 13.3% of the population. Indian men are more likely to be infected with HSV-2 than women, and increasing seroprevalence of this virus is associated with an increasing age.

=== West Asia ===
Turkey— High levels of HSV-1 (97%) and HSV-2 (42%) were found amongst pregnant women in the city of Erzurum in Eastern Anatolia Region, Turkey. In Istanbul however, lower HSV-2 seroprevalence was observed; HSV-2 antibodies were found in 4.8% of sexually active adults, while HSV-1 antibodies were found in 85.3%. Only 5% of pregnant women were infected with HSV-2, and 98% were infected with HSV-1. Prevalence of these viruses was higher in sex workers of Istanbul, reaching levels of 99% and 60% for HSV-1 and HSV-2 prevalence respectively.

Jordan— The prevalence of HSV-2 in Jordan is 52.8% for men and 41.5% for women.

Israel— HSV-1 seroprevalence is 59.8% in the population of Israel and increases with age in both genders but the adolescent seroprevalence has been declining as in most industrialized nations. An estimated 9.2% of Israeli adults are infected with HSV-2. Infection of either HSV-1 or HSV-2 is higher in females; HSV-2 seroprevalence reaches 20.5% in females in their 40s. These values are similar to levels in HSV infection in Europe.

Antibodies for HSV-1 or HSV-2 are also more likely to be found individuals born outside of Israel, and individuals residing in Jerusalem and Southern Israel; people of Jewish origin living in Israel are less likely to possess antibodies against herpes. Among pregnant women in Israel a small scale cross sectional study found the prevalence of HSV-2 infection was 13.3% and that of HSV-1 was 94.9%. The HSV-2 infection rate was 3-fold higher among immigrants from the former Soviet Union (27.5%) than among Israeli-born Jewish and Arab women (9%). Approximately 78% of HSV-2 infections in Israel are asymptomatic. HSV-1 causes 66.3% of genital herpes in the Tel Aviv area.

Syria— Genital herpes infection from HSV-2 is predicted to be low in Syria although HSV-1 levels are high. HSV-1 infections is common (95%) among healthy Syrians over the age of 30, while HSV-2 prevalence is low in healthy individuals (0.15%), and persons infected with other sexually transmitted diseases (9.5%). High risk groups for acquiring HSV-2 in Syria, include prostitutes and bar girls; they have 34% and 20% seroprevalence respectively.

== Oceania ==
In Australia, a study using data from 1999 revealed the seroprevalence of HSV-1 was at 76.5%, with significant differences associated with age, gender and Indigenous status, which were not specified. An estimated 12% of Australian adults were seropositive for HSV-2, with higher prevalence in women (16%) than in men (8%). Larger cities had higher HSV-2 seroprevalence (13%) than rural populations (9%). Higher prevalence was found in Indigenous Australians (18%) than non-Indigenous Australians (12%).

As in the U.S., HSV-1 is increasingly identified as the cause of genital herpes in Australians; HSV-1 was identified in the anogenital area of only 3% of the population in 1980, but had risen to 41% in 2001. This was most common in females and persons under 25. The number of genital herpes infections appears to be rising in New Zealand with three times more cases in 1993 compared to 1977. In this country, HSV-2 affects 60% more women than men of similar age.
