= BK virus =

Member of the polyomavirus family

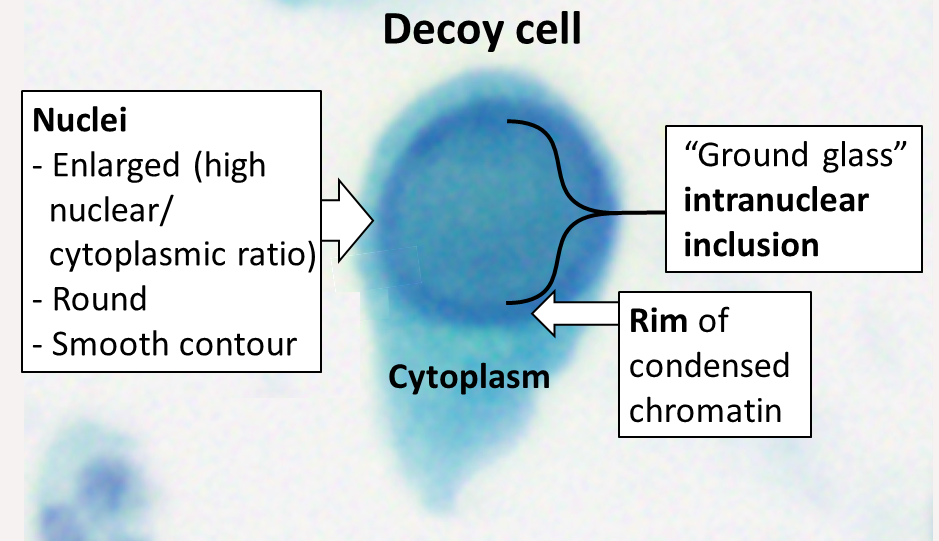
- Cytology of a polyomavirus infected cell, using Papanicolaou stain. The high nuclear to cytoplasmic ratio makes it resemble cancer (thus the name "decoy cell") but the inclusion body reveals its viral pathophysiology.
- Specialty: Infectious disease

The BK virus, also known as Human polyomavirus 1, is a member of the polyomavirus family. Past infection with the BK virus is widespread, but significant consequences of infection are uncommon, with the exception of the immunocompromised and the immunosuppressed. BK virus is an abbreviation of the name of the first patient, from whom the virus was isolated in 1971. This patient - a male - was then 39 years old, who had developed constriction of the ureter after a kidney transplant.

== Signs and symptoms ==
The BK virus rarely causes disease but is typically associated with patients who have had a kidney transplant; many people who are infected with this virus are asymptomatic. If symptoms do appear, they tend to be mild: respiratory infection or fever. These are known as primary BK infections. Although without any clinical symptoms, footprints of BK virus have been detected in specimens from females affected by spontaneous abortion. Serum antibodies against BK virus have also been found in spontaneous abortion affected women as well as in women who underwent voluntary interruption of pregnancy.

The virus then disseminates to the kidneys and urinary tract where it persists for the life of the individual. It is thought that up to 80% of the population contains a latent form of this virus, which remains latent until the body undergoes some form of immunosuppression. Typically, this is in the setting of kidney transplantation or multi-organ transplantation. Presentation in these immunocompromised individuals is much more severe. Clinical manifestations include renal dysfunction (seen by a progressive rise in serum creatinine), and an abnormal urinalysis revealing renal tubular cells and inflammatory cells.

== Cause ==
BK virus

Virus classification
- (unranked): Virus
- Realm: Floreoviria
- Kingdom: Shotokuvirae
- Phylum: Cossaviricota
- Class: Papovaviricetes
- Order: Sepolyvirales
- Family: Polyomaviridae
- Genus: Betapolyomavirus
- Species: Betapolyomavirus hominis

Synonyms
- BK polyomavirus; Human polyomavirus 1

=== Transmission ===
It is not known how this virus is transmitted, except that it spreads from person to person, and not from an animal source. It has been suggested that this virus may be transmitted through respiratory fluids or urine, since infected individuals periodically excrete virus in the urine. A survey of 400 healthy blood donors was reported as showing that 82% were positive for IgG against BK virus.

=== Risk factors ===
In some kidney transplant patients, the necessary use of immunosuppressive drugs has the side-effect of allowing the virus to replicate within the graft, a disease called BK nephropathy. From 1–10% of renal transplant patients progress to BK virus associated nephropathy (BKVAN) and up to 80% of these patients lose their grafts. The onset of nephritis can occur as early as several days post-transplant to as late as 5 years.

It is also associated with ureteral stenosis and interstitial nephritis. In bone marrow transplant recipients it is notable as a cause for hemorrhagic cystitis.

BK viremia load > 185 000 copies/ml at the time of first positive BKV diagnosis – to be the strongest predictor for BKVAN (97% specificity and 75% sensitivity). In addition the BKV peak viral loads in blood reaching 223 000 copies/ml at any time was found to be predictive for BKVAN (91% specificity and 88% sensitivity). The monitoring for BK viremia and BK virurea should be started immediately after transplantation. This helps in reduction of immunosuppression at the earliest possible time - a good preventive measure for BKVAN.

== Diagnosis ==
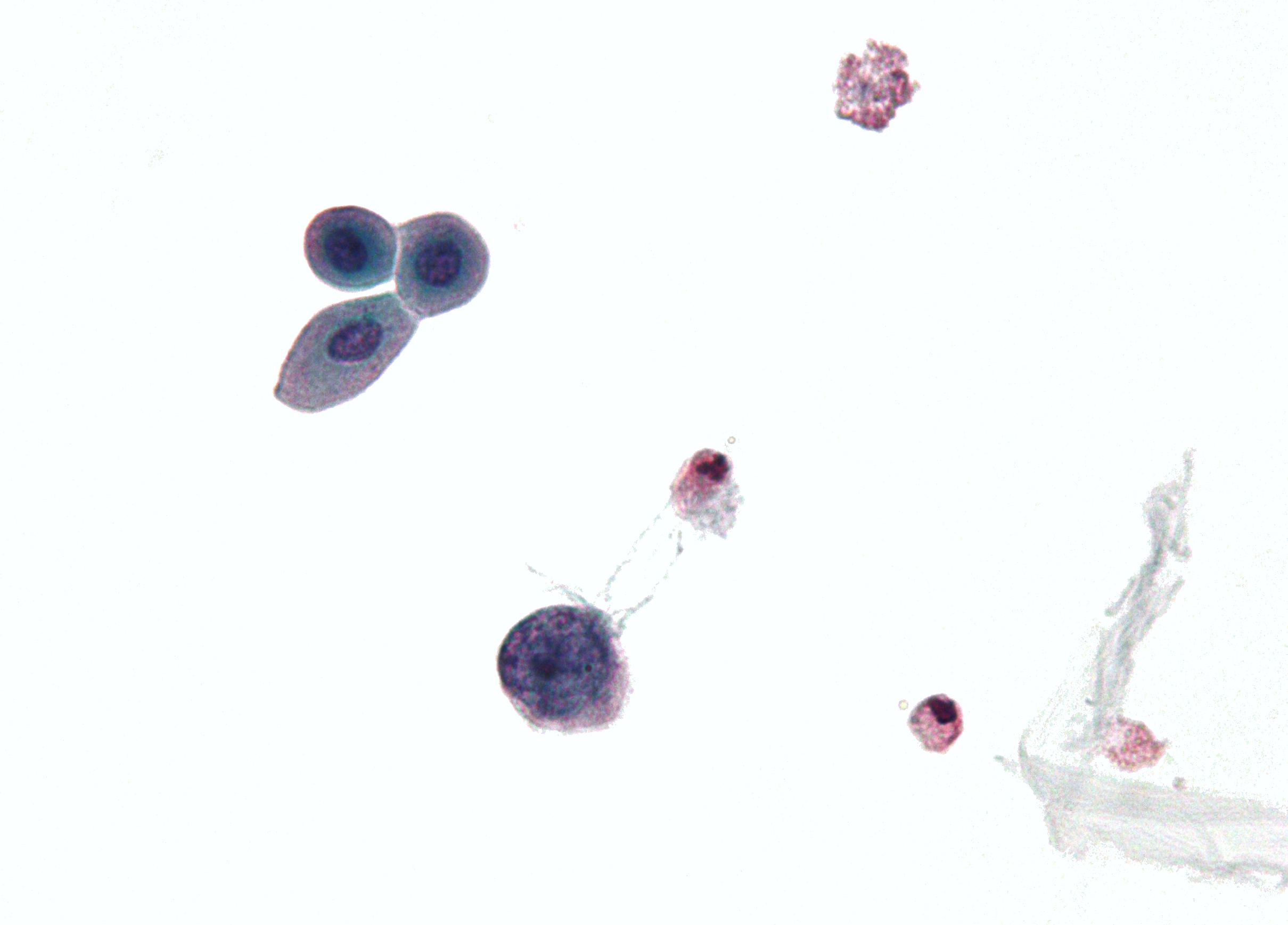
Micrograph showing a polyomavirus infected cell – large (blue) cell below-center-left. Urine cytology specimen.

This virus can be diagnosed by a BKV blood test or a urine test for decoy cells, in addition to carrying out a biopsy in the kidneys. PCR techniques are often carried out to identify the virus.

== Treatment ==
The cornerstone of therapy is reduction in immunosuppression. A recent surge in BKVAN correlates with use of potent immunosuppressant drugs, such as tacrolimus and mycophenolate mofetil (MMF). Studies have not shown any correlation between BKVAN and a single immunosuppressive agent but rather the overall immunosuppressive load.

- No guidelines or drug levels and doses exist for proper reduction of immunosuppressants in BKVAN
- Most common methods:
  1. Withdrawal of MMF or tacrolimus
  2. Replacement of tacrolimus by cyclosporine
  3. Overall reduction of immunosuppressive load
  4. Some cyclosporine trough levels reported to be reduced to 100–150 ng/ml and tacrolimus levels reduced to 3–5 ng/ml
- Retrospective analysis of 67 patients concluded graft survival was similar between reduction and discontinuation of agents.
- Single center study showed renal allografts were preserved in 8/8 individuals managed with reduction in immunosuppression while graft loss occurred in 8/12 patients treated with an increase in therapy for what was thought to be organ rejection.

=== Antivirals ===
==== Leflunomide ====
Leflunomide, a pyrimidine synthesis inhibitor is (since 2006) generally accepted as the second treatment option behind reduction of immunosuppression.

The rationale behind using leflunomide in BKVAN comes from its combined immunosuppressive and antiviral properties. Two studies consisting of 26 and 17 patients who developed BKVAN on a three-drug regimen of tacrolimus, MMF, and steroids had their MMF replaced with leflunomide 20–60 mg daily. 84 and 88% of patients, respectively had clearance or a progressive reduction in viral load and a stabilization or improvement of graft function (7). In a study conducted by Teschner et al. in 2009, 12/13 patients who had their MMF exchanged with leflunomide cleared the virus by 109 days. In a case series, there was improvement or stabilization in 23/26 patients with BKVAN after switching MMF to leflunomide.

There are no dosing guidelines for leflunomide in BKVAN. Patient to patient variability has made dosing and monitoring of leflunomide extremely difficult.

- Study of 26 and 17 patients were dosed between 20 mg/day and 60 mg/day with trough levels of 50—100 μg/ml. Failure was seen in patients with leflunomide plasma levels < 40 μg/ml.
- One study of 21 patients found that low levels (< 40 μg/ml) and high levels (> 40 μg/ml) had similar effects on the rate of viral clearance. Those with higher levels had more adverse events (hematologic, hepatic).
- In the study by Teschner et al., dosages and drug concentration showed no correlation with substantial variation from person to person. Low drug concentrations were associated with decrease in viral load. This makes it difficult to determine whether or not reduction of viral load or addition of leflunomide was the cause for viral clearance.

A 2020 systematic analysis finds that the evidence is limited to case series and prospective observational studies.

==== Other options ====
Some case series report success with cidofovir without apparent nephrotoxicity. Nephrotoxicity is a major concern for this drug.

IVIG is expensive, nephrotoxic (due to osmosis) and requires hospitalization for infusion. It is nevertheless routinely used in transplant patients in the hope of managing immunosuppression. Some patients who underwent reduction of immunosuppresants and infusion of IVIG recovered, but it is impossible to tell whether IVIG played a role.

Mixed results were seen with fluoroquinolone antibiotics. They are cheap and comparatively safe, but evidence does not support a recommendation either for or against its use.

Adoptive cell transfer of virus-specific CD4 and CD8 T cells is said to be safe and effective in one clinical trial. The T cells can be made from the patient's own bone marrow stem cells or from a different donor's. Allogeneic CD4 T Cells appear useful in increasing the activity of BK virus-specific CD8 T cells in one study.

== History ==
The BK virus was first isolated in 1971 from the urine of a renal transplant patient, initials B.K. The BK virus is similar to another virus called the JC virus (JCV), since their genomes share 75% sequence similarity. Both of these viruses can be identified and differentiated from each other by carrying out serological tests using specific antibodies or by using a PCR-based genotyping approach.

== Virology ==
=== Virus structure ===
Similarly to JC virus and SV40, BK virus has a small, non-enveloped, icosahedral capsid with a diameter of 45–50 nm. The capsid is made up of viral proteins VP1, VP2, and VP3. The capsid proteins have T=7 arrangement. The icosahedral structure contains 72 pentamers of the major capsid protein VP1, 360 molecules in total. Each penton is bound the minor capsid proteins VP2 or VP3 on the inside of the virus while VP1 protein shell is on the outside.

=== Genome ===
BKV genome is approximately 5,000bp long and can vary depending on non-coding control region.The genome is compacted by cellular histone proteins H2A, H2B, H3 and H4, forming a structure termed "minichromosome" due to being chromatin-like.

The genome is divided into early coding region, late coding region and non-coding control region (NCCR). Transcription from ORI site produces mRNA coding the early, functional proteins, known as small and large T antigens, (sTAg and LTAg). These proteins function in viral DNA replication and cell cycle progression, by promoting S phase in the host cell. The late transcript codes for structural proteins VP1, VP2, and VP3 and functional protein known as agnoprotein.

==== Archetype and rearranged virus forms ====
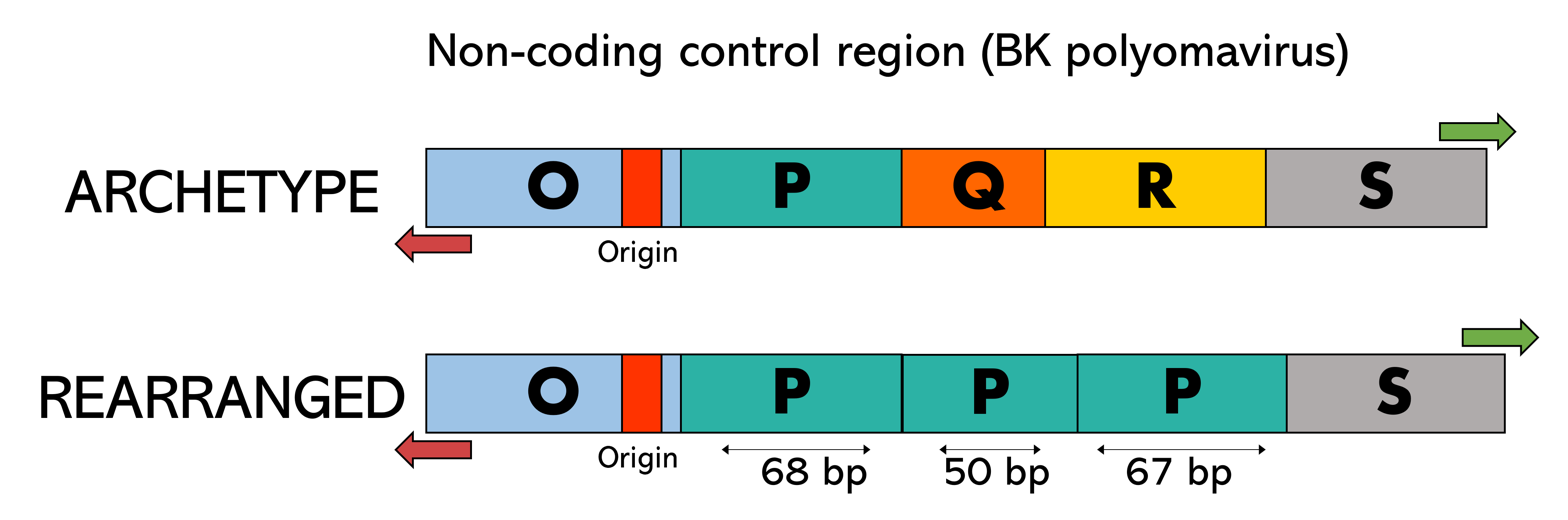
Different viral forms based on NCCR sequence variant (archetype or rearranged). The NCCR contains O,P,Q,R,S blocks and their variations.

Non-coding control region (NCCR) is prone to variation by DNA rearrangements. The most common and transmissible (wild-type) form based on NCCR region is called Archetype and has five sequence blocks (O-P-Q-R-S). Rearranged virus can have deletions, insertions or other types of mutations that lead to variation in the P-Q-R-S blocks. Some viruses can have deletions and insertions of several blocks, as is the case with the Dunlop strain (O-P-P-P-S).

Rearrangement of archetype frequently arises in cell cultures and in patients. Certain rearranged variants can lead to much higher viral replication compared to archetype. This is thought to be due to enhanced promoter activity and high levels of early mRNA expression.

==== Genotypes and subtypes ====
Based on DNA sequence variation, BKV is categorized into four genotypes (I, II, III, IV) which are further divided into subtypes (Ia, Ib1, Ib2, Ic, and IVa1, IVa2, IVb1, IVb2, IVc1, IVc2). Genotype I is found worldwide, while other genotypes are geographically distributed.

=== Replication cycle ===
BK virus enters the host cells by caveolae-mediated endocytic pathway. The viral protein VP1 binds to α2-8-linked disialic acid motifs on gangliosides GD1b and GT1b on cell membranes. After caveola-mediated endocytosis, the virus capsid is uncoated while VP2 and VP3 mediate the entry of BKV into the nucleus. BKV genome is episomal and does not integrate into host DNA under normal conditions.

The early coding region is transcribed first to make functional proteins LTAg and sTAg. These proteins accumulate in the nucleus and facilitate the replication of viral DNA. LTAg binds to the late coding region, acting as a helicase to facilitate the transcription of proteins coded on the late region. The capsid proteins VP1-3 are produced in the cytoplasm and later recruited to the nucleus in order to assemble new virus particles.

One additional transmission and uptake route between cells is via extracellular vesicles. The virus can transfer viral components or even infectious particles between cells using cellular secretory system by utilizing extracellular vesicles.

=== Tissue tropism ===
BK virus has a wide spectrum of tissue and cell type tropism. The virus is detected in urinary tract system, salivary gland cells, peripheral blood leukocytes, pancreatic cells, vascular endothelial cells. BKV has been identified in upper respiratory tract and tonsils as well as in fetus cells.

=== Viral latency ===
BK virus infection is self-limiting and is known to establish lifelong latent infection in the urinary system. The mechanism of how the virus establishes latency is not fully understood. Therefore, it is not known if BKV stays latent in the cells or maintains low level replication with persistent infection. The viral ability to establish latency in renal tubule or urothelium cells in healthy hosts can be detrimental in immunocompromised host due to viral reactivation. Viral reactivation is common in kidney transplant recipients, hematopoietic stem cell transplantation recipients and HIV/AIDS patients.

Most often, the persistent infection is explained by innate and adaptive immune regulation. Another mechanism on how the virus can be self-limiting is by using microRNA and targeting the DNA sequence of the functional protein Large T antigen. This miRNA is transcribed during the late viral phase and is believed to effectively limit the archetype virus form. Additionally, both agnoprotein and small T antigen can have a role in latency by impairing the innate immune signalling. Specifically, agnoprotein is known to impair IRF3 nuclear translocation and induce mitochondrial fragmentation. Small T antigen can interact with a cellular enzyme protein phosphatase 2A which interferes with cell cycle progression.

== See also ==
- BK polyomavirus-associated diseases
- JC polyomavirus
- Decoy cells
