= Vaccine contamination with SV40 =

1955–1961 vaccine controversy

Vaccine contamination with simian vacuolating virus 40, known as SV40, occurred in the United States and other countries between 1955 and 1961.

SV40 is a monkey virus that has the potential to cause cancer in animals, although this is considered unlikely and there have been no known human cases. Soon after its discovery, SV40 was identified in early batches of the oral form of the polio vaccine. The vaccines in which SV40 was found were produced between 1955 and 1961 by Lederle (now a subsidiary of Wyeth). The contamination may have been in the original seed strain (coded SOM) or in the substrate—primary kidney cells from infected monkeys that were used to grow the vaccine virus during production.

Both the Sabin vaccine (oral, live virus) and the Salk vaccine (injectable, killed virus) were affected; the technique used to inactivate the polio virus in the Salk vaccine, by means of formaldehyde, did not reliably kill SV40. The contaminated vaccine continued to be distributed to the public through 1963.

It was difficult to detect small quantities of virus until the advent of the polymerase chain reaction (PCR); since then, stored samples of vaccine made after 1962 have tested negative for SV40. In 1997, Herbert Ratner of Oak Park, Illinois, gave some vials of the 1955 Salk vaccine to researcher Michele Carbone. Ratner, the Health Commissioner of Oak Park at the time the Salk vaccine was introduced, had kept these vials of vaccine in a refrigerator for over forty years. Upon testing this vaccine, Carbone discovered that it contained not only the SV40 strain already known to have been in the Salk vaccine (containing two 72-bp enhancers) but also the same slow-growing SV40 strain currently found in some malignant tumors and lymphomas (containing one 72-bp enhancer). It is unknown how widespread the virus was among humans before the 1950s, though one study found that 12% of a sample of German medical students in 1952 – prior to the advent of the vaccines – had SV40 antibodies.

An analysis presented at the Vaccine Cell Substrate Conference in 2004 suggested that vaccines used in the former Soviet bloc countries, China, Japan, and Africa, could have been contaminated up to 1980, meaning that hundreds of millions more could have been exposed to the virus unknowingly.

Population level studies show no evidence of any increase in cancer incidence as a result of exposure, though SV40 has been extensively studied.

== See also ==
- Bundaberg tragedy, deaths of 12 children following bacterial contamination of diphtheria vaccine
