= Human lung microvascular endothelial cell =

HLMVECs are cells derived from the pulmonary endothelium

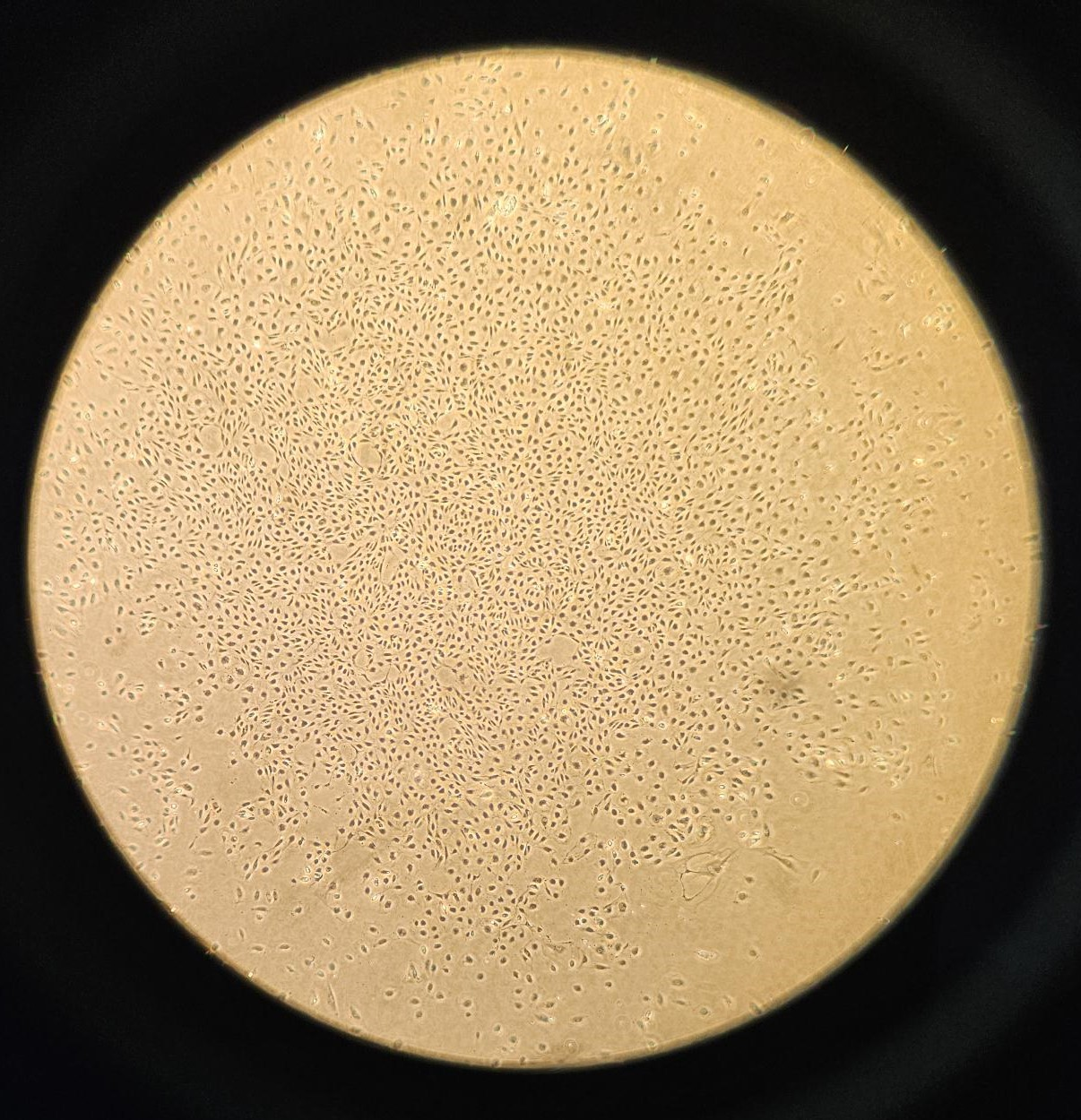
Human lung microvascular endothelial cells (HLMVECs) pictured down a microscope at 200x zoom

Human lung microvascular endothelial cells (HLMVECs) are cells derived from the pulmonary endothelium. HLMVECs are used as a laboratory model system for the study of the function and pathology of the pulmonary endothelium to research conditions such as ARDS HLMVECs are used due to their simple techniques for isolating them from adult lungs and their ability to easily proliferate in a laboratory setting. When fully confluent they exhibit a cobblestone phenotype just as they do when lining vessel walls.
