= SV40 large T antigen =

Proto-oncogene derived from polyomavirus SV40

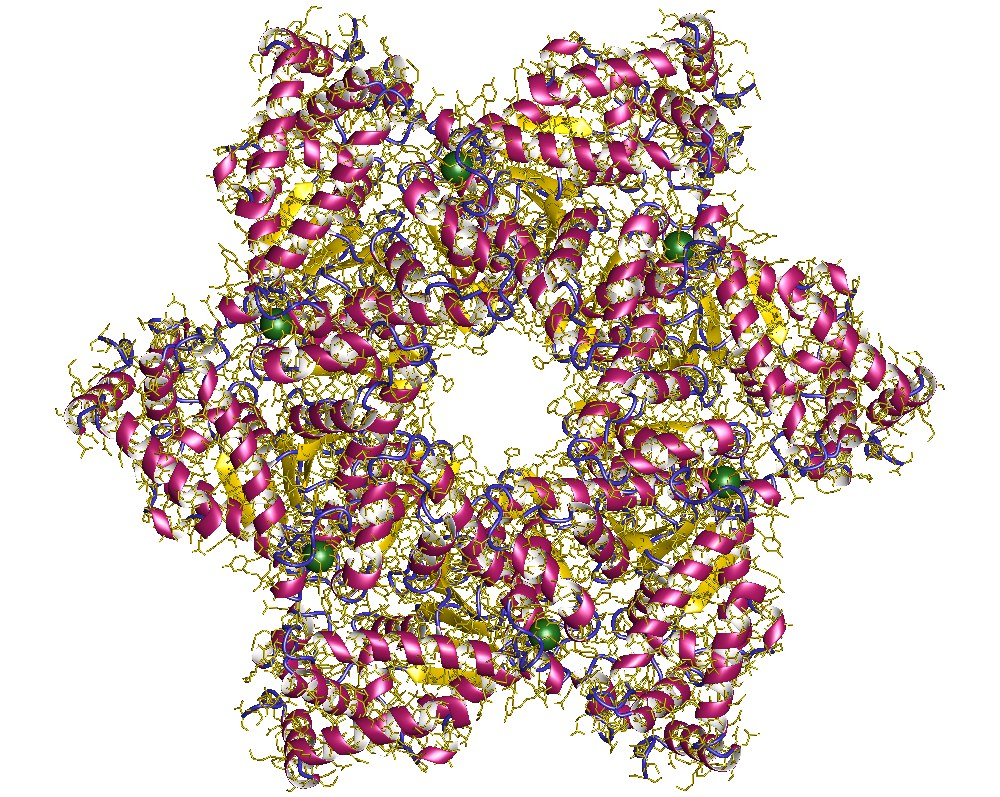
- SV40 T helicase domain hexamer, Simian virus.

Identifiers
- Organism: Simian virus 40
- Symbol: ?
- UniProt: P03070
Search for
- Structures: Swiss-model
- Domains: InterPro

SV40 large T antigen (Simian virus 40 TAg) is a hexamer protein that is a dominant-acting oncoprotein derived from the polyomavirus SV40. TAg is capable of inducing malignant transformation of a variety of cell types. The transforming activity of TAg is due in large part to its perturbation of the retinoblastoma (pRb) and p53 tumor suppressor proteins. In addition, TAg binds to several other cellular factors, including the transcriptional co-activators p300 and CBP, which may contribute to its transformation function. Similar proteins from related viruses are known as large tumor antigen in general.

TAg is a product of an early gene transcribed during viral infection by SV40, and is involved in viral genome replication and regulation of host cell cycle. SV40 is a double-stranded, circular DNA virus belonging to the Polyomaviridae (earlier Papovavirus) family, Orthopolyomavirus genus. Polyomaviruses infect a wide variety of vertebrates and cause solid tumours at multiple sites. SV40 was isolated by Ben Sweet and Maurice Hilleman in 1960 in primary monkey kidney cell cultures being used to grow Sabin oral polio vaccine.

== Domains ==
The TAg has a CUL7-binding domain, a TP53-binding domain, a Zinc finger, and a Superfamily 3 ATPase/Helicase domain. It has two motifs, one for nuclear localization signal, the other being the LXCXE motif.

== Mechanism ==
After entering the cell, the viral genes are transcribed by host cell RNA polymerase II to produce early mRNAs. Because of the relative simplicity of the genome, polyomaviruses are completely dependent on the cell for transcription and genome replication. The cis-acting regulatory element surrounding the origin of replication directs transcription, and T-antigen directs transcription and replication.

SV40 DNA replication is initiated by binding of large T-antigen to the origin region of the genome. The function of T-antigen is controlled by phosphorylation, which attenuates the binding to the SV40 origin. Protein-protein interactions between T-antigen and DNA polymerase-alpha directly stimulate replication of the virus genome.

T-antigen also binds and inactivates tumor suppressor proteins (p53, p105-Rb). This causes the cells to leave G1 phase and enter into S phase, which promotes DNA replication.

The SV40 genome is very small and does not encode all the information necessary for DNA replication. Therefore, it is essential for the host cell to enter S phase, when cell DNA and the viral genome are replicated together. Therefore, in addition to increasing transcription, another function of T-antigen is to alter the cellular environment to permit virus genome replication.

== Nuclear localization signal ==
The SV40 large T-antigen has been used as a model protein to study nuclear localization signals (NLSs). It is imported into the nucleus by its interaction with importin α. The NLS sequence is PKKKRKV.

== Interaction with pRb via the LXCXE motif ==
SV40 large TAg, other polyomavirus large T antigens, adenovirus E1a proteins, and oncogenic human papillomavirus E7 proteins share a structural motif that encodes a high-affinity pRb-binding domain. A diagnostic pattern for a high-affinity pRb-binding domain was refined using an artificial intelligence pattern-induction program running on a massively parallel supercomputer (Connection Machine-2). The motif is characterized by an Asp, Asn or Thr residue followed by three invariant amino acids, interspersed with non-conserved amino acids (designated by x, where x cannot be a Lys or Arg residue). A negatively charged region frequently follows carboxy-terminal to the pRb-binding domain.

{Asp/Asn/Thr} – Leu – x – Cys – x – Glu – x – ... {negatively charged region}

Hydrophobic and electrostatic properties are highly conserved in this motif. For example, a local hydrophobicity maximum occurs in the vicinity of the invariant Leu residue. A net negative charge occurs within 3 residues amino-terminal to the invariant Leu residue; furthermore, positively charged amino acids (Lys or Arg) are not found within the Leu – x – Cys – x – Glu sequence, nor in the positions immediately flanking this sequence. The pRb-binding motif and negatively charged region match to a segment of SV40 TAg beginning at residue 102 and ending at residue 115 as shown below:

– Asn – Leu – Phe – Cys – Ser – Glu – Glu – Met – Pro – Ser – Ser – Asp – Asp – Glu –

Functional studies of TAg proteins bearing mutations within this segment (amino acid positions 106 to 114, inclusive) demonstrate that certain deleterious mutations abolish malignant transforming activity. For example, mutation of the invariant Glu at position 107 to Lys-107 completely abolishes transforming activity. Deleterious mutations within this segment (amino acid positions 105 to 114, inclusive) also impair binding of the mutant TAg protein species to pRb, implying a correlation between transforming activity and the ability of TAg to bind pRb. A detailed computerized bioinformatics analysis, as well as an x-ray crystallography study, have demonstrated the biophysical basis for the interaction between this region of TAg and pRb. TAg residues 103 to 109 form an extended loop structure that binds tightly in a surface groove of pRb. In the crystal structure, Leu-103 is positioned so that it makes van der Waals contacts with the hydrophobic side chains of Val-714 and Leu-769 in pRb. A number of hydrogen bonds also stabilize the TAg–pRb complex. For example, the side chain of Glu-107 forms hydrogen bonds by accepting hydrogens from the main chain amide groups of Phe-721 and Lys-722 in pRb. The mutation of Glu-107 to Lys-107 is expected to result in loss of these hydrogen bonds. Furthermore, the side chain of Lys-107 would likely have energetically unfavorable interactions with the amide of Phe-721 or Lys-722, destabilizing the complex.

Strong experimental evidence confirms that positively charged amino acids (Lys or Arg) significantly weaken the binding interaction with pRB when positioned in the vicinity of the Leu – x – Cys – x – Glu sequence. This is likely due to the fact that the binding surface on pRb features six lysine residues, which will tend to repel positive residues within or flanking the Leu – x – Cys – x – Glu sequence.

Of note, the highest-risk oncogenic human papillomavirus (HPV) strains (16, 18, 31, 45) encode E7 proteins featuring high-affinity pRb-binding domains which match the diagnostic pattern given above.
