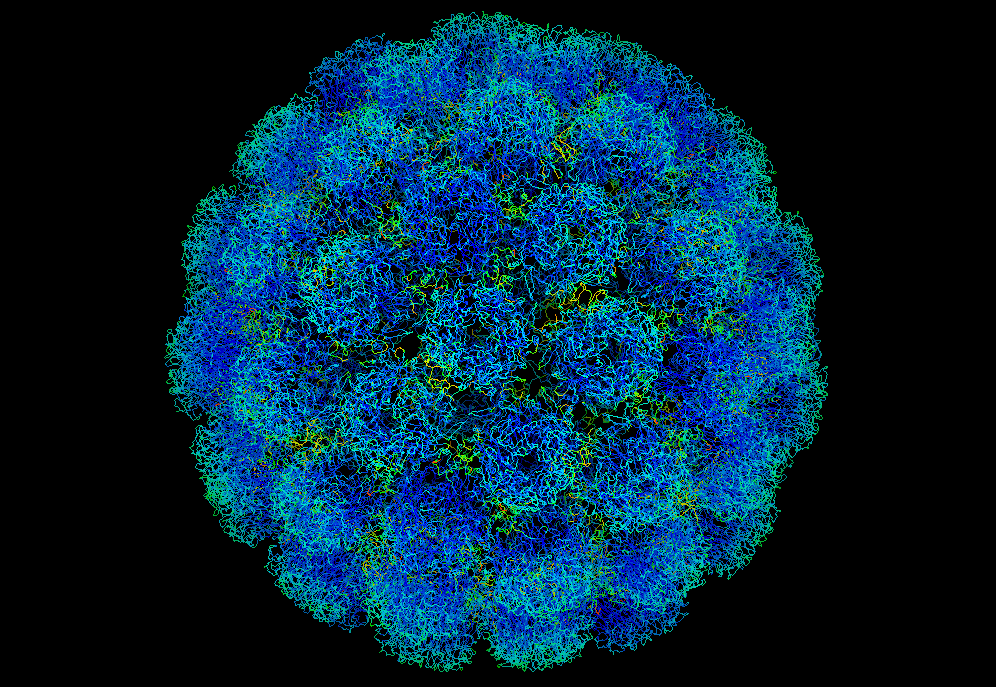

Virus classification
- (unranked): Virus
- Realm: Monodnaviria
- Kingdom: Shotokuvirae
- Phylum: Cossaviricota
- Class: Papovaviricetes
- Order: Sepolyvirales
- Family: Polyomaviridae
- Genus: Betapolyomavirus
- Species: Betapolyomavirus macacae
- Virus: Simian virus 40

Synonyms
- simian vacuolating virus 40, SV40

= SV40 =

Simian virus 40

Species of virus

SV40 is an abbreviation for simian vacuolating virus 40 or simian virus 40, a polyomavirus that is found in both monkeys and humans. Like other polyomaviruses, SV40 is a DNA virus that is found to cause tumors in humans and animals, but most often persists as a dormant infection. SV40 has been widely studied as a model eukaryotic virus, leading to many early discoveries in eukaryotic DNA replication and transcription.

== Human disease ==
The hypothesis that SV40 might cause cancer in humans was a particularly controversial area of research, fuelled by the historical contamination of some batches of polio vaccine with SV40 in the 1950s and 1960s. "Persuasive evidence now indicates that SV40 is causing infections in humans today and represents an emerging pathogen." However "It appears unlikely that SV40 infection alone is sufficient to cause human malignancy..."

=== p53 damage and carcinogenicity ===
It has been suggested that SV40 may act as a co-carcinogen with crocidolite asbestos to cause mesothelioma.

=== Polio vaccine contamination ===
Some vaccines made in the US between 1955 and 1961 were found to be contaminated with SV40, from the growth medium and from the original seed strain. Population level studies did not show extensive evidence of increase in cancer incidence as a result of exposure, though SV40 has been extensively studied. A thirty-five year follow-up did not find excess numbers of cancers associated with SV40.

== Gene therapy ==
Due to its high tissue tropism, biotechnology companies seek to utilize modified SV40 based vectors as a viral vector for gene therapy. In these helper dependent virus or packaging cell line assisted produced vectors the SV40 large T antigen and SV40 small T antigen are removed.

== Virology ==
SV40 consists of an unenveloped icosahedral virion with a closed circular double-stranded DNA genome of 5.2 kb. Structurally, SV40 is composed of 72 pentamers of major capsid protein VP1, with each VP1 pentamers harboring one minor capsid protein, either VP2 or VP3. The virion undergoes receptor-mediated endocytosis after binding to the ganglioside GM1 on the cell membrane. Penetration into the cell is through a caveolin vesicle. The endosome carrying SV40 fuses with the ER membrane to deliver the virus into the lumen of the ER. Resident ER proteins induce structural changes to initiate a disassembly process of the VP1 capsid shell. SV40 then exploits components of endoplasmic-reticulum-associated protein degradation machinery to penetrate the ER membrane and get extracted into the cytosol. A dynein motor complex adaptor, BICD2, disassembles the virion further, before components of the LINC complex target the virion to the nuclear membrane for subsequent entry. Inside the cell nucleus, the cellular RNA polymerase II acts to promote early gene expression. This results in an mRNA that is spliced into two segments. The small and large T antigens result from this. The large T antigen has two functions: 5% goes to the plasma cell membrane and 95% returns to the nucleus. Once in the nucleus the large T antigen binds three viral DNA sites, I, II and III. Binding of sites I and II autoregulates early RNA synthesis. Binding to site II takes place in each cell cycle. Binding site I initiates DNA replication at the origin of replication. Early transcription gives two spliced RNAs that are both 19s. Late transcription gives both a longer 16s, which synthesizes the major viral capsid protein VP1; and the smaller 19s, which gives VP2 and VP3 through leaky scanning. All of the proteins, besides the 5% of large T, return to the nucleus because assembly of the viral particle happens there. A putative late protein VP4 has been reported to act as a viroporin facilitiating release of viral particles and resulting in cytolysis; however the presence and role of VP4 have been disputed.

== Multiplicity reactivation ==
SV40 is capable of multiplicity reactivation (MR). MR is the process by which two or more virus genomes, each containing otherwise lethal damage, interact within an infected cell to form a viable virus genome. Yamamato and Shimojo observed MR when SV40 virions were irradiated with UV light and allowed to undergo multiple infection of host cells. Hall studied MR when SV 40 virions were exposed to the DNA crosslinking agent 4, 5', 8-trimethylpsoralen. Under conditions in which only a single virus particle entered each host cell, approximately one DNA cross-link was lethal to the virus and could not be repaired. In contrast, when multiple viral genomes infected a host cell, psoralen-induced DNA cross-links were repaired; that is, MR occurred. Hall suggested that the virions with cross-linked DNA were repaired by recombinational repair. Michod et al. reviewed numerous examples of MR in different viruses and suggested that MR is a common form of sexual interaction that provides the advantage of recombinational repair of genome damages.

== Transcription ==
The early promoter for SV40 contains three elements. The TATA box is located approximately 20 base-pairs upstream from the transcriptional start site. The 21 base-pair repeats contain six GC boxes and are the site that determines the direction of transcription. Also, the 72 base-pair repeats are transcriptional enhancers. When the SP1 protein interacts with the 21 base-pair repeats, it binds either the first or the last three GC boxes. Binding the first three initiates early expression, binding the last three initiates late expression. The function of the 72 base-pair repeats is to enhance the amount of stable RNA and increase the rate of synthesis. This is done by binding (dimerization) with the AP-1 transcription factor to give a primary transcript that is 3' polyadenylated and 5' capped.

== Other animals ==
SV40 is dormant and is asymptomatic in rhesus monkeys. The virus has been found in many macaque populations in the wild, where it rarely causes disease. However, in monkeys that are immunodeficient—due to, for example, infection with simian immunodeficiency virus—SV40 acts much like the human JC and BK polyomaviruses, producing kidney disease and sometimes a demyelinating disease similar to progressive multifocal leukoencephalopathy. In other species, particularly hamsters, SV40 causes a variety of tumors, generally sarcomas. In rats, the oncogenic SV40 large T antigen was used to establish a brain tumor model for primitive neuroectodermal tumor and medulloblastoma.

The molecular mechanisms by which the virus reproduces and alters cell function were previously unknown, and research into SV40 vastly increased biologists' understanding of gene expression and the regulation of cell growth.

== History ==
SV40 was first identified by Ben Sweet and Maurice Hilleman in 1960 when they found that between 10 and 30% of polio vaccines in the US were contaminated with SV40. In 1962, Bernice Eddy described the SV40 oncogenic function inducing sarcoma and ependymomas in hamsters inoculated with monkeys cells infected with SV40. The complete viral genome was sequenced by Weissman at Yale University (US) in 1978 and also by Fiers and his team at the University of Ghent (Belgium).

== Culture and society ==
SV40 has become a totemic subject among anti-vaccination activists, where its presence in contaminated vaccine is accused of being a cause of a cancer "epidemic" and of being responsible for HIV/AIDS.

== See also ==
- Mason-Pfizer monkey virus packaging signal
- SV40 Cancer Foundation
