= Seroprevalence =

Measurement of antibodies detected in a population

Seroprevalence is the number of persons in a population who test positive for a specific disease based on serology (blood serum) specimens, often presented as a percent of the total specimens tested or as a proportion per 100,000 persons tested. As positively identifying the occurrence of disease is usually based upon the presence of antibodies for that disease (especially with viral infections such as herpes simplex, HIV, and SARS-CoV-2), this number is not significant if the specificity of the antibody is low.
