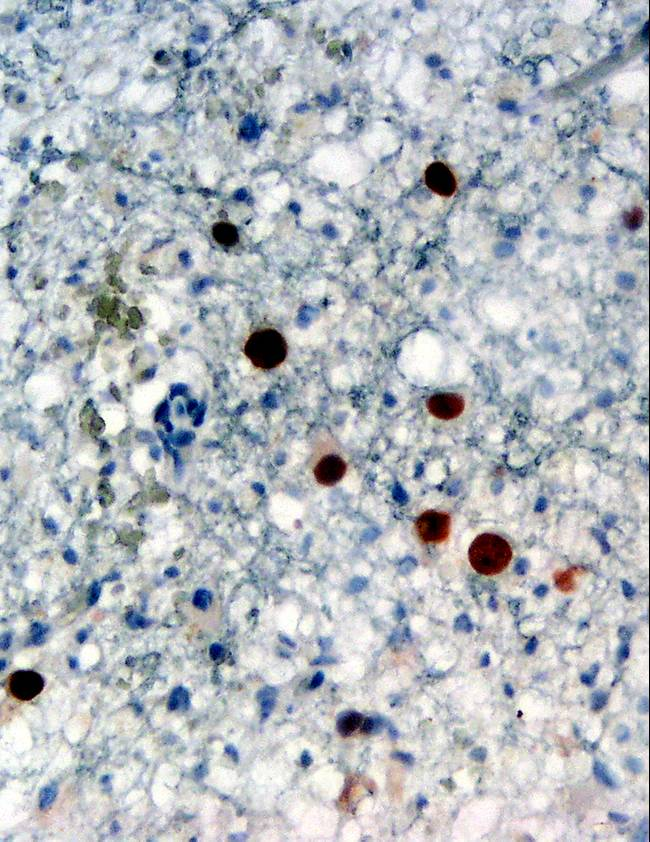
- Immunohistochemical detection of human polyomavirus 2 protein (stained brown) in a brain biopsy (glia demonstrating progressive multifocal leukoencephalopathy)

Virus classification
- (unranked): Virus
- Realm: Floreoviria
- Kingdom: Shotokuvirae
- Phylum: Cossaviricota
- Class: Papovaviricetes
- Order: Sepolyvirales
- Family: Polyomaviridae
- Genus: Betapolyomavirus
- Species: Betapolyomavirus secuhominis

Synonyms
- JC polyomavirus; JC virus

= Human polyomavirus 2 =

Species of virus

Human polyomavirus 2, commonly referred to as the JC virus or John Cunningham virus, is a type of human polyomavirus. It was identified by electron microscopy in 1965 by ZuRhein and Chou, and by Silverman and Rubinstein. It was later isolated in culture and named using the initials of a patient by the name of John Cunningham from whom it was isolated and who had developed progressive multifocal leukoencephalopathy (PML). The virus causes leukoencephalopathy and other diseases only in cases of immunodeficiency, as in AIDS or during treatment with immunosuppressive drugs (e.g., in organ transplant patients).

== Infection and pathogenesis ==
The initial site of infection may be the tonsils, or possibly the gastrointestinal tract. The virus then remains latent in the gastrointestinal tract and can also infect the tubular epithelial cells in the kidneys, where it continues to reproduce, shedding virus particles in the urine. In addition, recent studies suggest that this virus may latently infect the human semen as well as the chorionic villi tissues. Serum antibodies against human polyomavirus 2 have also been found in spontaneous abortion-affected women as well as in women who underwent voluntary interruption of pregnancy.

Human polyomavirus 2 can cross the blood–brain barrier into the central nervous system, where it infects oligodendrocytes and astrocytes, possibly through the 5-HT_{2A} serotonin receptor. Human polyomavirus 2 DNA can be detected in both non-PML affected and PML-affected (see below) brain tissue.

Human polyomavirus 2 found in the central nervous system of PML patients almost invariably have differences in promoter sequence to human polyomavirus 2 found in healthy individuals. It is thought that these differences in promoter sequence contribute to the fitness of the virus in the CNS and thus to the development of PML. Certain transcription factors present in the early promoter sequences of human polyomavirus 2 can induce tropism and viral proliferation that leads to PML. The Spi-B factor was shown to be crucial in initiating viral replication in certain strains of transgenic mice. The protein encoded by these early sequences, T-antigen, also plays a key role in viral proliferation, directing the initiation of DNA replication for the virus as well as performing a transcriptional switch to allow for the formation of the various capsid and regulatory proteins needed for viral fitness. Further research is needed to determine the exact etiological role of T-antigen, but there seems to be a connection to the early initiation of the active virus from its archetypal dormant state.

Immunodeficiency or immunosuppression allows human polyomavirus 2 to reactivate. In the brain, it causes the often fatal progressive multifocal leukoencephalopathy, or PML, by destroying oligodendrocytes. Whether this represents the reactivation of human polyomavirus 2 within the CNS or seeding of newly reactivated human polyomavirus 2 via blood or lymphatics is unknown. Several studies since 2000 have suggested that the virus is also linked to colorectal cancer, as human polyomavirus 2 has been found in malignant colon tumors, but these findings are still controversial.

== Other strains and novel pathological syndromes ==
Although human polyomavirus 2 infection is classically associated with white matter demyelination and PML pathogenesis, recent literature has identified viral variants as etiological agents of other novel syndromes. For example, human polyomavirus 2 has been found to infect the granule cell layer of the cerebellum, while sparing Purkinje cells, ultimately causing severe cerebellar atrophy. This syndrome, called JCV granule cell layer neuronopathy (JCV GCN), is characterized by a productive and lytic infection by a JC variant with a mutation in the VP1 coding region.

Human polyomavirus 2 also appears to mediate encephalopathy, due to infection of cortical pyramidal neurons (CPN) and astrocytes. Analysis of the JCV CPN variant revealed differences from JCV GCN: no mutations were found in the VP1 coding region; however, a 143–base-pair deletion was identified in the agnogene, coding for a 10–amino-acid truncated peptide, which is believed to mediate CPN tropism. Additionally, analysis of the subcellular localization of JC CPN virions in nuclei, cytoplasm, and axons suggests that the virus may travel through axons to increase infectivity.

Human polyomavirus 2 may also be a causative agent of aseptic meningitis (JCVM), as human polyomavirus 2 was the only pathogen identified in the CSF of certain patients with meningitis. Analysis of the JCVM variant revealed archetype-like regulatory regions with no mutations in coding sequences. The precise molecular mechanisms mediating human polyomavirus 2 meningeal tropism remain to be found.

== Epidemiology ==
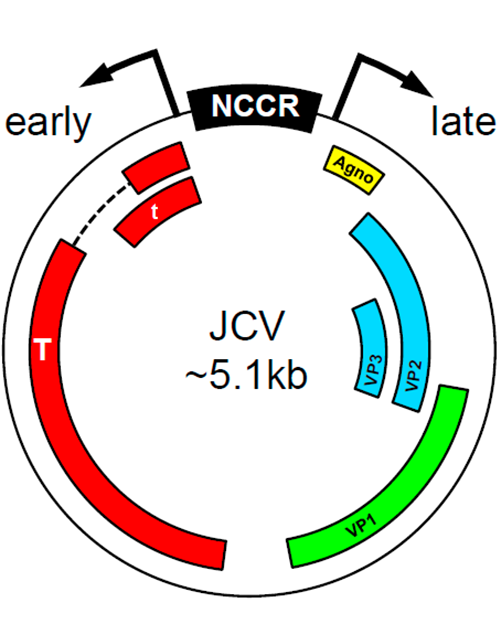
A map of the genome of human polyomavirus 2, indicating the position of the tumor antigen genes (red), the three capsid protein genes (green and blue), the agnogene (yellow), and the non-coding control region (NCCR).

The virus is very common in the general population, infecting 70% to 90% of humans; most people acquire human polyomavirus 2 in childhood or adolescence. It is found in high concentrations in urban sewage worldwide, leading some researchers to suspect contaminated water as a typical route of infection.

Minor genetic variations are found consistently in different geographic areas; thus, genetic analysis of human polyomavirus 2 samples has been useful in tracing the history of human migration. 14 subtypes or genotypes are recognised each associated with a specific geographical region. Three are found in Europe (a, b and c). A minor African type—Af1—occurs in Central and West Africa. The major African type—Af2—is found throughout Africa and also in West and South Asia. Several Asian types are recognised B1-a, B1-b, B1-d, B2, CY, MY and SC.

An alternative numbering scheme numbers the genotypes 1–8 with additional lettering. Types 1 and 4 are found in Europe and in indigenous populations in northern Japan, North-East Siberia and northern Canada. These two types are closely related. Types 3 and 6 are found in sub-Saharan Africa: type 3 was isolated in Ethiopia, Tanzania and South Africa. Type 6 is found in Ghana. Both types are also found in the Biaka Pygmies and Bantus from Central Africa. Type 2 has several variants: subtype 2A is found mainly in the Japanese population and Native Americans (excluding Inuit); 2B is found in Eurasians; 2D is found in Indians and 2E is found in Australians and western Pacific populations. Subtype 7A is found in southern China and South-East Asia. Subtype 7B is found in northern China, Mongolia and Japan Subtype 7C is found in northern and southern China. Subtype 8 is found in Papua New Guinea and the Pacific Islands. The geographic distribution of JC polyomavirus types may help to trace humans from different continents by JC genotyping.

== Drugs associated with reactivation ==
Since immunodeficiency causes this virus to progress to PML, immunosuppressants and other immune-modulating therapies are sometimes implicated in the etiology of PML. Some guidelines suggest serologic testing of patients prior to initiation of immune-modulating therapy in order to stratify patient risk, though positivity does not strictly contraindicate administration of such agents. Compared to other sources of immunocompromization, immunosuppressants appear to cause differing levels of susceptibility to PML.

The boxed warning for the drug rituximab (Rituxan) includes a statement that human polyomavirus 2 infection resulting in progressive multifocal leukoencephalopathy, and death has been reported in patients treated with the drug.

The boxed warning for the drug natalizumab (Tysabri) includes a statement that human polyomavirus 2 resulted in progressive multifocal leukoencephalopathy developing in three patients who received natalizumab in clinical trials. This is now one of the most common causes of PML.

The boxed warning had been included for the drugs Tecfidera and Gilenya, both of which have had incidences of PML resulting in death.

The boxed warning added on February 19, 2009, for the drug efalizumab (Raptiva) includes a statement that human polyomavirus 2, resulting in progressive multifocal leukoencephalopathy, developed in three patients who received efalizumab in clinical trials. The drug was pulled off the U.S. market because of the association with PML on April 10, 2009.

A boxed warning for brentuximab vedotin (Adcetris) was issued by the FDA on January 13, 2011 after two cases of PML were reported, bringing the total number of associated cases to three.

== Human migration patterns ==
It has been observed that several region-specific subtypes of this virus occur in different populations. Based on this observation, the subtypes of this virus have now been used to study human migration patterns. Currently more than 30 genotypes of this virus are known.
