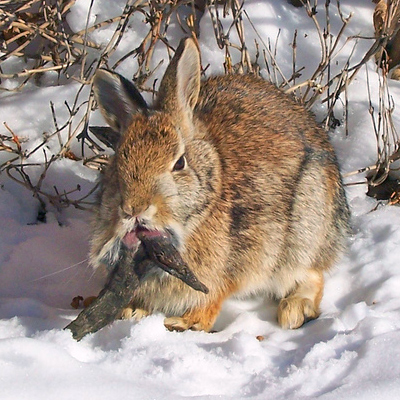
- Rabbit with Shope papillomavirus infection

Virus classification
- (unranked): Virus
- Realm: Floreoviria
- Kingdom: Shotokuvirae
- Phylum: Cossaviricota
- Class: Papovaviricetes
- Order: Zurhausenvirales
- Family: Papillomaviridae
- Genus: Kappapapillomavirus
- Species: Kappapapillomavirus 2

Synonyms
- Rabbit papilloma virus; Rabbit (Shope) papilloma virus; Cottontail rabbit papillomavirus (Shope); Cottontail rabbit papillomavirus

= Shope papilloma virus =

Papilloma virus which infects certain leporids

The Shope papilloma virus (SPV), also known as cottontail rabbit papilloma virus (CRPV) or Kappapapillomavirus 2, is a papillomavirus which infects certain species of rabbit and hare, causing cancerous lesions (carcinomas) resembling horns, typically on or near the animal's head. The carcinomas can metastasize or become large enough to interfere with the host's ability to eat, causing starvation. Richard E. Shope investigated the horns and discovered the virus in 1933, an important breakthrough in the study of oncoviruses. The virus was originally discovered in cottontail rabbits in the Midwestern United States but can also infect brush rabbits, black-tailed jackrabbits, snowshoe hares, European rabbits, and domestic rabbits.

== History ==
In the 1930s, hunters in northwestern Iowa reported that the rabbits they shot had several "horn" protrusions on many parts of their bodies including their faces and necks. The virus is also a possible source of myths about the jackalope, a rabbit with the horns of an antelope, and related cryptids such as the wolpertinger. Stories and illustrations of horned rabbits appear in scientific treatises dating back many years, such as the Tableau encyclopédique et méthodique, from 1655.

The reports led cancer researcher Richard E. Shope to investigate, culminating in the virus officially being discovered and named in 1933. Shope determined the protrusions were keratinous carcinomas due to the infection of CRPV. Shope's research led to the development of the first mammalian model of cancer caused by a virus. He was able to isolate virus particles from tumors on captured animals and use them to inoculate domestic rabbits, which then developed similar tumors. This has contributed to our understanding of fundamental mechanisms in neoplasia, or the formation of a new, abnormal growth of tissue. The virus was sequenced in 1984, showing substantial sequence similarities to HPV1a. It has been used as a model for human papillomaviruses both before and after this discovery. The most visible example of this role is the HPV vaccine, which was developed based on and incorporating research done using the virus as a model. Similarly, it has been used to investigate antiviral therapies.

== Genome ==
There is a lack of specific data about the reproductive cycle of papillomaviruses. Research is not conclusive about which coding regions are expressed before or after replication of viral DNA. E1 is the largest open reading frame (ORF), which is the set of codons in the genome that code for proteins, encoding a 602 amino acid protein. E1 is similar to COOH-terminal domain of the Simian virus 40, plays a role in viral DNA replication maintaining plasmids within a cell. CRPV and BPV1 are found in the same location of the genome, which indicates that papillomaviruses likely have similar methods of replicating their genomes outside of a chromosome. A notable difference between the genomes of the four strains is that the E6 protein is almost twice as long in the CRPV as in any of the other strains of papillomaviruses. The E6 protein's ORF is similar (homologous) to the beta subunit of a family of ATP syntheses that are found in mitochondria of cattle. The homology is significant enough to imply an evolutionary relationship between E6 and the beta chain of the ATP synthase family; however, they do not have the same function or enzyme activity. The E2 protein overlaps with the E4 open reading frames in the other papillomaviruses. These differences in the E2 proteins likely determine how oncogenic a virus is. The noncoding region has a homologies with BPV1. Other homologies exist, such as the fact that all papillomaviruses have repeated sequences in the noncoding parts of their genomes. CRPV has some notable repeats, some as long as 32 base pairs. Many pairs up stream of the transcription locations are homologous with promoter sequences in of SV40.

== Life cycle ==
=== Replication cycle and transcription ===
The papillomavirus life cycle begins with cells actively multiplying in epithelial cells of basal and parabasal layers. The differentiation of these cells is necessary for this virus to complete its life cycle. Transforming proteins E6 and E7 induce the S-phase in the lower epithelial layers. Viral replication proteins E1 and E2 are also required to form the papilloma and keep the episomal viral genome replication low. Genome amplification will be restrained until viral replication proteins increase and several viral proteins are co-expressed. The infected, differentiating cells travel towards the epithelial surface during the viral cycle's late stage. In the upper epithelial layers, the promoter activity is altered during the virus’ production. E4 proteins are expressed, and viral DNA amplification starts in the differentiated cells. Following this, the L1 and L2 viral capsid proteins are expressed, and the infectious virions begin to assemble.

Expression of the papillomavirus E4 protein correlates with the onset of viral DNA amplification. Using a mutant cottontail rabbit papillomavirus (SPV) genome incapable of expressing the viral E4 protein, it has been shown that E4 is required for the productive stage of the SPV life cycle in New Zealand White and cottontail rabbits.

=== Assembly and release ===
The virus particles are assembled in the upper epithelium. The virus capsomere icosahedral shell is packaged with an 8000 base pair genome, 360 L1 protein copies, and 12 copies of L2 proteins inside. L2 proteins gather at PML body nuclear structures and recruit L1 proteins during virus assemblage. L2 proteins are not necessary for assemblage, but it is possible that they augment packaging and infectivity. Capsid proteins have been thought to also gather at the PML bodies during packaging.

Transmission of the Papillomavirus requires release from the infected skin cell at the epithelial surface, as they are non-lytic. They are resistant to desiccation, enhancing their survivability during extracellular transfer between hosts. Cornified squame release from the surface of epithelial cells may also contribute to their survival. Immune detection of the virus in the host may also be hindered by antigen retention until the virus reaches upper epithelial cells.

== Modulation of host processes ==
When Richard E. Shope began his research on SPV, little was known about the natural transmission of the virus vectors and interactions of the virus on its hosts. In the lab setting, Shope worked with the virus’ natural host, the cottontail rabbit. Particularly, he worked with the cottontails of Iowa and other western states of the United States because it was discovered that SPV had a restricted geographic range and was confined to the high plains of the western United States. Therefore, the major host species of SPV is the cottontail rabbit of the western United States. Cottontail rabbits in Shope's lab usually were infected with the virus through parasites such as rabbit ticks. When infected with SPV, hosts develop papillomas on hair-bearing skin, usually around the face and neck. Shope found through his research that rabbit epidermal cell transformation by SPV requires interaction with mesenchymal cells. It was further found that mesenchymal types support papillomatous transformation. Shope's research also investigated how vitamin A deficiencies or excess might affect host susceptibility to SPV. Shope found that deficiencies in vitamin A did not affect the relative growth of the papillomas, but in cases where there were excesses of vitamin A, Shope papillomas were inhibited.

=== Location in the host ===
Fluorescent antibody study identified the locations of viral antigens in wild rabbit papillomas. They were present only in the nucleus of keratohyaline and keratinized layer cells, and not deeper down in proliferating epithelial cells. In domesticated rabbits, the viral antigens were present in much smaller quantity in only superficial, keratinized layers. The investigation proposed that the virus is only present in proliferating cell nuclei during early development, containing a deficient number of proteins and mostly nucleic acid. The proteins may be immunologically specific in order to keep its transmissibility, making it a masked virus.

== Associated viruses ==
Most homologous papillomaviruses are actually CRPV and HPV1a. This is possibly because both of these viruses target the skin. From an evolutionary perspective, CRPV and HPV1a could have diverged recently, or they could have converged due to their similar target. CRPV is a member of the papillomaviruses so it is related to all viruses in this family.

== Tropism ==
Infection of a rabbit's follicular cell often occurs in the ears, nose, eyelids, and the anus. The infection first appears as a red and swollen area on the skin, followed by development of circular papilloma warts and keratinized horny warts. Although transmission between rabbits is high, the tumors themselves do not contain the infectious virus. 25% of Papilloma infections become malignant and form squamous cell carcinoma. Metastases can form in the lungs and lymph nodes, and if it advances further, can develop in the kidneys and the liver.

Rabbit Papilloma displays tropism for the cutaneous epithelium. Warts are made up of nearly homogenous vertical tissue strands. Their outer coloration is typically black or greyish, and cut sections are usually white or pinkish white with a flesh-like center. Dark coloration is due to abundant melanin pigment. The warts are made up of several tight, branching, threadlike epidermis processes connected by narrow tissue cores. These growth structures indicate that the growth occurs simultaneously at several different centers, causing the surrounding tissue to bulge from the growth's lateral pressure. The normal epithelium abruptly transitions into a narrow zone of rapidly thickening epithelial layers, made up of rapidly multiplying cells.

Rabbits re-infected with the virus exhibit some or complete immunity, and can transmit the virus to other wild rabbits, and from wild to domestic rabbits. A domestic strain cannot transmit it to another domestic rabbit, however.

Immunologically, the papillomatosis virus is not related to fibroma or myxoma in rabbits.

== See also ==
- Oncovirus – Viruses that can cause cancer
