= Alphapapillomavirus =

Virus classification
- (unranked): Virus
- Realm: Monodnaviria
- Kingdom: Shotokuvirae
- Phylum: Cossaviricota
- Class: Papovaviricetes
- Order: Zurhausenvirales
- Family: Papillomaviridae
- Genus: Alphapapillomavirus

Genus of viruses

Alphapapillomavirus is a genus of viruses in the family Papillomaviridae. Humans and monkeys serve as natural hosts. There are 14 species in this genus. Diseases associated with this genus include warts, papillomas, and malignant tumours. The genital-type species known to carry a high risk for malignancy are HPV-16 and 18 (cervical cancer), and those with a low risk of malignancy are HPV-6 and 11 (genital warts).

== Taxonomy ==
The following species are assigned to the genus:

- Alphapapillomavirus 1
- Alphapapillomavirus 2
- Alphapapillomavirus 3
- Alphapapillomavirus 4
- Alphapapillomavirus 5
- Alphapapillomavirus 6
- Alphapapillomavirus 7
- Alphapapillomavirus 8
- Alphapapillomavirus 9
- Alphapapillomavirus 10
- Alphapapillomavirus 11
- Alphapapillomavirus 12
- Alphapapillomavirus 13
- Alphapapillomavirus 14

== Structure ==
Viruses in Alphapapillomavirus are non-enveloped, with icosahedral geometries, and T=7 symmetry. The diameter is around 60 nm. Genomes are circular, around 8kb in length.

Genus	Structure	Symmetry	Capsid	Genomic arrangement	Genomic segmentation
Alphapapillomavirus	Icosahedral	T=7	Non-enveloped	Circular	Monopartite

== Life cycle ==
Viral replication is nuclear. Entry into the host cell is achieved by attachment of the viral proteins to host receptors, which mediates endocytosis. Replication follows the dsDNA bidirectional replication model. DNA templated transcription, with some alternative splicing mechanism is the method of transcription. Translation takes place by leaky scanning, and ribosomal shunting. The virus exits the host cell by nuclear envelope breakdown. Humans and monkeys serve as the natural host. Transmission routes are sexual and contact.

Genus	Host details	Tissue tropism	Entry details	Release details	Replication site	Assembly site	Transmission
Alphapapillomavirus	Humans; monkeys	Epithelial: mucous; epithelial: skin	Cell receptor endocytosis	Lysis	Nucleus	Nucleus	Sex; contact
