= Kappapapillomavirus =

Virus classification
- (unranked): Virus
- Realm: Monodnaviria
- Kingdom: Shotokuvirae
- Phylum: Cossaviricota
- Class: Papovaviricetes
- Order: Zurhausenvirales
- Family: Papillomaviridae
- Genus: Kappapapillomavirus

Genus of viruses

Kappapapillomavirus is a genus of viruses in the family Papillomaviridae. Rabbits serve as natural hosts. There are two species in this genus. Diseases associated with this genus include cutaneous and mucosal lesions.

== Taxonomy ==
The following two species are assigned to the genus:

- Kappapapillomavirus 1
- Kappapapillomavirus 2

== Structure ==
Viruses in Kappapapillomavirus are non-enveloped, with icosahedral geometries, and T=7 symmetry. The diameter is around 52-55 nm. Genomes are circular, around 8kb in length. The genome codes for 6 proteins, and has 6, 8 open reading frames.

Genus	Structure	Symmetry	Capsid	Genomic arrangement	Genomic segmentation
Kappapapillomavirus	Icosahedral	T=7	Non-enveloped	Circular	Monopartite

== Life cycle ==
Viral replication is nuclear. Entry into the host cell is achieved by attachment of the viral proteins to host receptors, which mediates endocytosis. Replication follows the dsDNA bidirectional replication model. DNA-templated transcription, with some alternative splicing mechanism is the method of transcription. The virus exits the host cell by nuclear envelope breakdown. Rabbits serve as the natural host. Transmission routes are contact.

Genus	Host details	Tissue tropism	Entry details	Release details	Replication site	Assembly site	Transmission
Kappapapillomavirus	Rabbits	Epithelial: mucous; epithelial: skin	Cell receptor endocytosis	Lysis	Nucleus	Nucleus	Contact
