= Betapapillomavirus =

Virus classification
- (unranked): Virus
- Realm: Monodnaviria
- Kingdom: Shotokuvirae
- Phylum: Cossaviricota
- Class: Papovaviricetes
- Order: Zurhausenvirales
- Family: Papillomaviridae
- Genus: Betapapillomavirus

Genus of viruses

Betapapillomavirus is a genus of viruses in the family Papillomaviridae. Human serve as natural hosts. There are six species in this genus. Diseases associated with this genus include warts, papillomas, and malignant tumours.

== Taxonomy ==
The following six species are assigned to the genus:

- Betapapillomavirus 1
- Betapapillomavirus 2
- Betapapillomavirus 3
- Betapapillomavirus 4
- Betapapillomavirus 5
- Betapapillomavirus 6

== Structure ==
Viruses in Betapapillomavirus are non-enveloped, with icosahedral geometries, and T=7 symmetry. The diameter is around 60 nm. Genomes are circular, around 8kb in length.

Genus	Structure	Symmetry	Capsid	Genomic arrangement	Genomic segmentation
Betapapillomavirus	Icosahedral	T=7	Non-enveloped	Circular	Monopartite

== Life cycle ==
Viral replication is nuclear. Entry into the host cell is achieved by attachment of the viral proteins to host receptors, which mediates endocytosis. Replication follows the dsDNA bidirectional replication model. Dna templated transcription, with some alternative splicing mechanism is the method of transcription. The virus exits the host cell by nuclear envelope breakdown. Human serve as the natural host. Transmission routes are contact.

Genus	Host details	Tissue tropism	Entry details	Release details	Replication site	Assembly site	Transmission
Betapapillomavirus	Humans	Epithelial: mucous; epithelial: skin	Cell receptor endocytosis	Lysis	Nucleus	Nucleus	Contact
