= Epsilonpapillomavirus =

Virus classification
- (unranked): Virus
- Realm: Monodnaviria
- Kingdom: Shotokuvirae
- Phylum: Cossaviricota
- Class: Papovaviricetes
- Order: Zurhausenvirales
- Family: Papillomaviridae
- Genus: Epsilonpapillomavirus

Genus of viruses

Epsilonpapillomavirus is a genus of viruses in the family Papillomaviridae. Cattle serve as the natural hosts of these bovine papillomaviruses. There are two species in this genus. Diseases associated with this genus include fibropapillomas and true epithelial papillomas of the skin.

== Taxonomy ==
The following two species are assigned to the genus:

- Epsilonpapillomavirus 1
- Epsilonpapillomavirus 2

== Structure ==
Viruses in Epsilonpapillomavirus are non-enveloped, with icosahedral geometries, and T=7 symmetry. The diameter is around 60 nm. Genomes are circular, around 8kb in length. The genome codes for 6 proteins.

Genus	Structure	Symmetry	Capsid	Genomic arrangement	Genomic segmentation
Epsilonpapillomavirus	Icosahedral	T=7	Non-enveloped	Circular	Monopartite

== Life cycle ==
Viral replication is nuclear. Entry into the host cell is achieved by attachment of the viral proteins to host receptors, which mediates endocytosis. Replication follows the dsDNA bidirectional replication model. Dna templated transcription, with some alternative splicing mechanism is the method of transcription. The virus exits the host cell by nuclear envelope breakdown. Bovine serve as the natural host. Transmission routes are contact.

Genus	Host details	Tissue tropism	Entry details	Release details	Replication site	Assembly site	Transmission
Epsilonpapillomavirus	Bovines	Epithelial: skin	Cell receptor endocytosis	Lysis	Nucleus	Nucleus	Contact
