= Zetapapillomavirus =

Virus classification
- (unranked): Virus
- Realm: Monodnaviria
- Kingdom: Shotokuvirae
- Phylum: Cossaviricota
- Class: Papovaviricetes
- Order: Zurhausenvirales
- Family: Papillomaviridae
- Genus: Zetapapillomavirus

Genus of viruses

Zetapapillomavirus is a genus of viruses in the family Papillomaviridae. Horses serve as natural hosts. There is only one species in this genus: Zetapapillomavirus 1. Diseases associated with this genus include cutaneous lesions.

== Structure ==
Viruses in Zetapapillomavirus are non-enveloped, with icosahedral geometries, and T=7 symmetry. The diameter is around 52-55 nm. Genomes are circular, around 7kb in length.

Genus	Structure	Symmetry	Capsid	Genomic arrangement	Genomic segmentation
Zetapapillomavirus	Icosahedral	T=7	Non-enveloped	Circular	Monopartite

== Life cycle ==
Viral replication is nuclear. Entry into the host cell is achieved by attachment of the viral proteins to host receptors, which mediates endocytosis. Replication follows the dsDNA bidirectional replication model. DNA-templated transcription, with some alternative splicing mechanism is the method of transcription. The virus exits the host cell by nuclear envelope breakdown. Horses serve as the natural host. Transmission routes are contact.

Genus	Host details	Tissue tropism	Entry details	Release details	Replication site	Assembly site	Transmission
Zetapapillomavirus	Horses	Epithelial: mucous; epithelial: skin	Cell receptor endocytosis	Lysis	Nucleus	Nucleus	Contact
