= Gammapapillomavirus =

Virus classification
- (unranked): Virus
- Realm: Monodnaviria
- Kingdom: Shotokuvirae
- Phylum: Cossaviricota
- Class: Papovaviricetes
- Order: Zurhausenvirales
- Family: Papillomaviridae
- Genus: Gammapapillomavirus

Genus of viruses

Gammapapillomavirus is a genus of viruses in the family Papillomaviridae. Human serve as their natural hosts. There are 27 species in this genus. Diseases associated with this genus include warts and papillomas.

== Taxonomy ==
The following 27 species are assigned to the genus:

- Gammapapillomavirus 1
- Gammapapillomavirus 2
- Gammapapillomavirus 3
- Gammapapillomavirus 4
- Gammapapillomavirus 5
- Gammapapillomavirus 6
- Gammapapillomavirus 7
- Gammapapillomavirus 8
- Gammapapillomavirus 9
- Gammapapillomavirus 10
- Gammapapillomavirus 11
- Gammapapillomavirus 12
- Gammapapillomavirus 13
- Gammapapillomavirus 14
- Gammapapillomavirus 15
- Gammapapillomavirus 16
- Gammapapillomavirus 17
- Gammapapillomavirus 18
- Gammapapillomavirus 19
- Gammapapillomavirus 20
- Gammapapillomavirus 21
- Gammapapillomavirus 22
- Gammapapillomavirus 23
- Gammapapillomavirus 24
- Gammapapillomavirus 25
- Gammapapillomavirus 26
- Gammapapillomavirus 27

== Structure ==
Viruses in Gammapapillomavirus are non-enveloped, with icosahedral geometries, and T=7 symmetry. The diameter is around 60 nm. Genomes are circular, around 8kb in length.

Genus	Structure	Symmetry	Capsid	Genomic arrangement	Genomic segmentation
Gammapapillomavirus	Icosahedral	T=7	Non-enveloped	Circular	Monopartite

== Life cycle ==
Viral replication is nuclear. Entry into the host cell is achieved by attachment of the viral proteins to host receptors, which mediates endocytosis. Replication follows the dsDNA bidirectional replication model. DNA-templated transcription, with some alternative splicing mechanism is the method of transcription. The virus exits the host cell by nuclear envelope breakdown. Human serve as the natural host. Transmission routes are contact.

Genus	Host details	Tissue tropism	Entry details	Release details	Replication site	Assembly site	Transmission
Gammapapillomavirus	Humans	Epithelial: mucous; epithelial: skin	Cell receptor endocytosis	Lysis	Nucleus	Nucleus	Contact
