= Lambdapapillomavirus =

Virus classification
- (unranked): Virus
- Realm: Monodnaviria
- Kingdom: Shotokuvirae
- Phylum: Cossaviricota
- Class: Papovaviricetes
- Order: Zurhausenvirales
- Family: Papillomaviridae
- Genus: Lambdapapillomavirus

Genus of viruses

Lambdapapillomavirus is a genus of viruses in the family Papillomaviridae. Cats and dogs serve as natural hosts. There are five species in this genus. Diseases associated with this genus include mucosal and cutaneous lesions.

== Taxonomy ==
The following five species are assigned to the genus:

- Lambdapapillomavirus 1
- Lambdapapillomavirus 2
- Lambdapapillomavirus 3
- Lambdapapillomavirus 4
- Lambdapapillomavirus 5

== Structure ==
Viruses in Lambdapapillomavirus are non-enveloped, with icosahedral geometries, and T=7 symmetry. The diameter is around 52-55 nm. Genomes are circular, around 8kb in length.

Genus	Structure	Symmetry	Capsid	Genomic arrangement	Genomic segmentation
Lambdapapillomavirus	Icosahedral	T=7	Non-enveloped	Circular	Monopartite

== Life cycle ==
Viral replication is nuclear. Entry into the host cell is achieved by attachment of the viral proteins to host receptors, which mediates endocytosis. Replication follows the dsDNA bidirectional replication model. DNA-templated transcription, with some alternative splicing mechanism is the method of transcription. The virus exits the host cell by nuclear envelope breakdown. Cats and dogs serve as the natural host. Transmission routes are contact.

Genus	Host details	Tissue tropism	Entry details	Release details	Replication site	Assembly site	Transmission
Lambdapapillomavirus	Cats; dogs	Epithelial: mucous; epithelial: skin	Cell receptor endocytosis	Lysis	Nucleus	Nucleus	Contact
