= William Fleming Hoggan Jarrett =

British veterinary pathologist (1928–2011)

William "Bill" Fleming Hoggan Jarrett (1928–2011) was a British pathologist.

== Personal life ==
William "Bill" Fleming Hoggan was born on 2 January 1928 in Glasgow, Scotland. He studied at Lenzie Academy, Glasgow, and at Glasgow Veterinary College. His father, though a joiner and cabinetmaker, came from a farming background and decided to move his family shortly afterwards to an agricultural smallholding near Cumbernauld.

Their early life there no doubt influenced Jarrett, his elder brother Tom and younger brother Oswald to study veterinary medicine. Jarrett graduated from Glasgow Veterinary College with honours in 1947. Attracted to research he opted for a PhD. He continued his training at the College, specialising in animal pathology as well as in human pathology. He worked under Dan Cappell, Professor of Pathology at the Medical School.

Consequently, he had a wide understanding of animal and human diseases. This laid the foundation for his future research in comparative medicine. He also went onto teach at the University of Glasgow and later became a Lecturer at the Glasgow and West of Scotland College of Domestic Science. His achievements began to unfold and during the 1960s he began to make a name for himself in animal pathology through his extensive research and discoveries.

== Married life ==
In 1952 Jarrett married Anna Sharp, who was also a Lecturer at the Glasgow and West of Scotland College of Domestic Science. The couple established a home in the countryside north of Glasgow.

Jarrett and Anna had actually known each other since their school days. At the Lenzie Academy they developed a passion for the Scottish countryside, especially for the mountains. Over the years they engaged in sports that carried a certain frisson: mountaineering, skiing, motor rallying and particularly sailing off the west coast of Scotland, France, and Mallorca.

== Favourite pastimes ==
Outside their professional careers the couple relaxed either in the company of one another or with family and friends. Jarrett learnt how to become a talented musician. He played the trumpet, guitar and sang with a Scots and jazz band. Passionate about politics he became a voracious reader. As a bon viveur he knew his malt whiskies. A particular fascination that held him were his memories of having gallantly consumed oysters at the Oyster Bar in New York's Grand Central Station. Oysters counted as one of his favourite relishes.

Jarrett died on 27 August 2011.

== Children ==
Jarrett and his wife had two daughters, Freda and Ruth. They both distinguished themselves through their own efforts as well as receiving the support of their parents. In time they became successful medical graduates. Freda's children Amanda and Hamish, and his brother Oswald continue the family line with fond memories handed down to them about their extraordinary and loveable grandfather.

== Research ==
In 1964, Jarrett discovered the retrovirus that causes leukemia and lymphoma in cats. During diagnostic pathology work at Garscube, Jarrett noted a very much higher prevalence of lymphoma in cats than in man. When a local veterinary practitioner drew to his attention a household of cats in which a large number of cases had occurred, Jarrett considered how the reason might be due to the disease being infectious.

The case appeared similar to the condition in domestic poultry and laboratory mice. Jarrett set up transmission experiments in cats using material from one of these cases. In 1963, after an incubation period of over a year, the disease was transmitted and a virus was demonstrated in the resulting tumours. This was subsequently shown to be a novel retrovirus, feline leukaemia virus (FeLV).

The discovery of FeLV immediately provoked great interest in the field of oncology, occurring at a time in the early 1960s when viruses were becoming seriously considered as causes of cancer in man. The virus was described as 'Exhibit A' in an application to the US Congress by the National Cancer Institute (NCI) for substantial funding to set up the Special Virus Cancer Program in 1968, which established an infrastructure for subsequent virus hunting in human cancers.

Subsequently the most direct impact of FeLV on human medicine was the influence of Jarrett's work on his friend Robert Gallo at the NCI. Gallo was persuaded to explore human T-cell leukaemias for viruses after Jarrett found that most lymphomas caused by FeLV in cats were of T-lymphocyte origin. He established a way to grow T-cells in long-term culture from which came his discovery of the first human retrovirus, human T-lymphotropic virus (HTLV-1), and later human immunodeficiency virus (HIV).

With substantial funding from cancer charities, Jarrett then recruited a team which investigated the biology of FeLV in depth, which resulted in his work widening to include other collaborators throughout the world. The virus was shown to be a common infection of cats, particularly affecting animals kept in groups, in which the virus was transmitted very efficiently.

Many animals recovered from the infection but some became persistently infected and had a very high risk of developing leukaemia or lymphoma. Diagnostic tests were developed which identified infected animals. By isolating these cats, spread of the virus could be halted. Jarrett also showed that vaccination was possible and the team he had brought together collaborated with pharmaceutical companies in the development of a variety of commercial vaccines.

== Research results ==
The application of Jarrett's research methods of control has resulted in FeLV infection now being uncommon in many countries and has made a profound improvement to cat welfare. Consistent and methodical collaboration with colleagues yielded great results.

A valuable contribution to Jarrett's group was undertaken by Jim Neil (FRSE) whose molecular biological colleagues worked at the Beatson Institute for Cancer Research on the University of Glasgow's Garscube campus. Here the research team was provided with an opportunity of how to define the molecular events in the pathogenesis of lymphoma by FeLV. They discovered that the virus activated cellular oncogenes by several mechanisms of insertional mutagenesis.

When Neil subsequently moved his group to the Veterinary School and established a Laboratory of Molecular Oncology, he began to use this device in other systems to identify novel oncogenes. He also became involved in defining the molecular events that caused other FeLV-related disease. Jarrett's detailed pathological studies of haematopoietic disease in the cat showed that FeLV caused several types of anaemia as well as leukaemia and lymphoma.

FeLV subtypes were recognised, showing how this caused problems for pure red cell aplasia (PRCA). Furthermore, the research team showed these viruses to be mutants of the common form of the virus, which blocked the production of red blood cells at a specific stage of differentiation.

Another offshoot of the expertise generated by FeLV research was the creation of the Leukaemia Research Fund Human Virus Centre with the remit to discover viruses as causes of human leukaemia and lymphoma. The first director was David Onions (FRSE) who had been involved in defining the pathogenesis of PRCA in cats. The current director of the Centre is Jarrett's daughter Ruth, a graduate in medicine who had been a postgraduate scientist with Robert Gallo.

== Legacy of achievement ==
Jarrett had made great strides so that by 1968 he had been appointed Professor of Veterinary Pathology at Glasgow. He attracted substantial funding for new research laboratories. During the 1970s and 1980s, following observations in the 1960s of papillomas in association with clusters of vulvo-cutaneous carcinomas in Friesian cattle in the Highlands of Kenya, with Max Murray (FRSE), he investigated the reasons for a high incidence of alimentary tract carcinoma in cattle in parts of Scotland.

Through a large abattoir survey Jarrett showed that papillomas were more common and occurred in greater numbers in animals of all ages on the cancer farms compared to lowland cattle, and that they were caused by a novel virus, bovine papillomavirus type 4 (BPV-4). In older cattle, he noted that cancers could develop from existing papillomas and proposed that immunosuppressants and carcinogens in bracken were responsible for this malignant progression.

At this time Jarrett established a productive collaboration with Saveria Campo (FRSE) of the Beatson Institute. With Jarrett, she and her colleagues investigated in detail the biology of bovine papillomaviruses, especially BPV-1, -2 and -4, and developed recombinant vaccines of BPV-4 proteins that protected cattle from developing papillomas when challenged, and indeed could slow the growth of existing tumours.

These results laid the conceptual framework for the production of vaccines against the subtypes of human papillomaviruses that cause cervical cancer in women, which are now offered routinely to young women in many countries. This counts as one of the lasting legacies of Jarrett's dedicated research work in human pathology.

== The fight against AIDS ==
After the co-discovery of HIV by Robert Gallo and Luc Montagnier, Jarrett renewed his association with Gallo and in the late 1980s they worked together in Washington. Jarrett became a Fogarty Scholar inside the nascent field of HIV vaccine research.

It was during the 1980s that Jarrett pressed the case for urgent action against AIDS. He was one of a group of eminent scientists who successfully made the case to Margaret Thatcher and her government how this unique and dangerous disease had to be combated. He argued how it was critically important to have new investment in research possibilities. Jarrett and his colleagues successfully achieved their goal despite public expenditure cuts.

As a result of the magnitude of the AIDS virus Jarrett quickly assumed responsibility so as to coordinate research efforts. He became a founder member of the AIDS Directed Programme of the MRC. With colleagues in Glasgow, particularly Jim Neil and his brother Oswald Hoggan Jarrett, he established a research group that exploited another newly discovered retrovirus, feline immunodeficiency virus, as a model for HIV vaccination.

Perhaps the most telling achievement of the group was one determining the constraints that apply to such a vaccination with this type of retrovirus: in particular, the discovery that certain prototypic vaccines enhanced the virus infection rather than protecting against it. It was unfortunate to discover this outcome which was confirmed subsequently by trials of a HIV vaccine. Work on both FeLV and FIV continues at the School in the Retrovirus Research Laboratory.

== Honours ==
Jarrett was made a Fellow of the Royal Society of Edinburgh in 1965 and awarded the Macdougall-Brisbane Prize 1980-82, and was made a Fellow of the Royal Society in 1980. His uncle, broadcaster Harry Hoggan, brother Oswald, and daughter Ruth were all elected Fellows in following years.
