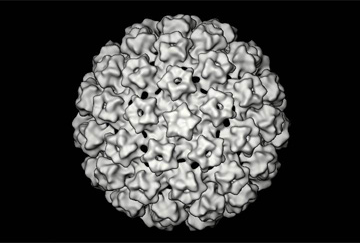
- Bovine papillomavirus (3D reconstruction)

Scientific classification
- (unranked): Virus
- Realm: Monodnaviria
- Kingdom: Shotokuvirae
- Phylum: Cossaviricota
- Class: Papovaviricetes
- Order: Zurhausenvirales
- Family: Papillomaviridae
- Subfamily: Firstpapillomavirinae

Groups included
- Deltapapillomavirus; Deltapapillomavirus 4 (formerly Bovine papillomavirus 1); Epsilonpapillomavirus; Epsilonpapillomavirus 1 (formerly Bovine papillomavirus 5 and Bovine papillomavirus 2); Xipapillomavirus; Xipapillomavirus 1 (formerly Bovine papillomavirus 3 and Bovine papillomavirus 2)

= Bovine papillomavirus =

Bovine papillomaviruses

Group of viruses

Bovine papillomaviruses (BPV) are a paraphyletic group of DNA viruses of the subfamily Firstpapillomavirinae of Papillomaviridae that are common in cattle. All BPVs have a circular double-stranded DNA genome. Infection causes warts (papillomas and fibropapillomas) of the skin and alimentary tract, and more rarely cancers of the alimentary tract and urinary bladder. They are also thought to cause the skin tumour equine sarcoid in horses and donkeys.

BPVs have been used as a model for studying papillomavirus molecular biology and for dissecting the mechanisms by which this group of viruses cause cancer.

== Structure and genetic organisation ==
Like other papillomaviruses, BPVs are small non-enveloped viruses with an icosahedral capsid around 50–60 nm in diameter. The capsid is formed of the L1 and L2 structural proteins, with the L1 C-terminus exposed.

All BPVs have a circular double-stranded DNA genome of 7.3–8.0 kb. The genetic organisation of those BPVs which have been sequenced is broadly similar to other papillomaviruses. The open reading frames (ORFs) are all located on one strand, and are divided into early and late regions. The early region encodes nonstructural proteins E1 to E7. There are three viral oncoproteins, E5, E6 and E7; BPVs of the Xipapillomavirus group lack E6. The late region encodes structural proteins L1 and L2. There is also a non-coding long control region (LCR).

== Types ==
Six types of BPV have been characterised, BPV-1 to BPV-6, which are divided into three broad subgroups.

- Deltapapillomavirus or fibropapillomaviruses (formerly known as subgroup A), including types 1 and 2, have a genome of around 7.9 kb. Similar papillomaviruses of ungulates (e.g. deer papillomavirus, European elk papillomavirus, ovine papillomavirus 1,2) are also found in this group. Like all members of the papillomavirus class, these viruses infect only keratinocytes (epithelial cells); however, unlike other papillomaviruses, they cause proliferation of both keratinocytes and fibroblasts, causing benign fibropapillomas involving both the epithelium and the underlying dermis. The specificity of the types differs:
  - BPV-1 infects paragenital areas, including penis, teats and udders
  - BPV-2 infects skin, alimentary canal and urinary bladder
- Xipapillomavirus or epitheliotropic BPVs (formerly known as subgroup B), including types 3, 4 and 6, have a smaller genome of around 7.3 kb and are unique among papillomaviruses in lacking the E6 oncoprotein. They infect keratinocytes (epithelial cells), causing pure papillomas involving only the epithelium. The specificity of the types differs:
  - BPV-3 infects skin
  - BPV-4 infects the upper alimentary tract
  - BPV-6 infects teats and udders
- Epsilonpapillomavirus has the single member BPV-5, with features intermediate between the other two groups. BPV-5 infects teats and udders, and can cause both pure papillomas and fibropapillomas.

A further thirteen putative BPVs have recently been identified; the novel viruses have yet to be assigned to subgroups.

== Pathology ==
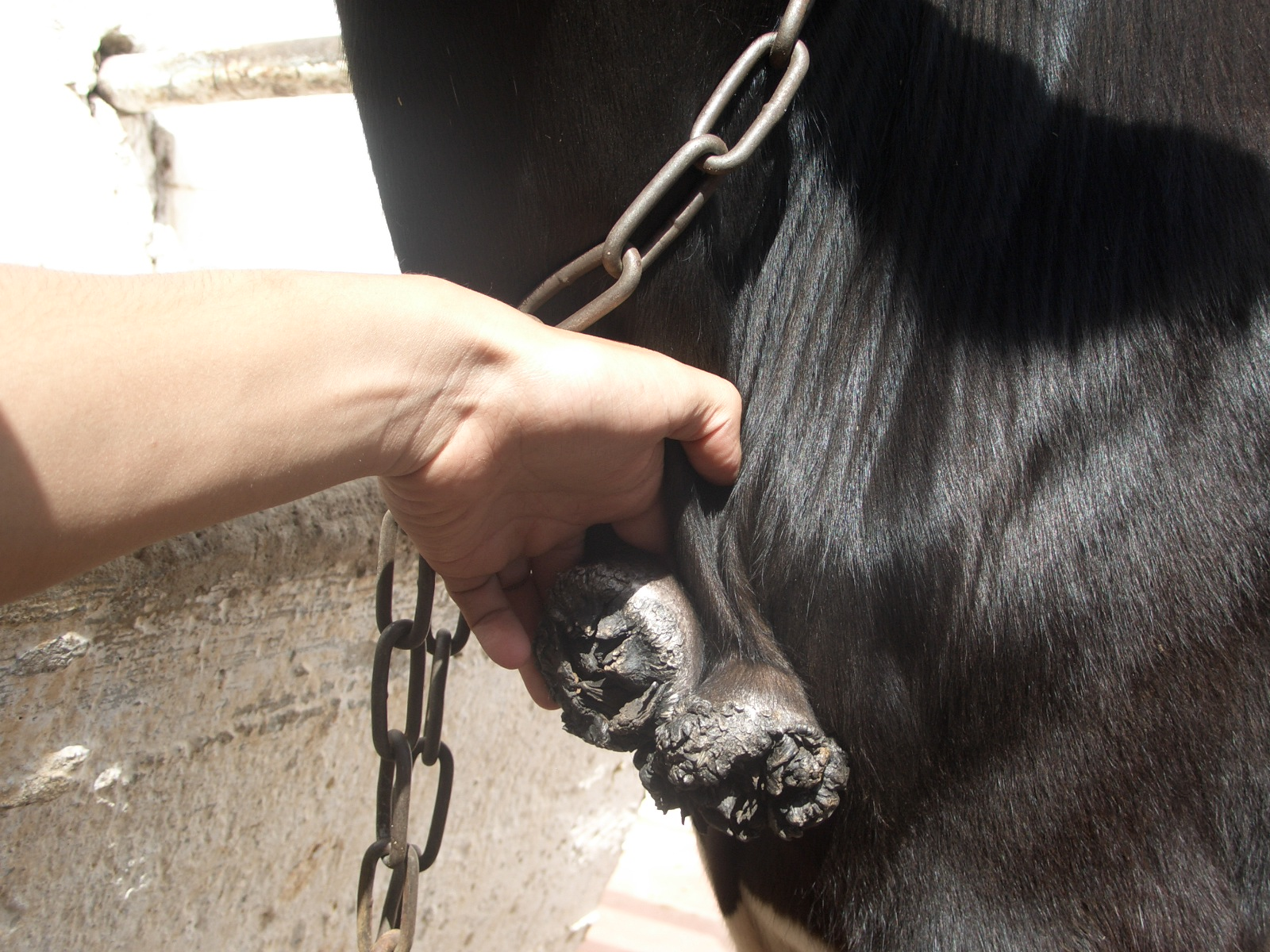
Large warts, showing the cauliflower-like appearance

BPV is highly prevalent, with around 50% of cattle being estimated to bear lesions in the UK. Cutaneous warts are most common in younger animals (under 2 years) and usually spontaneously regress due to the animal's immune response without significant scarring. The duration of infection is very variable (from one month to over a year) and recurrence is possible.

Warts caused by the Xipapillomavirus group have a cauliflower-like appearance and can attain the size of a fist; most common on the head, neck and shoulders, they may also occur in other locations. Cutaneous fibropapillomas caused by Deltapapillomavirus group have a nodular appearance. Although unsightly, most skin warts rarely cause problems except in show animals. However, large warts may bleed, potentially leading to secondary infections, and florid warts of the teat can cause mastitis and interfere with suckling and milking. Fibropapillomas can be troublesome when present in the genital area, causing pain and sometimes loss of reproductive functions as well as interfering with calving. Chronically immunosuppressed animals may develop extensive papillomatosis in the upper gastrointestinal tract, which can cause difficulties with eating and breathing.

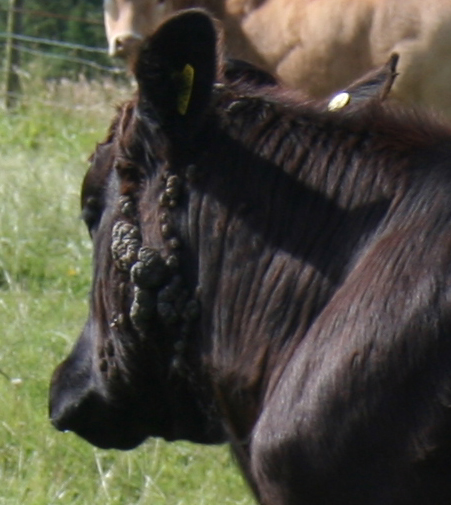
Multiple small facial warts

Warts contain large amounts of infectious virus which is relatively stable. Transmission between animals is common via, for example, fence posts or halters. Warts on the teats of lactating cows are readily transmitted to calves via abrasions. Contaminated tattooing or tagging equipment is another common source of infection.

=== Association with cancer ===
==== Cattle ====
BPV-4 causes squamous cell carcinomas of the alimentary tract, and BPV-1/2 causes carcinomas and haemangioendotheliomas of the urinary bladder, in both cases in animals that have fed on bracken (Pteridium aquilinum). Such cancers are common in locations where grazing land is infested with bracken, such as the western Scottish Highlands, southern Italy and the Nasampolai Valley in Kenya. Bracken contains several immunosuppressants and mutagens, including quercetin and ptaquiloside. Consumption of large quantities by cattle leads to an acute poisoning syndrome with symptoms of bone marrow depletion, while at lower levels of long-term consumption it acts as a cancer cofactor. Carcinogenesis is a multistep process; tumours also contain activated Ras, as well as mutation or downregulation of the tumour suppressor genes p53 in alimentary tract cancers and fragile histidine tetrads (FHIT) in urinary bladder cancers. Viral particles are not produced in either alimentary tract or urinary bladder tumours.

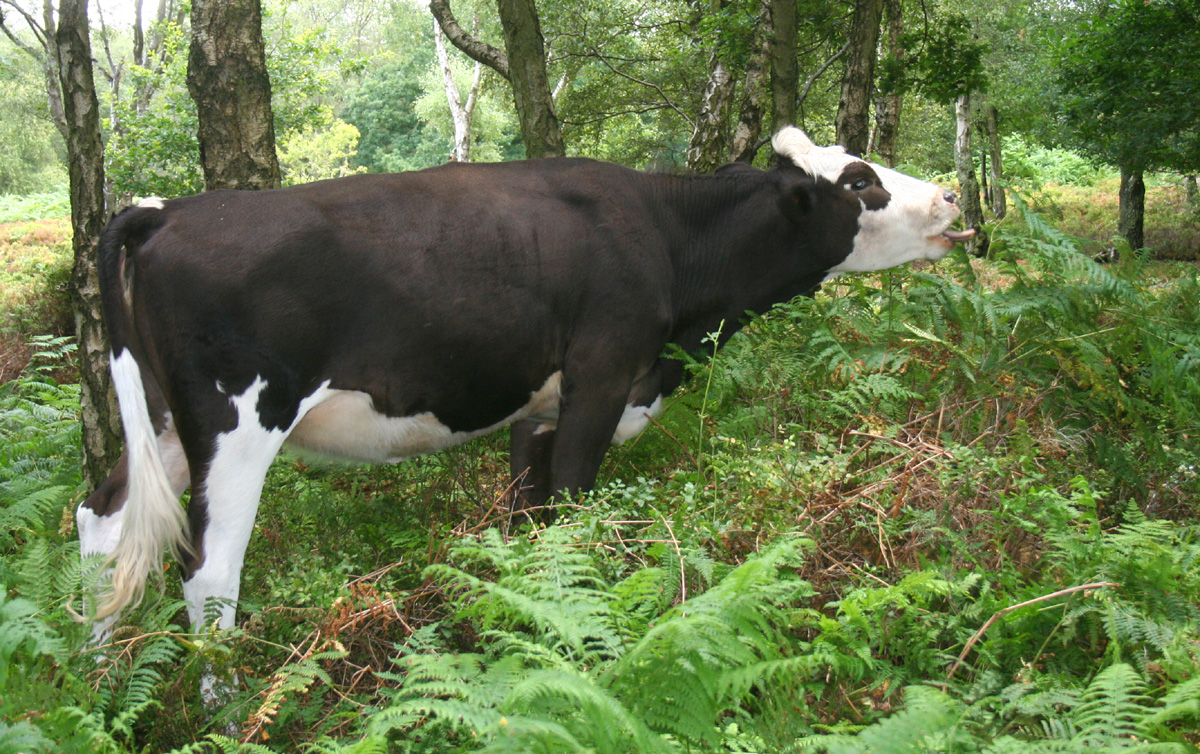
Cows feeding on bracken are at risk of developing BPV-associated cancers

These bracken-associated tumours might form a model for some types of human oesophageal cancer. Human papillomavirus DNA has been detected in around 18% of squamous cell carcinomas of the oesophagus, and there is an association between exposure to or consumption of bracken (which is used as a foodstuff and herbal remedy in South America, China, Japan, Korea and other countries) and risk of developing oesophageal cancer.

==== Other mammals ====
BPV-1 and BPV-2 can also induce sarcomas and fibrosarcomas in other mammals, including equids (equine sarcoid) and, experimentally, rabbits, hamsters and mice (and reviewed in). Viral particles are not produced during infection of other species and, unlike in tumours associated with human papillomavirus, the viral DNA is not integrated into the host genome.

Equine sarcoid, a naturally occurring skin tumour affecting horses, donkeys and mules, is associated with strains of BPV-1/2 which may be equine specific. The lesions can occur anywhere on the body, often multiply, with the limbs, thorax–abdomen, head and paragenital areas being particularly commonly affected. The method of transmission is currently unclear; the involvement of face flies (Musca autumnalis) has been suggested, and transmission via contaminated tack is likely. The disease forms the only known example of natural cross-species infection by a papillomavirus. The involvement of BPV leads to hope that vaccination or antiviral therapy might be possible in the future for this common tumour.

== Treatment, prophylaxis and prevention ==
Treatment is not usually required, as most warts eventually regress spontaneously. Surgical removal is possible but may lead to recurrence. Disinfection with formaldehyde of stalls, fence posts and other environmental virus reservoirs can prevent transmission.

=== Vaccination ===
Vaccines against BPV types 1, 2 and 4 have been developed by M. Saveria Campo and others.

- Prophylactic vaccination (i.e., vaccination of wart-free animals to prevent infection) with whole virus (e.g. formalin-killed wart tissue suspension), virus-like particles (L1 or L1+L2), L1 protein or (for BPV-4) L2 protein confers long-lasting protection against challenge with the same BPV type, but is generally ineffective against existing warts. Protection appears to be mediated via type-specific neutralising antibodies. Vaccination of calves as early as 4–6 weeks might be necessary to prevent infection.
- Therapeutic vaccination (i.e., vaccination of animals with existing warts) with BPV-4 E7 or BPV-2 L2 induces early regression of warts. Wart rejection involves a cell-mediated immune response, with infiltration of the site by large numbers of lymphocytes and macrophages.

These vaccine systems have served as models for the successful development of prophylactic vaccines against the human papillomavirus types associated with cervical and anal cancers. Both Gardasil (a quadrivalent prophylactic HPV vaccine licensed in 2006) and Cervarix (a bivalent prophylactic vaccine license in the EU in 2007 and USA in 2009) contain virus-like particles assembled from L1 protein, an approach successful against BPV, and both vaccines induce sustained immunity. Various therapeutic HPV vaccines based on E6, E7 and L2 are currently in early-stage clinical trials.
