= Xipapillomavirus =

Virus classification
- (unranked): Virus
- Realm: Monodnaviria
- Kingdom: Shotokuvirae
- Phylum: Cossaviricota
- Class: Papovaviricetes
- Order: Zurhausenvirales
- Family: Papillomaviridae
- Genus: Xipapillomavirus

Genus of viruses

Xipapillomavirus is a genus of viruses in the family Papillomaviridae. Bovines serve as natural hosts. There are five species in this genus. Diseases associated with this genus include true papillomas on the cutaneous or mucosal surfaces of cattle.

== Taxonomy ==
The following five species are assigned to the genus:

- Xipapillomavirus 1
- Xipapillomavirus 2
- Xipapillomavirus 3
- Xipapillomavirus 4
- Xipapillomavirus 5

== Structure ==
Viruses in Xipapillomavirus are non-enveloped, with icosahedral geometries, and T=7 symmetry. The diameter is around 52-55 nm. Genomes are circular, around 7kb in length. The genome has 6 open reading frames.

Genus	Structure	Symmetry	Capsid	Genomic arrangement	Genomic segmentation
Xipapillomavirus	Icosahedral	T=7	Non-enveloped	Circular	Monopartite

== Life cycle ==
Viral replication is nuclear. Entry into the host cell is achieved by attachment of the viral proteins to host receptors, which mediates endocytosis. Replication follows the dsDNA bidirectional replication model. DNA-templated transcription, with some alternative splicing mechanism is the method of transcription. The virus exits the host cell by nuclear envelope breakdown. Bovine serve as the natural host. Transmission routes are contact.

Genus	Host details	Tissue tropism	Entry details	Release details	Replication site	Assembly site	Transmission
Xipapillomavirus	Bovines	Epithelial: mucous; epithelial: skin	Cell receptor endocytosis	Lysis	Nucleus	Nucleus	Contact
