= Deer cutaneous fibroma =

Disease of deer

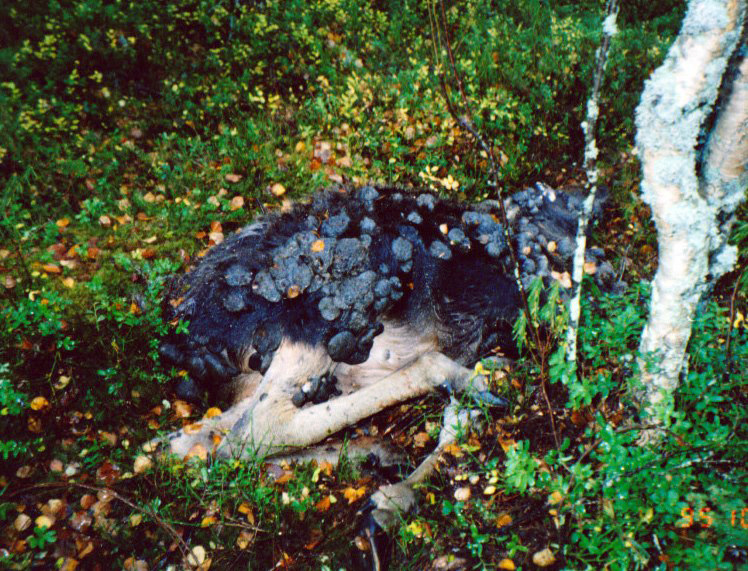
A deceased deer displaying the fibroma in Finland

Cutaneous fibromas (also known as deer warts) are common neoplasms occurring in wild and domestic deer of many species and are caused by host-specific viral infections. The fibromas occur most frequently in animals under 2 years of age, with cases in older deer reported occasionally or rarely.

Deer fibromas appear on the skin as hard and round tumors that can be up to 1 cm in diameter. The tumors are blackish or brown and have a rough-textured surface. They do not cause the animal harm unless clumps of fibromas interfere with breathing, eating, or walking.

Fibromas have been reported in white-tailed deer (Odocoileus virginianus), mule deer (Odocoileus hemionus), fallow deer (Dama dama), red deer (Cervus elaphus), roe deer (Capreolus capreolus), Sika deer (Cervus nippon), moose (Alces alces), and caribou (Rangifer caribou)." They occur across the entirety of the white-tail deer's range.

== Clinical signs and symptoms ==
The only visible signs of cutaneous fibroma in white-tailed deer are fleshy wart-like growths on the skin. These growths can vary from single to clusters of warts. These warts can also vary in size from small to very large. They are only attached to the skin, not to the underlying muscle and bone, so their only physical effects on the deer stem from their ability to impair the deer's sight and range of motion if they are large enough to inhibit normal behavior. Deer with these growths can still be in perfect health and usually show no symptoms of ill health.

== Transmission ==
The fibromas are most often caused by host-specific papillomaviruses. They may also be due to host-specific poxviruses.

The transmission of cutaneous fibromas in the white-tailed deer is caused by a virus that is thought to be transmitted through a variety of insect bites or by a deer coming in contact with any contaminated object that scratches or penetrates the skin of the deer or contaminates wounded/damaged skin. Deer tend to frequent particular trails during their movements, and may thus potentially become infected by contact with objects on the path previously contaminated by other deer. As fibromas occur more commonly in bucks, the virus is probably often transmitted during sparring.

This disease appears temporary, manifesting after about 7 weeks after inoculation and lasting only about two months. Cutaneous fibromas are not transmissible to other livestock or to humans if their meat is consumed.

== Occurrence ==
Fibromas occur most frequently in animals under 2 years of age. The tumor has been diagnosed in 2.1% of males and 0.4% of females. More bucks are shot (either by law or hunter preference), which influences the sampling.

== Treatment and control ==
Treatment is not a feasible option for most wild populations. The disease has not been a problem in captive herds. The growths could be removed surgically if they became important, but that would rarely be an issue. Because exposure to the virus leads to immunity, it should be possible to develop a vaccine if prevention becomes necessary. To date, this disease has been too rare to justify such actions.

== Prognosis ==
Large, ulcerated fibromas are infrequent. In most deer, the fibromas develop to only a few millimeters in diameter. Tumors then regress; this has been observed both in naturally occurring and experimentally induced cases. Only in an occasional deer do they develop into conspicuous skin tumors. Results of a New York survey indicated that wild deer are exposed and develop an immunity to the fibroma virus early in life.

== Significance ==
Fibromatosis is not an important cause of deer mortality. The disease is not known to infect humans. Although they do not harm the meat, fibromas are repulsive to most people, so they discourage them from consuming the deer.

Some domesticated animals (cattle, dogs, etc.) are subject to "warts" common to their species. Fibromatosis of deer is quite unlikely to be infectious to domestic animals.

== See also ==
- Shope papilloma virus
