= Fibropapillomatosis =

Fibropapillomatosis is a disease of several species; see:

- Bovine papillomavirus
- Turtle fibropapillomatosis
