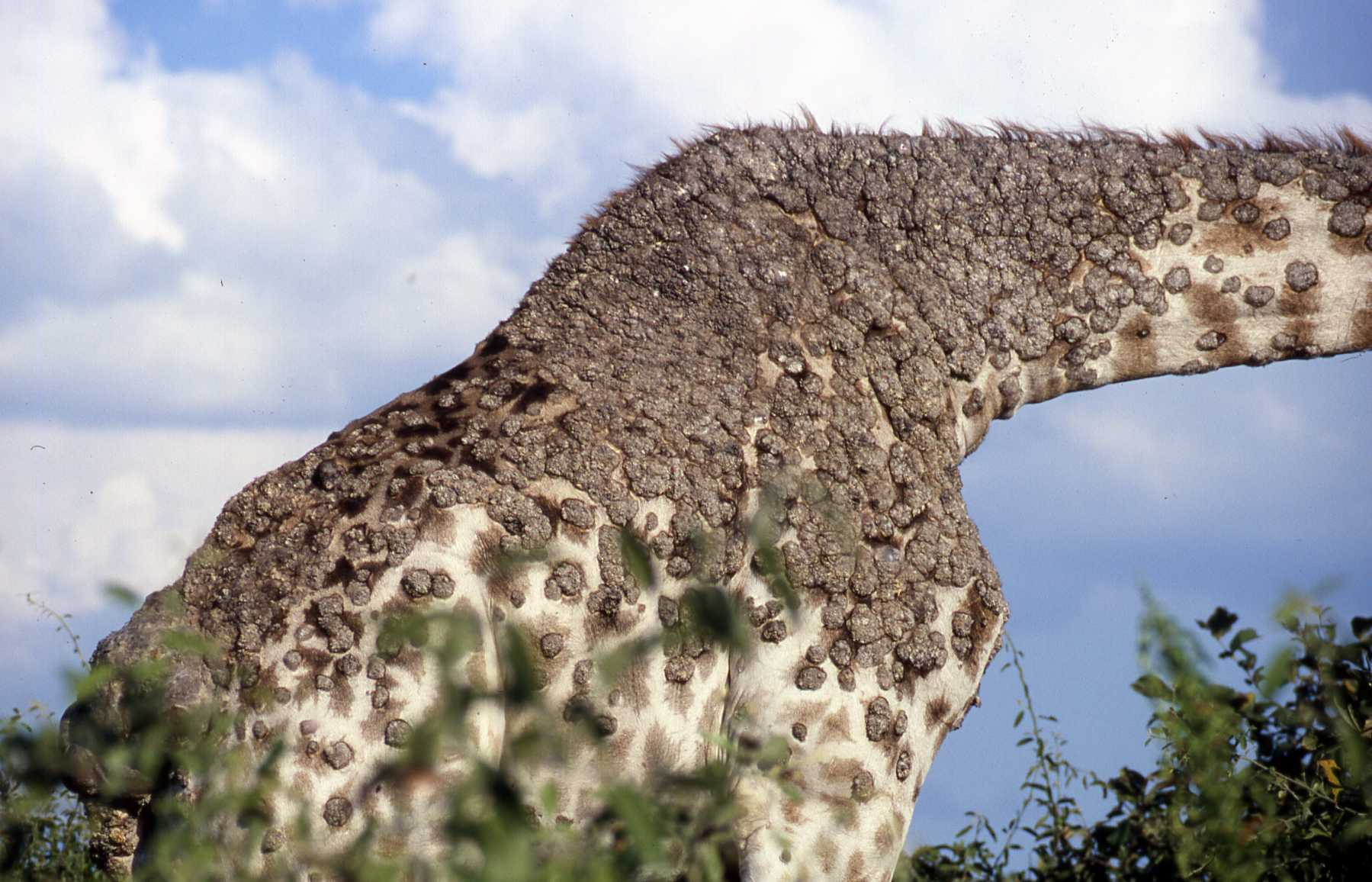
- Giraffe infected with Deltapapillomavirus 7

Virus classification
- (unranked): Virus
- Realm: Floreoviria
- Kingdom: Shotokuvirae
- Phylum: Cossaviricota
- Class: Papovaviricetes
- Order: Zurhausenvirales
- Family: Papillomaviridae
- Genus: Deltapapillomavirus

Species
- See text

= Deltapapillomavirus =

Genus of viruses

Deltapapillomavirus is a genus of viruses in the family Papillomaviridae. Ruminants serve as natural hosts. There are seven species in this genus. Diseases associated with this genus include: warts (papillomas and fibropapillomas) of the skin and alimentary tract (rarely cancers of the alimentary tract and urinary bladder); possibly responsible for the skin tumour equine sarcoid in horses and donkeys.

== Taxonomy ==
The following seven species are assigned to the genus:

- Deltapapillomavirus 1
- Deltapapillomavirus 2
- Deltapapillomavirus 3
- Deltapapillomavirus 4
- Deltapapillomavirus 5
- Deltapapillomavirus 6
- Deltapapillomavirus 7

== Structure ==
Viruses in Deltapapillomavirus are non-enveloped, with icosahedral geometries. The diameter is around 60 nm. Genomes are circular, around 8kb in length.

Genus	Structure	Symmetry	Capsid	Genomic arrangement	Genomic segmentation
Deltapapillomavirus	Icosahedral	T=7	Non-enveloped	Circular	Monopartite

== Life cycle ==
Viral replication is nuclear. Entry into the host cell is achieved by attachment of the viral proteins to host receptors, which mediates endocytosis. Replication follows the dsDNA bidirectional replication model. Dna templated transcription, with some alternative splicing mechanism is the method of transcription. The virus exits the host cell by nuclear envelope breakdown. Ruminants serve as the natural host. Transmission routes are contact.

Genus	Host details	Tissue tropism	Entry details	Release details	Replication site	Assembly site	Transmission
Deltapapillomavirus	Ruminants	Epithelial: mucous; epithelial: skin	Cell receptor endocytosis	Lysis	Nucleus	Nucleus	Contact
