= Saveria Campo =

Italian viral oncologist

- Born: Maria Saveria Campo; 1947 (age 78–79)
- Occupation: Viral oncologist
- Website: www.gla.ac.uk/schools/vet/staff/?action=person&id=4cd5e6ec8a96

Maria Saveria Campo FRSE (born 1947), known as Saveria, is an Italian viral oncologist, known for being the first person to demonstrate an effective papillomavirus vaccine. She developed the vaccine alongside her colleague at the University of Bristol, England, Dr. Richard B.S. Roden. She went on to be recognized for her work and was awarded the position of Fellow of the Royal Society of Edinburgh in 2006. She has worked continuously in the field of Oncology up until her retirement.

== Early life and education ==
Saveria Campo was born in 1947 in Italy. She attended the University of Palermo, Italy. She graduated summa cum laude in 1969 focusing her studies primarily on animal science. Afterwards, she continued her education by pursuing her PhD at the University of Edinburgh in Scotland and graduating in 1973.

== Research ==
After her graduate studies, Campo joined the Beatson Institute for Cancer Research in 1982. The team she worked with at the time were experimenting with how HPV infections can lead to cervical cancer over time. Campo's research group viewed the oncogenic effects of HPV can linger in females for a prolonged period of time, leading to eventual cancer of the body. Campo's team made HPV infections a vital point of their research since over 4,000 deaths a year had been occurring from this type of cancer. While both different in their symptoms, both Bovine Papillomavirus and HPV Infection were deemed by Campo and her team to be similar in how they interacted with their host bodies.

Using her background in animal science, Campo led her team to testing possible vaccines on animal models. They specifically targeted HPV-16 and HPV-18, as these are the strains that are most common to lead to problems in women. Through microscopic sampling, Campo understood how difficult it was for antigens, both in humans and animals, to counteract the virus. She studied bovine and cottontail types as these were the types of animals most affected by HPV. Due to the rarity of cases that arise from HPV infections giving serious health problems, Campo was one of the first women to experiment with these animals in lab conditions relating to disease. She discovered how HPV can remain dormant underneath basal cells after initial infection, and due to the only recently supplied funding, there was no way to test for HPV in the 1900s. After inoculation testing on cattle, Campo was able to derive two different treatments in targeting HPV, rendering it unable to bind to cell receptors. Her work was deemed as a great success in terms of managing one of the ways that cancer can infiltrate human bodies.

=== Overall impact ===
In the following years, the vaccine made by Campo and her team was mass produced by Merck & Co. under the name Gardasil in 2006. The vaccine is recommended for those under the age of 26 and who have immunocompromising conditions. More than 270 million doses of the vaccine have been given worldwide and 80% of HPV cases have dropped as a result of Campo's work.

== Later life ==
In 1999, Campo left her job in cancer research and started to work as a full-time faculty member at the University of Glasgow in the field of Veterinary medicine. She then went on to become a Professor of Viral Oncology until 2009, when she finally retired.
