= Bandicoot papillomatosis carcinomatosis virus =

DNA virus

Bandicoot papillomatosis carcinomatosis viruses are a pair of circular double-stranded DNA virus isolated from bandicoots (Perameles bougainville). The genomes have features similar to viruses in the families Papillomaviridae and the Polyomaviridae. Two strains have been described to date, bandicoot papillomatosis carcinomatosis virus 1 and bandicoot papillomatosis carcinomatosis virus 2.

== Genome ==
The genome is ~7.5 kilobases in length with a G+C content of ~35%. Two structural genes are present: L1 and L2. The non structural genes are found on the opposite strand. The L1 gene encodes a protein with 506 residues and the L2 encodes a protein with 470 residues. The two non structural genes T (742 amino acid residues) and t (224 amino acid residues). The capsid proteins resemble those of marsupial papillomaviruses while the T and t antigens resemble those of the avian polyomaviruses.

== Evolution ==
These viruses evolved via a recombination event between a papillomavirus and a polyomavirus between 10 million years ago and 50 million years ago.

== Clinical ==
These viruses were isolated from and are thought to cause a progressively debilitating cutaneous and mucocutaneous papillomatosis and carcinomatosis syndrome. The lesions that occur in this disease are irregular thickenings and masses over the skin of the digits, body, pouch, and mucocutaneous junctions of the lips and conjunctiva. Cases have been described in both captive and wild individuals.
