= Skin cancer in horses =

Skin cancer, or neoplasia, is the most common type of cancer diagnosed in horses, accounting for 45 to 80% of all cancers diagnosed. Sarcoids are the most common type of skin neoplasm and are the most common type of cancer overall in horses. Squamous-cell carcinoma is the second-most prevalent skin cancer, followed by melanoma. Squamous-cell carcinoma and melanoma usually occur in horses greater than 9-years-old, while sarcoids commonly affect horses 3 to 6 years old. Surgical biopsy is the method of choice for diagnosis of most equine skin cancers, but is contraindicated for cases of sarcoids. Prognosis and treatment effectiveness varies based on type of cancer, degree of local tissue destruction, evidence of spread to other organs (metastasis) and location of the tumor. Not all cancers metastasize and some can be cured or mitigated by surgical removal of the cancerous tissue or through use of chemotherapeutic drugs.

== Sarcoids ==
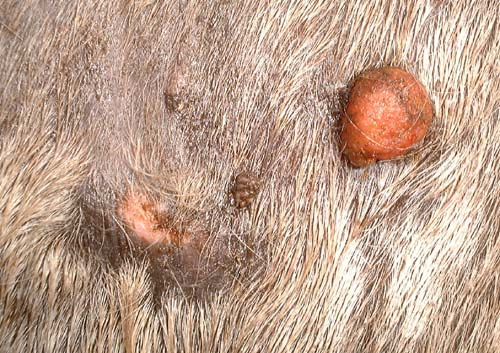
Occult (hairless area at left) and nodular (large round bump at right) forms of equine sarcoids

Sarcoids account for 39.9% of all equine cancers and are the most common cancer diagnosed in horses. There is no breed predilection for developing sarcoids and they can occur at any age, with horses three to six years old being the most common age group and males being slightly more prone to developing the disease. Sarcoids are also more prevalent in certain familial lines, suggesting that there may be a heritable component. Several studies have found an association between the presence of Bovine papillomavirus-1 and 2 and associated viral growth proteins in skin cells with sarcoid formation, but the exact mechanism that controls or induces epidermal proliferation remains unknown. However, high viral loads within cells are strongly correlated with more severe clinical signs and aggressive lesions.

=== Clinical signs ===
The appearance and number of sarcoids can vary, with some horses having single or multiple lesions, usually on the head, legs, ventrum and genitalia or around a wound. The distribution pattern suggests that flies are an important factor in the formation of sarcoids. Sarcoids may resemble warts (verrucous form), small nodules (nodular form), oval hairless or scaly plaques (occult form) or very rarely, large ulcerated masses (fibroblastic form). The occult form usually presents on skin around the mouth, eyes or neck, while nodular and verrucous sarcoids are common on the groin, penile sheath or face. Fibroblastic sarcoids have a predilection for the legs, groin, eyelid and sites of previous injury. Multiple forms may also be present on an individual horse (mixed form). Histologically, sarcoids are composed of fibroblasts (collagen producing cells) that invade and proliferate within the dermis and sometimes the subcutaneous tissue but do not readily metastasize to other organs. Surgical biopsy can definitively diagnose sarcoids, but there is a significant risk of making sarcoids worse. Therefore, diagnosis based solely on clinical signs, fine-needle aspiration or complete excisional biopsy are safer choices.

=== Treatment ===
While sarcoids may spontaneously regress regardless of treatment in some instances, course and duration of disease is highly unpredictable and should be considered on a case-by-case basis taking into account cost of the treatment and severity of clinical signs. Surgical removal alone is not effective, with recurrence occurring in 50 to 64% of cases, but removal is often done in conjunction with other treatments. Topical treatment with products containing bloodroot extract (from the plant Sanguinaria canadensis) for 7 to 10 days has been reported to be effective in removing small sarcoids, but the salve's caustic nature may cause pain and the sarcoid must be in an area where a bandage can be applied. Freezing sarcoids with liquid nitrogen (cryotherapy) is another affordable method, but may result in scarring or depigmentation. Topical application of the anti-metabolite 5-fluorouracil has also obtained favorable results, but it usually takes 30 to 90 days of repeated application before any effect can be realized. Injection of small sarcoids (usually around the eyes) with the chemotherapeutic agent cisplatin and the immunomodulator BCG have also achieved some success. In one trial, BCG was 69% effective in treating nodular and small fibroblastic sarcoids around the eye when repeatedly injected into the lesion and injection with cisplatin was 33% effective overall (mostly in horses with nodular sarcoids). However, BCG treatment carries a risk of allergic reaction in some horses and cisplatin has a tendency to leak out of sarcoids during repeated dosing. External beam radiation can also be used on small sarcoids, but is often impractical. Cisplatin electrochemotherapy (the application of an electrical field to the sarcoid after the injection of cisplatin, with the horse under general anesthesia), when used with or without prior surgery to remove the sarcoid, had a non-recurrence rate after four years of 97.9% in one retrospective study. There is a chance of sarcoid recurrence for all modalities even after apparently successful treatment. While sarcoids are not fatal, large aggressive tumors that destroy surrounding tissue can cause discomfort and loss of function and be resistant to treatment, making euthanasia justifiable in some instances. Sarcoids may be the most common skin-related reason for euthanasia.

== Squamous-cell carcinoma ==
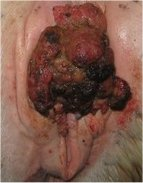
Squamous-cell carcinoma on the vulva of a gray mare, possibly arising from the clitoris. The tumor is ulcerated and has multiple necrotic areas (black spots).

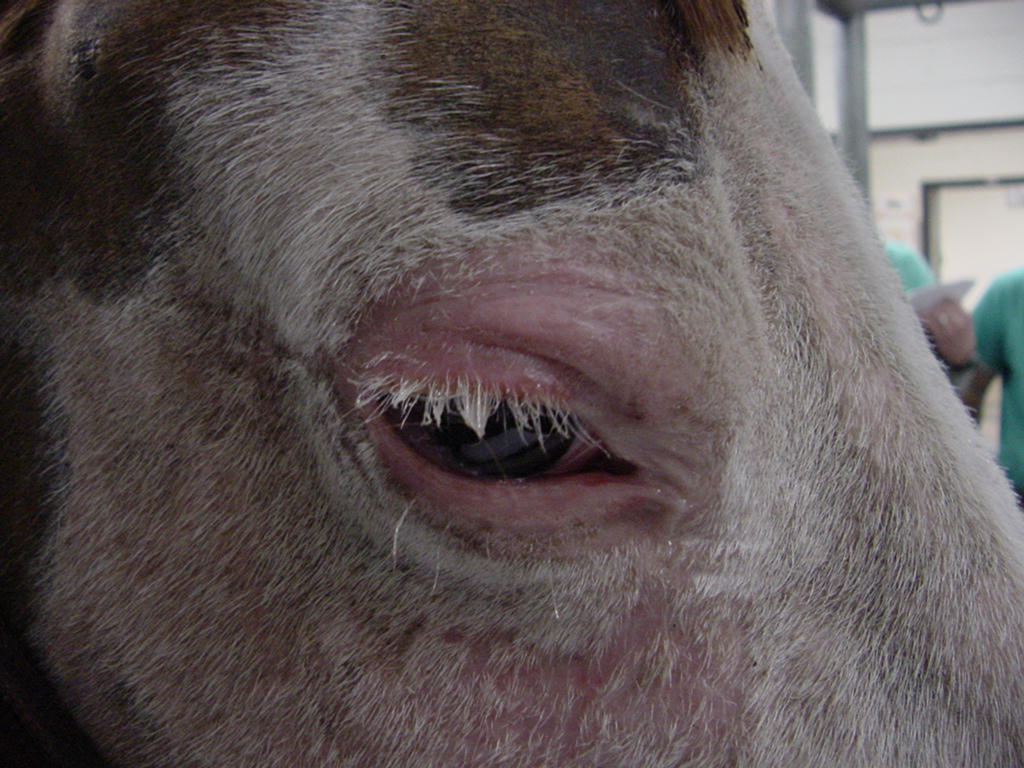
Smooth, raised plaque on upper eyelid of a Paint horse. This horse developed a carcinoma secondary to sunburn (termed solar keratosis carcinoma in situ).

Squamous-cell carcinoma (SCC) is the most common cancer of the eye, periorbital area and penis, and it is the second most common cancer overall in horses, accounting for 12 to 20% of all cancers diagnosed. While SCC has been reported in horses aged 1 to 29-years, most cases occur in 8 to 15-year-old horses, making it the most common neoplasm reported in older horses. Carcinomas are tumors derived from epithelial cells and SCC results from transformation and proliferation of squames, epidermal skin cells that become keratinized. Squamous-cell carcinomas are often solitary, slow-growing tumors that cause extensive local tissue destruction. They can metastasize to other organs, with reported rates as high as 18.6%, primarily to the lymph nodes and lung.

=== Clinical signs and predisposing factors ===
Tumors related to squamous-cell carcinoma (SCC) can appear anywhere on the body, but they are most often located in non-pigmented skin near mucocutaneous junctions (where skin meets mucous membranes) such as on the eyelids, around the nostrils, lips, vulva, prepuce, penis or anus. The tumors are raised, fleshy, often ulcerated or infected and may have an irregular surface. Rarely, primary SCC develops in the esophagus, stomach (non-glandular portion), nasal passages and sinuses, the hard palate, gums, guttural pouches and lung. The eyelid is the most common site, accounting for 40-50% of cases, followed by male (25-10% of cases) and female (10% of cases) genitalia. Horses with lightly pigmented skin, such as those with a gray hair coat or white faces, are especially prone to developing SCC, and some breeds, such as Clydesdales, may have a genetic predisposition. Exposure of light-colored skin to UV light has often been cited as a predisposing factor, but lesions can occur in dark skin and in areas that are not usually exposed to sunlight, such as around the anus. Buildup of smegma ("the bean" in horseman's terms) on the penis is also linked to SCC and is thought to be a carcinogen through penile irritation. Pony geldings and work horses are more prone to developing SCC on the penis, due to less frequent penile washing when compared to stallions. Equine papillomavirus-2 has also been found within penile SCCs, but has not been determined to cause SCC.

=== Treatment and prevention of SCC ===
Before treatment of squamous-cell carcinoma (SCC) is initiated, evidence of metastasis must be determined either by palpation and aspiration of lymph nodes around the mass or, in smaller horses, radiographs of the thorax. Small tumors found early in the disease process (most frequently on the eyelid) can be treated with cisplatin or radiation with favorable results. For more advanced cases, surgical removal of eye (enucleation), mass or penile amputation can be curative provided all cancerous cells are removed (wide margins obtained) and there is no metastasis. However, young horses (usually geldings less than 8-years-old) that have a hard or "wooden" texture to SCCs on the glans penis have a very poor prognosis for treatment and recovery.

Regular washing of the penis and prepuce in males as well as cleaning the clitoral fossa (the groove around the clitoris) in mares is recommended to remove smegma buildup, which also gives the opportunity for inspection for suspicious growths on the penis or on the vulva.

== Melanoma ==
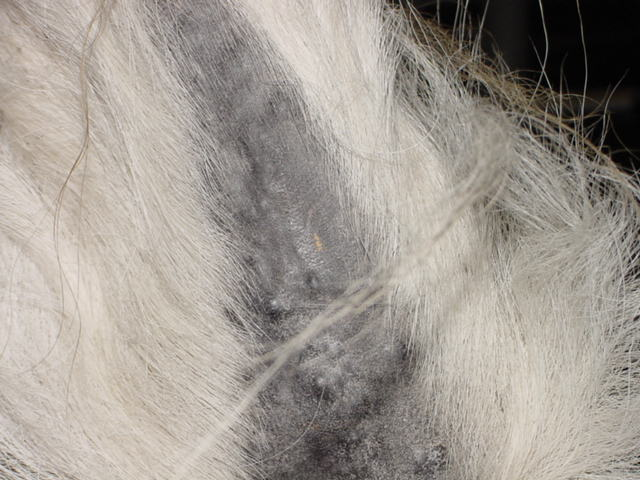
Multiple nodules at the tail-base.

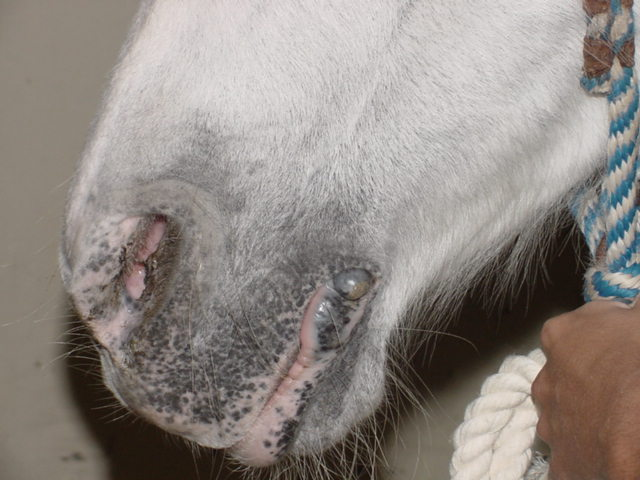
Small nodules at the lip commissure.

Common sites for melanoma

Equine melanoma results from abnormal proliferation and accumulation of melanocytes, pigmented cells within the dermis. Gray horses over 6-years-old are especially prone to developing melanoma. The prevalence of melanoma in gray horses over 15 years old has been estimated at 80%. One survey of Camargue-type horses found an overall population prevalence of 31.4%, with prevalence increasing to 67% in horses over 15 years old. Up to 66% of melanomas in gray horses are benign, but melanotic tumors in horses with darker hair-coats may be more aggressive and are more often malignant. One retrospective study of cases sent to a referral hospital reported a 14% prevalence of metastatic melanoma within the study population. However, the actual prevalence of metastatic melanoma may be lower due to infrequent submission of melanotic tumors for diagnosis. Common sites for metastasis include lymph nodes, the liver, spleen, lung, skeletal muscle, blood vessels and parotid salivary gland.

=== Clinical signs ===
The most common sites for melanotic tumors are on the under-side of the tail near the base, on the prepuce, around the mouth or in the skin over the parotid gland (near the base of the ear). Tumors will initially begin as single, small raised areas that may multiply or coalesce into multi-lobed masses (a process called melanomatosis) over time. Horses under 2-years-old can be born with or acquire benign melanotic tumors (called melanocytomas), but these tumors are often located on the legs or trunk, not beneath the tail as in older animals.

=== Treatment of melanoma ===
Treatment of small melanomas is often not necessary, but large tumors can cause discomfort and are usually surgically removed. Cisplatin and cryotherapy can be used to treat small tumors less than 3 centimeters, but tumors may reoccur. Cimetidine, a histamine stimulator, can cause tumors to regress in some horses, but may take up to 3 months to produce results and multiple treatments may be needed throughout the horse's life. There are few viable treatment options for horses with metastatic melanoma. However, gene therapy injections utilizing interleukin-12 and 18-encoding DNA plasmids have shown promise in slowing the progression of tumors in patients with metastatic melanoma.

== Other types of skin cancer ==
=== Lymphoma ===
Lymphoma is the most common type of blood-related cancer in horses and while it can affect horses of all ages, it typically occurs in horses aged 4–11 years.

== Bibliography ==
- Beuchner-Maxwell, Virginia (2009). "Chapter 151: Skin tumors". In Norman Edward Robinson and Kim A. Sprayberry (ed.). Current therapy in equine medicine (6 ed.). St. Louis: Elsevier Health Sciences. pp. 692–697. ISBN 978-1-4160-5475-7.
- Giuliano, Elizabeth A. (2009). "Chapter 139: Ocular squamous cell carcinoma". In Norman Edward Robinson and Kim A. Sprayberry (ed.). Current therapy in equine medicine (6 ed.). St. Louis: Elsevier Health Sciences. pp. 639–644. ISBN 978-1-4160-5475-7.
- Knottenbelt, Derek C.; John W. McGarry (2009). "Chapter 18: Neoplastic conditions". Pascoe's principles and practice of equine dermatology. London: WB Saunders. pp. 377–439. ISBN 978-0-7020-2881-6.
- Pascoe, Reginald R.; Derek C. Knottenbelt (1999). "Equine Sarcoids". Manual of equine dermatology. London: WB Saunders. pp. 244–252. ISBN 978-0-7020-1968-5.
- Rooney, James R.; John L. Robertson (1996). "Melanoma". Equine Pathology. Ames: Iowa State University Press. pp. 304–305. ISBN 9780813823348.
- Valentine, Beth A. (2006). "Chapter 13: Neoplasia". In Joseph Bertone (ed.). Equine geriatric medicine and surgery. St. Louis: Elsevier Health Sciences. pp. 147–167. ISBN 978-0721601632.
