= Papovaviricetes =

Virus classification
- (unranked): Virus
- Realm: Monodnaviria
- Kingdom: Shotokuvirae
- Phylum: Cossaviricota
- Class: Papovaviricetes

Orders
- See text

Class of viruses

Papovaviricetes is a class of viruses. The class shares the name of an abolished family, Papovaviridae, which was split in 1999 into the two families Papillomaviridae and Polyomaviridae. The class was established in 2019 and takes its name from the former family.

== Orders ==
The following orders are recognized:

- Sepolyvirales
- Zurhausenvirales

== See also ==
- Bandicoot papillomatosis carcinomatosis virus
