= Cossaviricota =

Virus classification
- (unranked): Virus
- Realm: Monodnaviria
- Kingdom: Shotokuvirae
- Phylum: Cossaviricota

Classes
- See text

Phylum of viruses

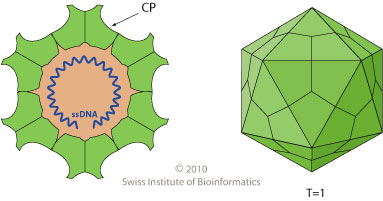
Schematic drawing of a virion of the family Parvoviridae, cross-section and side view

Cossaviricota is a phylum of viruses. The phylum is named after Yvonne Cossart who discovered Parvovirus B19, the causative pathogen of fifth disease.

== Classes ==
The following classes are recognized:

- Mouviricetes
- Papovaviricetes
- Quintoviricetes
