= Joseph Berger (neurologist) =

American internist and neurologist (born 1951)

- Born: April 19, 1951 (age 75)
- Education: Pennsylvania State University, Jefferson Medical College
- Known for: Discovered using Oxandrolone for the treatment of AIDS; Research on Progressive Multifocal Leukoencephalopathy (PML), and MS (Multiple Sclerosis)
- Spouse: Sandra T. Berger
- Children: 3

Joseph Robert Berger (born 1951) is an American internist and neurologist whose research has focused on progressive multifocal leukoencephalopathy (PML), the neurological complications of HIV/AIDS, multiple sclerosis (MS) and other inflammatory disorders of the brain. He is an emeritus professor of neurology at the University of Pennsylvania's Perelman School of Medicine, the University of Kentucky College of Medicine and the University of Miami. At Penn he was chief and later associate chief of the Multiple Sclerosis Division, and he was chair of the Department of Neurology at the University of Kentucky from 1995 to 2013. He was lead author of a 2013 consensus statement on diagnostic criteria for PML from the American Academy of Neurology's Neuroinfectious Disease Section, and of a placebo-controlled trial of the anabolic steroid oxandrolone for AIDS-associated wasting.

== Early life and education ==
Berger attended the Pennsylvania State University – Jefferson Medical College Five-Year Accelerated Medical Program, receiving a bachelor's degree from Penn State in 1972 and his medical degree from Jefferson Medical College in 1974. He graduated from Penn State summa cum laude and is a member of the Alpha Omega Alpha medical honor society.

He completed an internship and residency in internal medicine at Georgetown University Hospital in Washington, D.C. (1974–1977), then trained in neurology at Hadassah Hospital of the Hebrew University in Jerusalem (1977–1978) and at Jackson Memorial Hospital, University of Miami School of Medicine (1978–1981). He is board certified in internal medicine (1977) and in neurology (1983).

== Career ==
=== University of Miami ===
In 1981, Berger joined the faculty of the University of Miami School of Medicine, serving in the departments of both neurology and internal medicine, and remained there until 1995. He began studying the neurological complications of HIV/AIDS at the start of the AIDS pandemic and held the Thomas E. Whigham/Joseph R. Berger Endowed Chair, described as the first endowed chair for the study of the neurological complications of HIV/AIDS. As a member of the AIDS Clinical Trials Group, he was involved in directing neuro-AIDS clinical research in the United States.

=== University of Kentucky ===
From 1995 to 2013, he was chair of the Department of Neurology at the University of Kentucky College of Medicine, where he held the Ruth L. Works Professorship and founded and directed the university's multiple sclerosis program. He also founded the Commonwealth Neurological Society for neurologists in Kentucky. At Kentucky he continued his research on the neurological complications of HIV/AIDS, building a neuro-AIDS research group; his Kentucky co-authors included Avindra Nath and Malcolm Avison.

=== University of Pennsylvania ===
In 2014, he joined the faculty of the Perelman School of Medicine, University of Pennsylvania, as professor of neurology and chief of the Multiple Sclerosis Division. He later served as associate chief of the division and became an emeritus professor at Penn, where his listed clinical areas are multiple sclerosis, neuroimmunology, neurovirology, encephalopathy and HIV/AIDS. He also holds emeritus status at the University of Kentucky College of Medicine and the University of Miami.

=== Work in Ethiopia ===
Berger has been involved in neurological education and research in Ethiopia. In 1999, he and Enawgaw Mehari, then a neurology resident at Kentucky, co-chaired a United Nations–sponsored colloquium in Addis Ababa on the challenges of AIDS in Africa; the two then founded People to People to continue its work. The non-profit organization works to improve health care and reduce AIDS in Africa, particularly in Ethiopia. He is an honorary professor in the Department of Neurology at Addis Ababa University and lectured at the 2010 International Neuroinfectious Disease Conference in Addis Ababa.

=== Professional service ===
Berger co-founded and chaired the first international conference on the neurological complications of HIV, the Neuroscience of HIV meeting, which was later merged into the meetings of the International Society for NeuroVirology (ISNV). He has served on the ISNV's board of directors and was appointed chair of the American Academy of Neurology's Joint Audit Committee for its 2011–2013 term. He was one of the founding editors of the Journal of NeuroVirology and later served as an associate editor; he has also been a member of the editorial boards of Multiple Sclerosis and Related Disorders and the journal Neuroscience, and has served as editor-in-chief of the Multiple Sclerosis Resource Center of the medical news service MDedge.

== Research ==
=== Neurological complications of HIV/AIDS ===
Berger's research interests include the neurological complications of HIV/AIDS, PML and the interface of multiple sclerosis and infections. His published observations include the effect of HIV co-infection on the presentation of neurosyphilis, a multiple sclerosis–like illness occurring with HIV infection, and the involvement of the basal ganglia in HIV dementia.

In 1996, Berger and colleagues reported a multicenter, double-blind, placebo-controlled trial in 63 HIV-positive men who had lost more than 10% of their body weight. Oxandrolone had a positive effect on weight and well-being compared with placebo, although no measurable gain in muscle strength was seen at the doses studied. Berger is the named inventor on United States patents for the use of oxandrolone to treat HIV-associated muscle weakness and wasting.

=== Progressive multifocal leukoencephalopathy ===
In 1987, he and colleagues published in the Annals of Internal Medicine a review of the literature and a report of 16 cases of PML associated with HIV infection. He went on to report prolonged survival and partial recovery in AIDS-associated PML, PML in HIV-infected children, a series of 154 HIV-associated cases, and factors that predict prolonged survival. He has also examined why PML occurs far more often in AIDS than in other immunosuppressive conditions.

After PML was recognized as a complication of natalizumab treatment for multiple sclerosis and Crohn's disease in 2005, he and Igor Koralnik wrote a New England Journal of Medicine editorial that year on the emergence of PML in patients treated with natalizumab, and he later reviewed the lessons of AIDS and natalizumab for drug-associated PML. In 2013, he was lead author of the consensus statement of the American Academy of Neurology's Neuroinfectious Disease Section on PML diagnostic criteria, which set out separate histopathological and clinical routes to diagnosis and classified cases as certain, probable, possible or not PML. He is a member of an international panel convened to review, update and expand those criteria.

=== Other clinical research ===
Berger has also written on the neurological complications of bariatric surgery, the neurological manifestations of scleromyxedema, and, during the COVID-19 pandemic, the effects of SARS-CoV-2 infection on the nervous system.

=== Economics of neurological care ===
Berger has written on the financial contribution of multiple sclerosis specialists to academic medical centers. His 2017 analysis in Neurology: Clinical Practice estimated that one full-time MS specialist may generate more than $8 million a year in downstream revenue for an academic institution, and a 2021 review with colleagues concluded that MS neurologists are significantly undercompensated relative to other neurological specialists, in part because the contribution margin they generate is generally not considered in their compensation. He has discussed the subject in interviews and in an episode of the Association of University Professors of Neurology's Leading Edge podcast.

== Honors and awards ==
He is a fellow of the American Academy of Neurology, the American Neurological Association and the American College of Physicians. His honors include:

- George Pfaff Award for Outstanding Teaching, University of Miami School of Medicine (1985)
- Outstanding Educator Award, University of Kentucky (annually, 1996–1998), and Master Teacher Award (1998)
- Distinguished Teaching at Minority Institutions Award, African American Neurological Association (1999)
- Raymond D. Adams Lectureship, American Neurological Association (2014)
- Pioneer in NeuroVirology Award, International Society for NeuroVirology (2015; the 12th such award)
- Distinguished Neurology Teacher Award, American Neurological Association (2015)
- Alumni Achievement Award, Sidney Kimmel Medical College, Thomas Jefferson University (2018)
- John F. Kurtzke Memorial Lecture, Consortium of Multiple Sclerosis Centers (2022)
- Life Time Recognition Award for Extraordinary Talents and Service, People to People
- Honorary member, Colombian Neurological Association

== Publications ==
Berger has published more than 250 refereed papers and more than 100 book chapters, and has co-edited four textbooks:

- Berger, Joseph R.; Levy, Robert M., eds. (1997). AIDS and the Nervous System (2nd ed.). Philadelphia: Lippincott-Raven. ISBN 978-0-7817-0309-3.
- Nath, Avindra; Berger, Joseph R., eds. (2003). Clinical Neurovirology. Neurological Disease and Therapy. Vol. 60. New York: Marcel Dekker. ISBN 978-0-8247-4081-8.
- Portegies, Peter; Berger, Joseph R., eds. (2007). HIV/AIDS and the Nervous System. Handbook of Clinical Neurology. Vol. 85 (3rd series ed.). Edinburgh: Elsevier. ISBN 978-0-444-52010-4.
- Nath, Avindra; Berger, Joseph R., eds. (2020). Clinical Neurovirology (2nd ed.). Boca Raton: CRC Press. ISBN 978-1-4987-3316-8.
