= Janice E. Clements =

American biologist, academic and medical researcher

Janice Ellen Clements
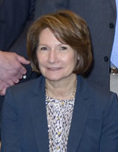
- Education: University of Maryland, College
- Scientific career
- Fields: Virology
- Workplaces: Johns Hopkins University

Janice Ellen Clements is vice dean for faculty at the Johns Hopkins School of Medicine and the Mary Wallace Stanton Professor of Faculty Affairs. She is a professor in the departments of Molecular and Comparative Pathobiology, Neurology, and Pathology, and has a joint appointment in molecular biology and genetics. Her molecular biology and virology research examines lentiviruses and how they cause neurological diseases.

== Training and career ==
Clements earned a PhD in biochemistry from the University of Maryland. She pursued post-doctoral work at Johns Hopkins during the 1970s, working first with Bernard Weiss and then with Opendra "Bill" Narayan and Richard T. Johnson. Along with Diane Griffin and others, Clements was one of several trainees of Johnson who went on to notable academic careers at Johns Hopkins.

Clements became a faculty member at Johns Hopkins in 1978 as an assistant professor in the Department of Neurology and became a full professor in 1990, the 24th woman to achieve this rank at the Johns Hopkins School of Medicine. Clements joined the Division of Comparative Medicine in 1988 and headed its retrovirus laboratory from 1992. Clements successfully convinced the school to elevate the division to department-level status, and in 2002 became the first director of the new department, later renamed the Department of Molecular and Comparative Pathobiology.

In 2000, Clements was appointed vice dean for the School of Medicine, taking over the duties of Catherine D. DeAngelis, who had left Johns Hopkins to become the first woman editor-in-chief of the Journal of the American Medical Association.

Clements stepped down as director of Molecular and Comparative Pathobiology in 2008. She was succeeded by Chris Zink, a longtime colleague of Clements.

== Research ==
Clements has conducted and led research into numerous viruses, concentrating on the animal lentiviruses. Lentiviruses are a complex type of retroviruses, and include the human immunodeficiency viruses HIV-1 and HIV-2. Clements was the first to characterize the complex genome of the lentiviruses, describing the genomic structure of visna virus, a lentivirus of sheep. She performed similar work with caprine arthritis encephalitis virus (CAEV), a closely related virus of goats.

With the discovery of AIDS and its cause, HIV, Clements' work took on a new dimension of relevance. In 1985, she published an article with HIV co-discoverer Robert Gallo and others describing the relationship of HIV to visna virus. This article helped to establish HIV as a lentivirus, not a leukemia virus as was originally thought. At the time, the origin of HIV was unknown, and Clements' work presented the possibility that HIV could have been transferred to humans from animals. Later, it was found that simian immunodeficiency virus (SIV) strains from chimpanzee and monkey hosts were the likely progenitors of HIV.

In addition to her work with visna and CAEV, Clements has conducted extensive research into SIV and HIV. Clements and her laboratory have published over 160 scientific articles. Alongside collaborators including Chris Zink, Joseph L. Mankowski, and Kenneth Witwer, Clements has investigated the innate immune response to retrovirus infection in an animal model of HIV encephalitis. Her recent work includes the use of minocycline, a common antibiotic often used against acne, to protect against viral encephalitis and slow viral replication. With Zink, Mankowski and HIV researchers Joel Blankson and Bob Siliciano, Clements has also developed a model of highly active antiretroviral therapy to study viral reservoirs: where HIV conceals itself in the body.

== Advocacy ==
Clements has advocated and fostered the creation of opportunities and supportive environments for women in academia. She is a member of the steering committee of the Johns Hopkins Women's Leadership Council.

In 2005, the Johns Hopkins School of Medicine celebrated the promotion of the 100th woman to the rank of full professor in a ceremony organized by Clements and others at Johns Hopkins. The event was entitled "The Legacy of Mary Elizabeth Garrett, 100 Women Professors at Johns Hopkins Medicine" to honor the woman whose financial gift allowed the school of medicine to begin its first cohort of medical students in 1893. Garrett herself had stressed the importance of equal opportunity in medical education, specifying that the school must allow women and men alike to seek admission and "prizes, dignities or honor that are awarded by competitive examination, or regarded as rewards of merit."
