= VLA-4 =

Integrin dimer

Integrin alpha-4

Identifiers
- Symbol: ITGA4
- Alt. names: CD49 antigen-like family member D
- NCBI gene: 3676
- HGNC: 6140
- OMIM: 192975
- RefSeq: NP_000876
- UniProt: P13612

Other data
- Locus: Chr. 2 q31.3
Search for
- Structures: Swiss-model
- Domains: InterPro

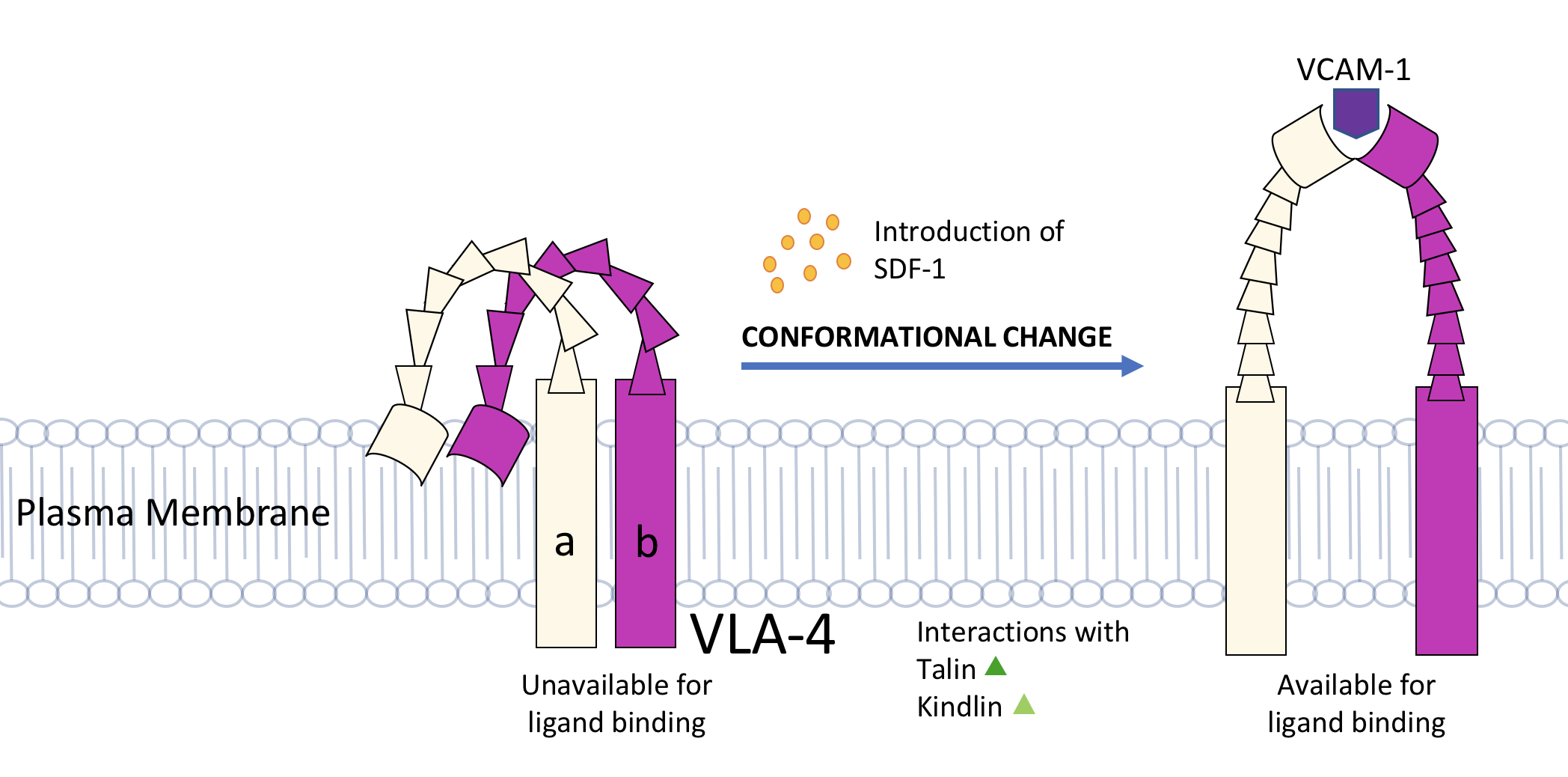
The alpha and beta subunits change conformation in response to chemokines like SDF-1 in order to interact with ligands such as VCAM-1.

Integrin beta-1

Identifiers
- Symbol: ITGB1
- Alt. symbols: CD29
- Alt. names: Fibronectin receptor subunit beta
- NCBI gene: 3688
- HGNC: 6153
- OMIM: 135630
- RefSeq: NP_002202
- UniProt: P05556

Other data
- Locus: Chr. 10 p11.22
Search for
- Structures: Swiss-model
- Domains: InterPro

Integrin α4β1 (very late antigen-4) is an integrin dimer. It is composed of CD49d (alpha 4) and CD29 (beta 1). The alpha 4 subunit is 155 kDa, and the beta 1 subunit is 150 kDa.

== Function ==
The integrin VLA-4 is expressed on the cell surfaces of stem cells, progenitor cells, T and B cells, monocytes, natural killer cells, eosinophils, but not neutrophils. It functions to promote an inflammatory response by the immune system by assisting in the movement of leukocytes to tissue that requires inflammation. It is a key player in cell adhesion.

However, VLA-4 does not adhere to its appropriate ligands until the leukocytes are activated by chemotactic agents or other stimuli (often produced by the endothelium or other cells at the site of injury). VLA-4's primary ligands include VCAM-1 and fibronectin. One activating chemokine is SDF-1. Following SDF-1 binding, the integrin undergoes a conformational change of the alpha and beta domains that is necessary to confer high binding affinity for the endothelial adhesion molecules. This change is achieved by talin or kindlin interacting with the parts of VLA-4 on the inside of the cell's surface.

In addition to its role in leukocyte adhesion, VLA-4 has also been implicated in tumor cell biology. In B16 melanoma cells, VLA-4–mediated homotypic aggregation has been reported to promote homotypic cell–cell interactions and to inhibit early steps of metastasis, such as intravasation. VLA-4–mediated interactions under shear flow have also been reported to support rolling and rapid arrest of melanoma cells on VCAM-1.

The expression of VLA-4 in the plasma membrane is regulated by different growth factors or chemokines depending on the cell type. In T cells, IL-4 down-regulates the expression of VLA-4. In CD34 positive cells, IL-3 and SCF cause up-regulation, and G-CSF causes down-regulation (stem cells are CD34 positive cells).

== Role in hematopoiesis ==
VLA-4 can be found on hematopoietic stem and progenitor cells. These cells are found in the bone marrow, as that is where they are produced, and throughout the rest of the body. VLA-4, specifically the alpha subunit, is crucial for the localization and circulation of progenitor cells. In mice, it has been shown that injected anti-alpha antibodies result in an increase in progenitor cell circulation and duration. In order for stem cells to move into the peripheral blood stream, VLA-4 must be down-regulated on the cell surface of PBSCs.

== Clinical significance ==
=== Stem and progenitor cells ===
There is possibility for stem cell therapy through stimulation the conformational change. This is currently being studied in the field. When the alpha unit was knocked out in mice, it resulted in an embryonic lethal mutation.

=== Multiple sclerosis ===
In multiple sclerosis (MS), the VLA-4 integrin is essential in the processes by which T-cells gain access to the brain. It allows the cells to penetrate the blood brain barrier that normally restricts immune cell access. It has been found that the severity of MS is positively correlated with the expression of alpha 4. One approach to prevent an autoimmune reaction has been to block the action of VLA-4 (as with natalizumab) so that pathogenic T-cells are unable to enter the brain and thus unable to attack myelin protein. It has been found that in mice, anti-alpha 4 integrin antibodies resulted in an increase of circulating stem cell and progenitor cells. Though this failed in initial multiple sclerosis research, it is still being investigated. Natalizumab, brand name Tysabri, is an approved therapy for the treatment of MS that blocks VLA-4 action.

=== Treating other inflammatory issues ===
VLA-4 antagonists have also shown potential for the treatment of several inflammatory disorders. In addition to MS, a humanized antibody, natalizumab, has been considered for treating asthma. There was some success in the initial human trials in treating Crohn's disease-- over 40% remission was witnessed. However, the usage of natalizumab, an antagonist of VLA-4 integrin, remains controversial due to several side effects including progressive multifocal leukoencephalopathy. Other allosteric antagonists have been identified that decrease VLA-4 ligand binding affinity.

=== Chemotherapy sensitivity ===
Additionally, it has been shown that VLA-4-ligand interactions can affect the sensitivity to chemotherapy in patients with malignancies in blood-forming tissue.
