= Catherine D. DeAngelis =

Catherine D. DeAngelis is the first woman and the first pediatrician to become editor of the Journal of the American Medical Association (JAMA). She has also edited several additional medical journals. Before assuming the editor's position at JAMA in 2000, DeAngelis was a professor and Vice Dean of Faculty at the Johns Hopkins School of Medicine. She is the 2015 recipient of the John Howland Award, the most prestigious award given by the American Pediatric Society (APS).

== Background and training ==
DeAngelis was born and raised in Old Forge, Lackawanna County, Pennsylvania. She completed a three-year registered nurse program at the Scranton State General Hospital School of Nursing in 1960 and worked at the Columbia University Medical Center, then known as the Columbia-Presbyterian Medical Center. DeAngelis wished to become a medical doctor, and her high school chemistry teacher both advised her to apply to college and supported her application. While attending Wilkes University, DeAngelis continued to work as a nurse, started a clinic, and pursued medical research in immunology. She then moved to the University of Pittsburgh, continuing her research and teaching and working in the library to put herself through medical school. She obtained her MD in 1969.

DeAngelis completed her residency in pediatrics at the Johns Hopkins Hospital. She then obtained a masters of public health degree at Harvard University while working in a local health clinic. During this time, DeAngelis observed problems related to health care access and cost and began to formulate possible solutions.

== Career ==
DeAngelis was able to implement some of her ideas for improving health care when she took her first faculty position at the Columbia College of Physicians. Her next appointment was at the University of Wisconsin. In 1978, DeAngelis returned to Johns Hopkins as the head of the general pediatrics and adolescent medicine division. In 1984, she was promoted to full professor, the twelfth woman to attain this distinction in the school's history. DeAngelis was the deputy head of the Johns Hopkins Children's Center. She has served as an expert witness in court cases involving pediatric medical issues, including the high-profile Elizabeth Morgan case.

DeAngelis became the vice dean for academic affairs and faculty at the Johns Hopkins School of Medicine in 1990. Under her guidance and interest in issues involving women in academia, further opportunities for women were nurtured and many women became full professors. She received a grant and directed the program to introduce a new curriculum for the medical school, emphasizing "hands-on experience and contact with patients," beginning in 1992. In 1999, DeAngelis was appointed editor of the Journal of the American Medical Association, and Janice E. Clements succeeded DeAngelis as vice dean.

DeAnglis stepped down as Editor-in-Chief of JAMA in July 2011. She returned to Johns Hopkins University where she serves in a number of capacities, including special advisor to the Dean and served as president of the Alpha of Maryland chapter of Phi Beta Kappa.

== Author and editor ==
DeAngelis published the textbook "Pediatric Primary Care" in the 1970s, with a third edition in 1984. DeAngelis and this text have been quoted often in popular articles on children's medical issues. With Frank A. Oski, director of the Johns Hopkins Children's Center, DeAngelis wrote a medical advice column in The Baltimore Sun. She has also written numerous articles in the popular press.

With Michael M.E. Johns, she co-authored "Curriculum for the Twenty-first Century" (2000).

== Publications ==
DeAngelis has authored or edited 13 books on Pediatrics, Medical Education and Patient Care, Professionalism and her recently published memoir, Pursuing Equity in Medicine: One Woman's Journey. She has also published over 250 peer reviewed articles, chapters, and editorials. Most of her recent publications have focused on professionalism and integrity in medicine, on conflict of interest in medicine, on women in medicine, and on medical education. Her major efforts have centered on human rights especially as they relate to patients, health professionals and the poor.

== Awards and honors ==
DeAngelis is a former council member and current member of the National Academy of Medicine (formerly IOM); a Fellow of the American Association for the Advancement of Science; a Fellow of the Royal College of Physicians (UK) and has served as an officer of numerous national academic societies including past chairman of the American Board of Pediatrics and chair of the Pediatric Accreditation Council for Residency Review Committee of the American Council on Graduate Medical Education. She currently serves on the advisory board of the U.S. Government Accountability Office, and serves on the board of trustees of the University of Pittsburgh and The University of California, Davis.

DeAngelis has been awarded seven honorary doctorate degrees and has received numerous awards for humanitarianism and medical excellence, including the Ronald McDonald Award for Medical Excellence ($100,000 donation made to the Johns Hopkins Child Life Program); the Armstrong, the St. Geme, and the John Howland Awards (Various Pediatric Societies); and a lifetime achievement award by the Association of American Medical Colleges (AAMC).

- 2010: Health Policy Hero Award from the National Center for Health Research
- 2008: Catcher In The Rye Humanitarian Of The Year Award, American Academy of Child and Adolescent Psychiatry (AACAP)
