= M. Christine Zink =

Canadian biologist

- Born: Toronto, Canada
- Education: University of Guelph
- Scientific career
- Fields: Pathology; Biology; Cynology
- Workplaces: Johns Hopkins Bloomberg School of Public Health

M. Christine "Chris" Zink is the director of the Department of Molecular and Comparative Pathobiology at the Johns Hopkins School of Medicine. She also holds professorships in the Department of Pathology at Johns Hopkins and in the Department of Molecular Microbiology and Immunology at the Johns Hopkins Bloomberg School of Public Health. Zink researches the response of the immune system to retroviruses such as HIV and is currently investigating an animal model of antiretroviral therapy and the potential of a common antibiotic to prevent HIV-associated neurocognitive disorders.

As a veterinarian, Zink is known for consulting and writing on canine athletics and is an expert on stem cell therapies for dogs. She was named Outstanding Woman Veterinarian of the Year at the 2009 meeting of the American Veterinary Medical Association (AVMA). Her books include Peak Performance: Coaching the Canine Athlete, Dog Health and Nutrition for Dummies, The Agility Advantage, and Jumping from A to Z: Teach Your Dog to Soar and Building the Canine Athlete: Strength, Stretching, Endurance and Body Awareness Exercises. Zink is a Toronto-born Canadian and has won several awards for her photography.

== Education and training ==
Chris Zink earned a doctor of veterinary medicine (DVM) degree from the University of Guelph, where she also received a PhD in macrophage biology. From 1985 to 1988, Zink completed a postdoctoral research fellowship with Opendra "Bill" Narayan at Johns Hopkins University, studying animal models of HIV pathogenesis.

== Academic career ==
Following her postdoctoral work, Zink accepted an assistant professorship in the comparative medicine division at Johns Hopkins. She directed the division's postdoctoral training program from 1999. In 2000, Zink became a full professor.

In 2007, Zink became the director of the Department of Molecular and Comparative Pathobiology at Johns Hopkins. She follows long-time colleague Janice E. Clements, who had raised the comparative medicine division to department status.

Zink's scientific research has focused on the effects of HIV and related lentiviruses on the central nervous system.

== Honors ==
The Association for Women Veterinarians Foundation named Zink the Outstanding Woman Veterinarian of the Year in 2009. The honor was announced at the meeting of the American Veterinary Medical Association in Seattle in 2009.
