= F. J. Dixon =

F. J. Dixon may refer to:

- Frank J. Dixon (1920–2008), an American biomedical researcher
- Fred Dixon (politician) (1881–1931), a politician in Manitoba
