= Eugene O. Major =

American virologist

Eugene O. "Gene" Major is a senior investigator at the National Institute of Neurological Disorders and Stroke (NINDS), a part of the United States National Institutes of Health (NIH). Major conducts research into the neurological diseases including progressive multifocal leukoencephalopathy (PML), caused by JC virus and often found in immunosuppressed patients such as those with HIV/AIDS. Major has published over 140 scientific articles and reviews in the peer-reviewed literature and has contributed to Fields Virology, a standard virology textbook.

== Training and career ==
As an undergraduate, Major attended the College of the Holy Cross in Worcester, Massachusetts He earned MS and PhD degrees at the University of Illinois College of Medicine, where he researched papovaviruses such as BK virus with Giampiero Di Mayorca. (The papovaviruses have since been split into two categories: papillomaviruses and polyomaviruses.)

In his first faculty position, Major was an associate professor at the University of Illinois Medical School. He later moved to the Loyola University Medical School in Chicago, where he also served as Associate Dean of Graduate Programs.

In 1981, Major became an investigator with the Neurology Institute of the National Institutes of Health. He currently leads a molecular medicine and neuroscience laboratory as a senior investigator in the Division of Intramural Research at the National Institute of Neurological Disorders and Stroke (NINDS) of the NIH.

== Research ==
Throughout his career, Major has conducted research on viruses including BK virus, adenoviruses, JC virus, simian virus 40 (SV40), HIV-1, HIV-2, HHV-6, and HPV-16.

== Coverage ==
Major has been quoted extensively in news coverage of the finding that natalizumab (Tysabri) and related monoclonal antibody-based therapies increase the risk of a rare brain disease caused by JC virus. A 2001 Medscape column named Major as a leading expert in white matter brain disease.
