= Avindra Nath =

Canadian physician-scientist

Avindra "Avi" Nath (born December 1, 1958), is a physician-scientist who specializes in neuroimmunology. Nath is a senior investigator, and intramural clinical director of the National Institute of Neurological Disorders and Stroke (NINDS) at the National Institutes of Health (NIH) in the United States. At NINDS, Nath also leads the Section of Infections of the Nervous System and plans to institute a translational research center. He previously served in several research and administrative positions at the Johns Hopkins Hospital and the Johns Hopkins University School of Medicine.

As a researcher, Nath investigates the molecular mechanisms whereby human immunodeficiency virus (HIV) causes neurological disorders including HIV dementia. Nath has published over 400 scientific articles, reviews, and book chapters, and is on the editorial board of several journals. He has been an expert advisor to the National Institutes of Health (NIH) and the Food and Drug Administration (FDA).

== Training and career ==
Born in Saskatoon, Saskatchewan; Nath attended Christian Medical College, Ludhiana in Punjab, India. After receiving his medical degree, Nath performed graduate work in neuroscience at the University of Texas Medical Branch (UTMB) in Galveston, Texas.

Nath performed a residency in neurology at the University of Texas Health Science Center in Houston, Texas. He subsequently completed a neuroimmunology research fellowship with J.S. Wolinsky, also in Houston. From 1988 through mid-1990, Nath was a visiting associate at the National Institute of Neurological Disorders and Stroke (NINDS) of the NIH. There, he conducted research with Eugene O. Major and M.E. Dubois-Dalcq.

Nath began his first faculty position in June, 1990, at the University of Manitoba in Canada, where he was promoted from assistant to associate professor and led the research group on neurovirology and neurodegenerative diseases. Nath moved to the University of Kentucky in September, 1997, as a member of the Department of Neurology and the Department of Microbiology and Immunology. While at the University of Kentucky, Nath achieved tenure. In 2002, Nath assumed a professorship at the Johns Hopkins University School of Medicine. There, he held appointments in the Department of Neurology and the Solomon H. Snyder Department of Neuroscience; he also became director of the Division of Neuroimmunology and Neurological Infections. Nath and his laboratory moved to the National Institutes of Health in 2011.

Nath has served as a staff neurologist in Manitoba; Lexington, Kentucky; and at the Johns Hopkins Hospital.

== Research ==
Nath researches the effects of HIV and other infectious agents on the central nervous system.

== Notable Contributions ==
=== Amyotrophic Lateral Sclerosis ===
Amyotrophic lateral sclerosis (ALS) is characterized by the selective loss of motor neurons. In a 2015 paper in Science Translational Medicine, Nath and colleagues proposed the controversial hypothesis that endogenous retroviruses may play a causal role in a subset of ALS cases.

=== Nodding Syndrome ===
Nodding syndrome is a form of epilepsy endemic in sub-Saharan Africa. The cause of the disease remains unknown, however epidemiologic studies identified an association between nodding syndrome and river blindness, a disease caused by the parasitic worm Onchocerca volvulus. In a 2017 publication in the journal Science Translational Medicine, Dr. Nath and colleagues implicated an autoimmune reaction to O. volvulus as a potential cause of the disease.

== Honors ==
In 2012, Nath was presented with the Pioneer in NeuroVirology Award by the International Society for NeuroVirology (ISNV) at the 11th International Symposium on NeuroVirology held in New York, New York, USA. He was elected a Fellow of the American Association for the Advancement of Science. In 2023, he was invited to deliver the fourth Sharwaree Gokhale Memorial Lecture at the Indian Institute of Science. Nath was included in the Time's 2024 list of most influential people in health and was elected a Member of the National Academy of Medicine in 2024.
