= Igor J. Koralnik =

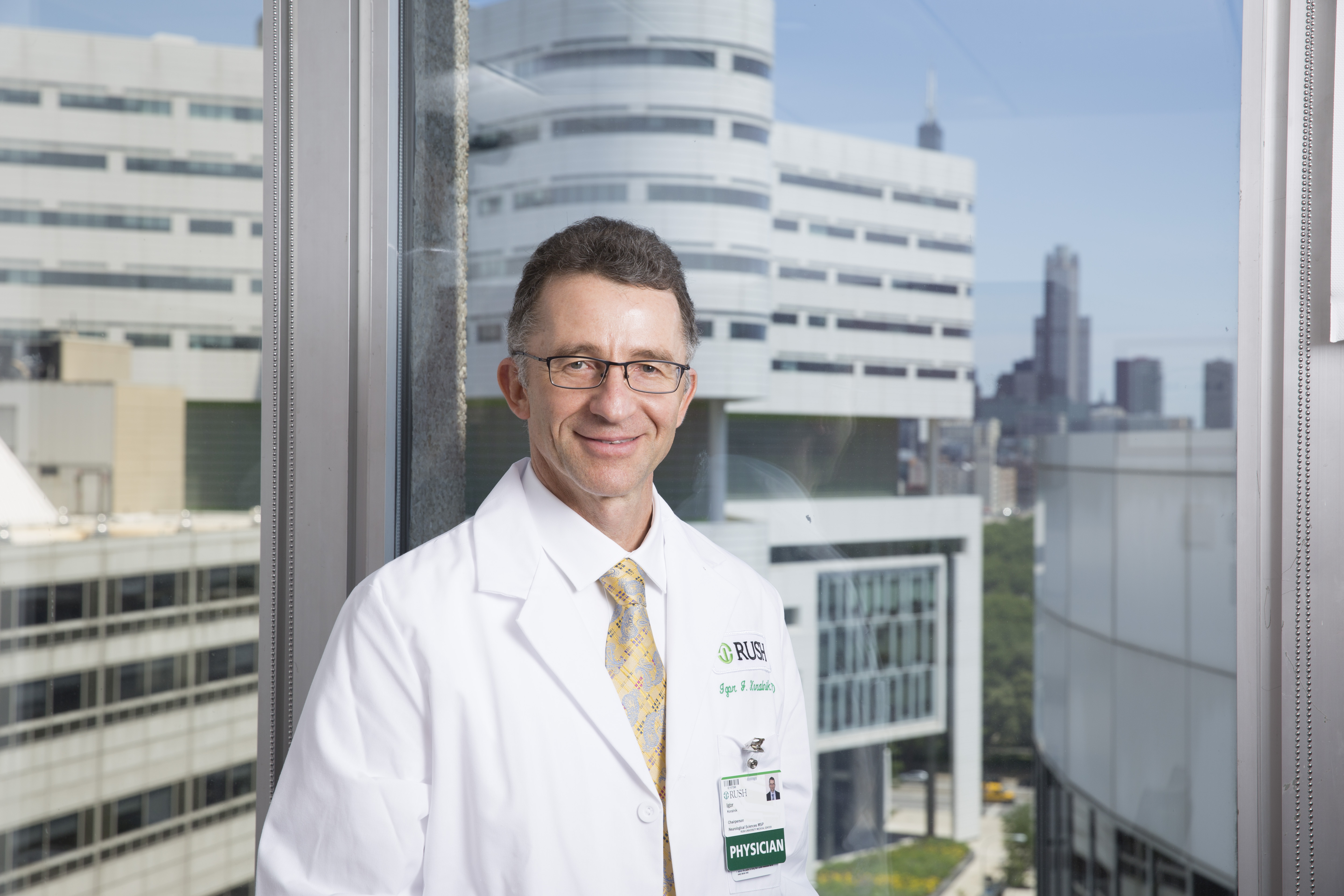
- Education: University of Geneva
- Scientific career
- Fields: Neurology
- Workplaces: Northwestern Medicine and Northwestern University, Feinberg School of Medicine

Igor Koralnik is an American physician, neurologist and scientist. He is one of the first physicians to study the neurologic complications caused by the human immunodeficiency virus (HIV) and is a leading researcher in the investigation of the polyomavirus JC (JC virus), which causes progressive multifocal leukoencephalopathy (PML), a disease of the central nervous system that occurs in immunosuppressed individuals.

== Education and training ==
Koralnik was born in Geneva, Switzerland on July 20, 1962. He moved to the United States in 1990 and became a naturalized U.S. citizen. He received his medical degree at the University of Geneva Medical School, Switzerland, in 1987. While a medical student, he became interested in a new disease – acquired immune deficiency syndrome (AIDS).

Koralnik's doctoral dissertation focused on the early neurological complications of AIDS. He used magnetic resonance imaging, electroencephalography and other electrophysiologic diagnostic technology to track damage to the brain and nerve cells. He continued these studies during his internship and residency in Internal medicine at Geneva University Hospital, under the mentorship of Dr. Bernard Hirschel. This work formed the basis of a 1990 article, which Koralnik lead-authored, in the New England Journal of Medicine, and it won him a 1991 award from the Swiss Society of Internal Medicine.

In 1990, Koralnik moved to the United States for a postdoctoral fellowship on molecular biology of retroviruses at the laboratory of Robert C. Gallo, MD, a leading AIDS researcher, at the National Cancer Institute in Bethesda, Maryland. During three years at the Gallo laboratory, Koralnik performed molecular studies on the Human T-cell lymphotropic virus type I (HTLV-I). Upon completion of the fellowship in 1993, he moved to Boston to enter the Harvard-Longwood residency program in neurology at Brigham and Women’s Hospital and Beth Israel Deaconess Medical Center (BIDMC).

During his neurology residency, Koralnik began studying the polyomavirus JC, the agent of progressive multifocal leukoencephalopathy (PML), under the mentorship of Norman Letvin, MD, professor of medicine at Harvard Medical School and chief of the Division of Viral Pathogenesis at BIDMC. After graduating from the neurology residency in 1996, Koralnik had to retake an internship year in internal medicine, which he had already completed in Switzerland, to be eligible for board certification in neurology in the United States. He received his certificate in neurology from the American Board of Psychiatry and Neurology in 1998.

== Clinical career ==
In 1997, Koralnik became assistant professor of neurology at Harvard Medical School. He founded and directed the HIV/Neurology Center at BIDMC, which is an outpatient treatment center for patients with neurologic problems due to HIV infection. He also opened a research laboratory at BIDMC studying the pathogenesis of JC virus in PML.

During 19 years in Boston, he was the director of the neuro-HIV fellowship program at BIDMC. He rose through the ranks and became a full professor of Neurology at Harvard Medical School in 2009 and chief of the Division of Neuro-Immunology at BIDMC in 2012. Koralnik became deeply engaged in mentoring young physicians and scientists at BIDMC and other Harvard-affiliated hospitals. Together with a BIDMC mentee, Dr. Omar Siddiqi, Koralnik founded in 2010 the Global Neurology research program at the University Teaching Hospital in Lusaka, Zambia.

In July 2016, he moved to Chicago to become chairperson of the Department of Neurological Sciences and the Jean Schweppe Armour professor of neurology and medicine at Rush University Medical Center (RUMC) and created the Section of Neuro-infectious Diseases at RUMC.

Koralnik developed a neuro-immunology fellowship at BIDMC and then one at RUMC. Fellows rotate in the multiple sclerosis (MS) clinic, the neuro-HIV clinic and the neuro-infectious disease clinic at RUMC and learn to care for patients over the entire immunologic spectrum.

In December 2019, Koralnik joined the Northwestern Medicine Staff in Chicago, IL, where he currently serves as the Chief of Neuroinfectious Diseases and Global Neurology. He also works as the Archibald Church Professor of Neurology at the Feinberg School of Medicine at Northwestern University.

Koralnik has been conducting research and offering insight regarding the neurological manifestation of COVID-19. In June 2020, he published a study in the Annals of Neurology where he reviewed the neurological complications of COVID-19.

Koralnik started the Neuro COVID-19 Clinic at Northwestern Memorial Hospital in May 2020, where he and his team investigate, diagnose and manage neurological symptoms of patients affected by the illness, as well as individuals with symptoms consistent with COVID-19, but who test negative for the virus SARS-CoV-2.

In October 2020, Koralnik published a study in the Annals of Clinical and Translational Neurology, where he and his team examined neurologic manifestations in 509 consecutive patients admitted with confirmed COVID-19 within the Northwestern Medicine health system in the Chicago area. The study found that nearly a third of hospitalized COVID-19 patients experienced encephalopathy; these patients had significantly worse medical outcomes and stayed three times as long in the hospital as patients without encephalopathy.

In March 2021, Koralnik and the Neuro COVID-19 Clinic at Northwestern Memorial Hospital published a study in the Annals of Clinical and Translational Neurology. The study focused on long-term neurological symptoms of people who were never physically sick enough from COVID-19 to require hospitalization. After studying 100 patients from 21 states, the study found that 85 percent of them experienced four or more neurological issues like brain fog, headaches, tingling, muscle pain, dizziness and continued loss of the sense of taste and touch.

== Memberships and editorial activities ==
Koralnik joined the American Neurological Association in 2004 and was elected member of the prestigious American Society for Clinical Investigation in 2008. He is a founding member of the Neuro-infectious Disease Section and Global Health Section of the American Academy of Neurology. He has been a member of the International Society for NeuroVirology since its inception in 1998 and became its president in 2016.

Koralnik is also a member of the American Neurological Association, the American Association of Immunologists, and of the American Society for Microbiology. He has been on the editorial board of the Journal of NeuroVirology since 2008 and he was associate editor of the Annals of Neurology from 2013-2016.

== Major accomplishments ==
Koralnik started his career studying early neurological aspects of HIV/AIDS. Neurological complications occur in 30% to 50% of HIV-infected persons, and they can present as the initial symptom, throughout the course of the disease or in the advanced stage.

He then focused his research on JC virus (JCV) and PML. Koralnik and colleagues have characterized the cellular immune response against JCV, and showed that it was a key aspect to survival in PML patients. He is now studying the development of epilepsy, which occurs in 44% of patients with PML.

Koralnik is credited for demonstrating that JCV can infect not only glial cells (oligodendrocytes and astrocytes) but also neurons. He and his colleagues have identified two novel clinical entities distinct from PML – JCV-granule cell neuronopathy and JCV-encephalopathy – that are caused by JCV deletion variants. He and his colleagues also demonstrated that JCV can infect meningeal and choroid plexus cells and cause JCV meningitis. They are studying the development of epilepsy in PML patients as well. Koralnik has also been studying the determinants of latency and reactivation of JCV in patients with MS who have been treated with natalizumab (Tysabri) or dimethylfumarate (Tecfidera). Natalizumab, an immuno-modulatory medication, was associated with 563 cases of PML in MS patients worldwide as of June 2015.

Koralnik has written book chapters on JCV and PML and on the neurologic complications of HIV infection. He has been an invited speaker on those topics across the US, as well as in England, Israel, Italy, France, Switzerland, Zambia and Malaysia. He has also delivered lectures and continuing medical education courses at medical society meetings and medical conferences.

In addition, Koralnik has been active in expanding global health, which involves striving to achieve equity in the health of all people in the world. At the Global Neurology research program in Lusaka, Zambia, he and his colleagues have studied central nervous system opportunistic infections and new onset seizures in HIV-infected patients. There are currently only four neurologists in all of Zambia, which has a population of 14.3 million. Starting in 2021, selected neurology residents from Northwestern Medicine will spend a month-long elective in Zambia.

== Personal life ==
Koralnik is married and has three children.
