= Diane Griffin (biologist) =

American biologist (1940–2024)

Diane Edmund Griffin (May 5, 1940 – October 28, 2024) was an American biologist who was the university distinguished professor and a professor in the Department of Molecular Microbiology and Immunology at the Johns Hopkins Bloomberg School of Public Health, where she was the department chair from 1994 to 2015. Until her death, Griffin served as the vice-president of the National Academy of Sciences. She held joint appointments in the departments of Neurology and Medicine. In 2004, Griffin was elected to the United States National Academy of Sciences (NAS) in the discipline of microbial biology.

== Background ==
Griffin was born on May 5, 1940. After earning her undergraduate degree from Augustana College in Rock Island, Illinois, she joined a joint MD/PhD graduate program at Stanford University, where she pursued research on immunoglobulins. Griffin received her PhD and MD in 1968 and remained at Stanford Hospital for her internship and residency.

Griffin performed postdoctoral research in virology at the Johns Hopkins University School of Medicine. Along with Janice E. Clements and others, Griffin is a notable trainee of neurovirology specialist Richard T. Johnson.

Griffin died on October 28, 2024, at the age of 84.

== Career ==
Griffin became a faculty member at Johns Hopkins in 1973 in the Department of Neurology. She attained the rank of full professor in 1986. In 1994, Griffin became the chair of the Department of Molecular Microbiology and Immunology at the Johns Hopkins School of Hygiene and Public Health, now known as the Bloomberg School of Public Health. She held the chair position from 1994 to 2014, as well as numerous other roles science leadership in academic and government organizations, including Vice President of the National Academy of Sciences from 2013 to 2024.

== Research ==
Virology was Griffin's specialty from the time of her postdoctoral work. Her research examined how the body responds to viral infection. Griffin placed particular emphasis on the central nervous system, researching the effects of Sindbis virus and the measles virus on the brain. Further, her work contributed to knowledge of how long-term immunity to re-infection with measles develops.

== Honors and awards ==
Griffin has received numerous awards and honorific memberships.

- Membership in the National Academy of Sciences (2004)
- Membership of the American Academy of Microbiology
- Membership in the National Academy of Medicine
- Membership in the American Philosophical Society
- Inducted into the Maryland Women's Hall of Fame
- Awarded the Rudolf Virchow Medal, University of Würzburg
- Awarded the Wallace Sterling Lifetime Alumni Achievement Award, Stanford University
- Awarded the Pioneer in NeuroVirology Award by the International Society for NeuroVirology at the 9th International Symposium on NeuroVirology held in Miami, Florida, in 2009.
