= Patrick Sissons =

English physician

Sir Patrick Sissons
- Born: 28 June 1945; Hessle, East Riding of Yorkshire, England
- Died: 25 September 2016 (aged 71)
- Scientific career
- Institutions: Royal Postgraduate Medical School; John E. Fogarty International Center; University of Cambridge
- Thesis: The metabolism of the fifth component of complement, and its relation to metabolism of the third component, in patients with complement activation, and Studies on the characterisation of nephritic factor (1978)
- Doctoral students: Leszek Borysiewicz

Sir John Gerald Patrick Sissons (28 June 1945 – 25 September 2016) was an English physician, specialising in nephrology and virology, focusing on cytomegalovirus. He was a FRCP, FRCPath, FMedSci and Regius Professor of Physic at the University of Cambridge.

== Biography ==
Patrick Sissons was born in Hessle, East Riding of Yorkshire and attended Ilkley and Felsted School. He studied medicine at St Mary's Hospital Medical School, London. After graduation, he continued there, specialising in nephrology, studying immune-mediated kidney diseases. His clinical training was at the University of the West Indies.

== Career ==
Sissons won an NIH Fogarty Fellowship and moved to the Scripps Research Institute in San Diego for 3 years, where he worked under Michael Oldstone.

He returned to London and continued at Hammersmith Hospital, working with Keith Peters (physician) on the virology research side and Jonathan Cohen, establishing a clinical infectious diseases service. He began working on cytomegalovirus during the late 1970s and 1980s with John Sinclair focusing on virus latency and reactivation in humans, which had been done in animal models only. Leszek Borysiewicz was his PhD student.

In 1987, he moved to the University of Cambridge, helped develop the Faculty of Clinical Medicine, connecting it with the MRC Laboratory of Molecular Biology and Addenbrooke's Hospital, helped to develop the Centre for Clinical Investigation, the Institute of Metabolic Science and the Cambridge Biomedical Research Centre and is said to have convinced AstraZeneca to move its research to Cambridge.

In 2005, Sissons became Regius Professor of Physic at the University of Cambridge after Peters retired, until his own retirement in 2012. He died in September 2016 from complications of Parkinson's disease.
