= International Society for NeuroVirology =

The International Society for NeuroVirology (ISNV) was founded to promote research into disease-causing viruses that infect the human brain and nervous system. The ISNV membership includes scientists and clinicians from around the world who work in the fields of basic, translational, and clinical neurovirology.

== History ==
The ISNV was conceived during the 1st International Symposium on NeuroVirology, which was held in Philadelphia, Pennsylvania, US, in 1997. The ISNV was officially established in 1998 as a non-profit organization by Kamel Khalili, Ph.D, with Brian Wigdahl, Ph.D., and Steven Jacobson, Ph.D., as its founding president and vice-president, respectively. The leadership of the Society has included:

Term of office	President	Vice-President
1998-2003	Brian Wigdahl, Ph.D.	Steven Jacobson, Ph.D.
2004-2009	Peter G.E. Kennedy, CBE, M.D., Ph.D., D.Sc.	Robert Fujinami, Ph.D.
2010-2012	Lynn Pulliam, Ph.D.	Avindra Nath, M.D.
2013–2015	Avindra Nath, M.D.	Igor Koralnik, M.D.
2016–present	Igor Koralnik, M.D.	Ruth Brack-Werner, Ph.D.

== Mission ==
The ISNV provides an international forum for researchers and clinical scientists working in the field of neurovirology. By promoting collaborative interactions among scientists with common interests, the ISNV supports advances in the field of neurovirology and related disciplines. The goal of the ISNV is to promote basic science as well as the clinical application of knowledge to the prevention and treatment of neuroinflammatory and viral diseases of the nervous system. The mission of the ISNV is accomplished primarily through the organization and sponsorship of regular international meetings, and through the Society's official publication, the Journal of NeuroVirology. Activities that support the mission of the ISNV include:

- Organization and sponsorship of the International Symposium on NeuroVirology
- Co-sponsorship of small research conferences in neurovirology and related areas
- Publication of reviews and research articles in the bi-monthly Journal of NeuroVirology
- Publication and electronic distribution of the Society newsletter, which features current topics in neurovirology and highlights significant scientific achievements of neurovirologists from around the world
- Sponsorship of the Pioneer in NeuroVirology award, which recognizes researchers who make important contributions to the field of neurovirology
- Support of education in neurovirology-related areas by sponsorship of graduate and post-graduate participation in the International Symposium on NeuroVirology

== Membership ==
The ISNV currently has approximately 330 members, who collectively represent 15 countries around the world. Approximately one-quarter of its members reside outside the United States. Annual memberships are available to faculty members, research scientists, and clinicians who have interests in neurovirology. Post-doctoral fellows and students are also eligible to join (at a reduced membership rate).

== Governance ==
The ISNV is managed through its board of directors, which meets bi-annually and in conjunction with the International Symposium on NeuroVirology. The board of directors is responsible for choosing the society's executive officers, which include a president, vice-president, secretary, and treasurer. The president serves as the chief executive officer of the organization.

The current president of the ISNV is Avindra Nath, who took office in 2013. Nath holds the position of intramural clinical director of the National Institute of Neurological Disorders and Stroke (NINDS) at the National Institutes of Health (NIH).

The following committees, which are composed of ISNV members from around the world, carry out specific functions of the ISNV:

- Fundraising
- Publications and Communications
- Women in NeuroVirology
- Investigators in Training
- Meetings
- International Interests
- Junior Scientists

== Symposia ==
The ISNV regularly sponsors an International Symposium on NeuroVirology and concurrent Conference on HIV in the Nervous System. These meetings involve more than 350 basic and clinical scientists and trainees working in the areas of neurology, neuropathology, neuropathogenesis, neurobiology, neuroimmunology, neurochemistry, and molecular virology. Symposia have been held at locations around the world since 1997:

Year	Meeting dates	Meeting title	Location
1997	May 5–7	1st International Symposium on NeuroVirology	Philadelphia, Pennsylvania, US
1999	June 6–11	2nd International Symposium on NeuroVirology (held as a Gordon Research Conference on Neurovirology)	Colby-Sawyer College, New London, New Hampshire, US
2000	September 14–16	3rd International Symposium on NeuroVirology	San Francisco, California, US
2002	June 19–22	4th International Symposium on NeuroVirology (held jointly with the 10th Conference on Neuroscience of HIV Infection)	Düsseldorf, Germany
2003	September 2–6	5th International Symposium on NeuroVirology and the HIV Molecular & Clinical NeuroScience Workshop	Baltimore, Maryland, US
2004	September 11–14	6th International Symposium on NeuroVirology and the HIV Neuroprotection Workshop	Alghero, Sardinia, Italy
2006	May 30-June 3	7th International Symposium on NeuroVirology	Philadelphia, Pennsylvania, US
2007	October 29-November 2	8th International Symposium on NeuroVirology	San Diego, California, US
2009	June 2–6	9th International Symposium on NeuroVirology	Miami, Florida, US
2010	October 12–16	10th International Symposium on NeuroVirology (held jointly with the 2010 Conference on HIV in the Nervous System)	Milan, Italy
2012	May 29-June 2	11th International Symposium on NeuroVirology (held jointly with the 2012 Conference on HIV in the Nervous System)	New York City, US
2013	October 29-November 2	12th International Symposium on NeuroVirology (held jointly with the 2013 Conference on HIV in the Nervous System)	Washington, D.C.
2015	June 2–6	13th International Symposium on NeuroVirology (held jointly with the 2015 Conference on HIV in the Nervous System)	San Diego, California, US
2016	October 25–28	14th International Symposium on NeuroVirology (held jointly with the 2016 Conference on HIV in the Nervous System)	Toronto, Ontario, Canada

The overall goal of these meetings is to provide investigators working in the field of neurovirology and related areas with leading edge information so that important gaps in knowledge can continue to be identified. Armed with this information, attendees of both events work toward formulating questions and experimental directions that will enhance the development of new preventative and therapeutic strategies effective against neurologic diseases associated with prions, HIV, and other viral and non-viral pathogens.

== Publications ==
The ISNV periodically publishes a newsletter, which is distributed electronically to all members. The goal of the newsletter is to provide a forum through which information about current Society issues as well as "hot" news in the field of neurovirology can be disseminated.

The official journal of the ISNV is the Journal of NeuroVirology. The Journal of NeuroVirology (JNV) provides a unique platform for the publication of high-quality basic science and clinical studies on the molecular biology and pathogenesis of viral infections of the nervous system, and for reporting on the development of novel therapeutic strategies using neurotropic viral vectors. The journal also emphasizes publication of papers on non-viral infections that affect the central nervous system. The journal publishes original research articles, reviews, case reports, and coverage of various scientific meetings, as well as supplements and special issues on selected subjects. The journal has been published by Springer since 2011.

== Pioneer in NeuroVirology ==
The Pioneer in NeuroVirology award is presented by the ISNV in recognition of outstanding individual achievement in the field of neurovirology. Each International Symposium on NeuroVirology honors a worthy recipient of this award. Pioneers in NeuroVirology have been recognized by the ISNV since 1999. Recipients of the Pioneer in NeuroVirology Award include:

- Richard T. Johnson, M.D. (1999)
- Volker ter Meulen, M.D., Ph.D. (2000)
- Neal Nathanson, M.D. (2002)
- Michael B. A. Oldstone, M.D. (2003)
- Hilary Koprowski, M.D. (2004)
- Opendra Narayan, D.V.M., Ph.D. (2006)
- Donald H. Gilden, M.D. (2007)
- Diane Griffin, M.D., Ph.D. (2009)
- Kamel Khalili, Ph.D. (2010)
- Avindra Nath, M.D. (2012)
- Brian Wigdahl, Ph.D. (2013)
- Joseph Berger, M.D. (2015)
