= Richard T. Johnson =

American neurologist

- Born: 1931; Colorado
- Died: November 22, 2015 (aged 83–84); Johns Hopkins Hospital
- Occupations: Physician and Scientist
- Known for: Contributions to understanding of infections of the Central nervous system and Transmissible spongiform encephalopathy

Richard T. Johnson (July 16,1931 - November 22, 2015) was a physician and scientist at the Johns Hopkins University School of Medicine. Johnson was a faculty member in the Department of Neurology since its inception in 1969 and was the former head of the department. His research into the effects of viruses on the central nervous system has been published in over 300 scientific articles, and Johnson was both a journal and book editor and the author of an influential textbook, Viral Infections of the Nervous System.

== Education and training ==
Johnson, who was raised in Colorado, received his undergraduate degree cum laude from the University of Colorado in Boulder in 1953. He remained in Colorado to earn his medical degree in 1956 at the University of Colorado School of Medicine in Aurora, Colorado. He interned in internal medicine at Stanford University.

From 1957 to 1959, Johnson conducted research at the Walter Reed Army Institute of Research, Department of Virus Diseases, in Washington, DC. Johnson completed his residency in neurology at Harvard Medical School and Massachusetts General Hospital. He conducted research at the Institute of Advanced Studies at the Australian National University from 1962 to 1964.

== Career ==
Johnson's first faculty appointment was as an assistant, then associate, professor of neurology at Case Western Reserve University.

In 1969, Johnson moved to the Johns Hopkins School of Medicine, accepting the Dwight D. Eisenhower Professorship of Neurology and founding a new Department of Neurology with Guy McKhann. Johnson was director of the department from 1988 until 1997 and remains a faculty member. He is also a professor of microbiology in the Department of Molecular Biology and Genetics and holds a joint appointment in the Department of Immunology and Infectious Diseases at the Johns Hopkins Bloomberg School of Public Health. Johnson has been a visiting professor at universities in Peru, Thailand, Iran, and Germany.

Johnson was on the staff of the Johns Hopkins Hospital and until 1997 was Neurologist-in Chief at the Johns Hopkins Hospital. He was certified by the American Board of Psychiatry and Neurology in 1966.

In 1997, Johnson became the founding director of the National Neuroscience Institute of Singapore, which he directed until 2000. He also assumed editorship of the Annals of Neurology.

Johnson's monograph Viral Infections of the Nervous System was published in 1982. A second edition followed in 1998.

During his career, Johnson had supervised the post-doctoral training of many notable scientists, including Janice E. Clements, Diane Griffin, and Opendra "Bill" Narayan.

== Death ==
Johnson died of pneumonia on November 22, 2015, at Johns Hopkins Hospital.

== Research ==
Throughout his career, Johnson had contributed to understanding of infections of the central nervous system.

=== Transmissible spongiform encephalopathies ===
Johnson met D. Carleton Gajdusek, 1976 Nobel Prize winner for his work on transmissible spongiform encephalopathies (TSEs, or prion diseases), while working at Walter Reed in the 1950s. In 1964, Johnson himself observed a case of Kuru, a prion disease, in Papua New Guinea. When Johnson became a professor at Johns Hopkins, his lab held joint lab meetings with Gajdusek's lab. Johnson helped to examine the first chimpanzee to show signs of Kuru after Gajdusek experimentally inoculated it with brain matter from a human victim. Johnson later chaired a US Institute of Medicine committee on TSEs. The committee released a report in 2004, stressing the need for further and expanded research into prion diseases

== Honors and awards ==
Johnson's honors and awards include:

- The Ford Award for clinical teaching at Johns Hopkins School of Medicine (twice)
- The Humboldt Prize (Germany)
- The Gordon Wilson Medal from the American Clinical and Climatological Association
- The Jean Martin Charcot Award from the International Federation of Multiple Sclerosis Societies
- The Smadel Medal from the Infectious Disease Society of America
- The first Multiple Sclerosis Society Medal from the Association of British Neurologists
- The Florence Rena Sabin Award from the University of Colorado Health Sciences Center
- The first Victor and Clara Soriano Award from the World Federation of Neurology
- The Order of Hipolito Unanue conferred by the President and the Minister of Health of Peru
- The first Pioneer of Neurovirology Award from the International Society for NeuroVirology (awarded at the 2nd International Symposium on NeuroVirology on June 6, 1999, in New London, New Hampshire, USA)
- Elected to the Institute of Medicine (1987)
- Distinguished Service Professor of the Johns Hopkins University School of Medicine (2001)
- Honorary Fellow of the Royal College of Physicians in London (2003)
- The state-of-the-art lecture at the Liverpool Neurological Infectious Diseases Course established in 2007 is named after him
