= Michael Oldstone =

Michael B. A. Oldstone

Michael Beaureguard Alan Oldstone (February 9, 1932 – July 13, 2023) was an American virologist and immunologist known for his work on viral pathogenesis, a field of which he is considered one of the founders. He and his group originated several important concepts, including molecular mimicry, disease associated with immune complexes, and the idea that persistent viruses can alter cellular functioning in significant ways. His research focused on RNA viruses that infect animals, particularly lymphocytic choriomeningitis virus but also influenza virus, measles virus and others, often using mouse models of infection. Oldstone spent his entire research career at the Scripps Research Institute (1966–2019). In addition to his academic writing, he published the general-audience book, Viruses, Plagues, and History (1998).

== Early life and education ==
Oldstone was born in 1932 in Manhattan, New York City, to Jewish parents. His father was a businessman in the retail industry and his mother modeled for Vogue. He studied English and history at the University of Alabama (1950–54). After graduating, he spent 2.5 years in the 82nd Airborne Division of the US Army, posted to Germany, with the rank of lieutenant.

He then trained in medicine at the University of Maryland School of Medicine, where he was mentored by the infectious disease specialist, Theodore Woodward. Simultaneously, he undertook postgraduate-level study in biochemistry with William D. McElroy's group at Johns Hopkins University, and in microbiology with Charles Weissmann, Sheldon Greisman and in Jacob Fine's group. After gaining his MD in 1961, Oldstone completed residencies in medicine and neurology at University Hospital in Baltimore.

== Career ==
In 1966, Oldstone went to what was then the Scripps Clinic and Research Foundation (later the Scripps Research Institute), La Jolla, California, where he initially worked under its head, Frank J. Dixon, and was also influenced by the virologist Karl Habel. Oldstone was swiftly given tenure at Scripps, where he founded his own laboratory in 1969; he remained at the institute for the rest of his career, retiring in 2019. He held professorships in molecular and integrative neurosciences (1989–2008) and in immunology and microbial science (2008–17). He trained many postdoctoral fellows, including Rafi Ahmed and Patrick Sissons.

== Research ==
Oldstone is described by Peter M. Howley in an obituary as "one of the founders of the field of viral pathogenesis", together with Bernard N. Fields and Abner L. Notkins. Rafi Ahmed considers that his group originated "major new concepts in viral pathogenesis and immunity"; these include molecular mimicry, disease associated with immune complexes, and the idea that persistent viruses can alter cellular functioning in significant ways. Ahmed concludes that the discoveries had an "important and shared underlying theme... The conventional wisdom was that viruses cause disease by killing their target cells in vivo, but [Oldstone]'s pioneering studies documented that the immune response to the virus is also an important contributor to the pathogenesis of disease". Ahmed attributes Oldstone's success to studying infection in "well-defined" mouse models, and using a range of "cutting-edge" techniques.

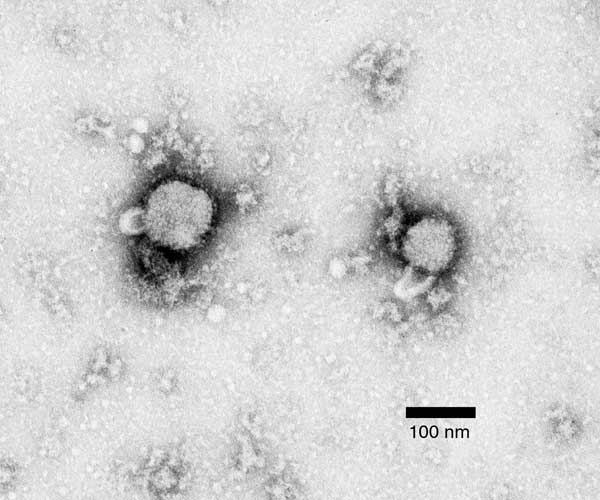
Negative-stained electron micrograph of lymphocytic choriomeningitis virus, the focus of much of Oldstone's research

=== Lymphocytic choriomeningitis virus ===
Oldstone's research predominantly focused on lymphocytic choriomeningitis virus (LCMV), an arenavirus of mice which infects mouse cells without killing them. If infected as an adult, LCMV is usually cleared rapidly by the immune system (acute infection), but in mice infected congenitally, the virus can persist in the long term without causing obvious symptoms. In a 2016 review, Oldstone refers to the model system of LCMV infection in mice as "a Rosetta Stone for solving several important puzzles in biology that relate to human diseases". When he started his research in 1966, it was thought that mice with persistent infections could not make antibodies against LCMV because they had become tolerant to the virus, and indeed, the animals' blood lacked detectable levels of anti-LCMV antibodies. However, mice with persistent LCMV infection can go on to develop a form of kidney disease that is usually caused by antibodies, and it was this puzzle that Dixon suggested Oldstone should work on. Oldstone showed that persistently infected mice did make anti-LCMV antibody, but it was not located in the blood but rather deposited in the kidneys and some other organs, where it was bound to the virus to form immune complexes. These antibody–virus complexes were responsible for the kidney disease. He later demonstrated similar findings in other mouse viruses associated with persistent infections, including the retrovirus, Gross murine leukemia virus. Immune complexes associated with pathology are also a feature of persistent viral infections with many viruses, including those that infect humans.

In the early 1980s, Oldstone, with Robert Fujinami and others in his laboratory, discovered the phenomenon they named molecular mimicry, whereby viral products that are similar to host proteins can result in an autoimmune response because antibodies to the virus cross-react with host tissues. In 1991, using a transgenic mouse model that expressed an LCMV product in pancreatic β-cells, Oldstone and coworkers showed that infection with LCMV led to diabetes, because the antiviral response also destroyed the insulin-producing β-cells.

Another strand of Oldstone's research during the 1980s focused on ways in which LCMV affects the host cells that it infects. His findings include that endocrine cells stop making growth hormone, and that GAP43 is downregulated in nerve cells; in both cases, the changes induced by the virus caused disease or impairment in the infected mouse. Later, he showed that LCMV induces the immune regulator interleukin 10, which downregulates the immune response, allowing the virus to escape clearance and favoring the establishment of persistent infections.

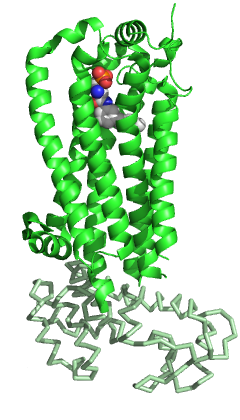
Sphingosine-1-phosphate receptor 1 (ribbon diagram)

=== Influenza ===
In the 2000s and early 2010s, Oldstone studied influenza virus – another negative-stranded RNA virus – which causes acute infections often characterized by the immune system overreacting in a potentially fatal cytokine storm. Oldstone, with his colleague Hugh Rosen, studied the cytokine storm provoked in mice and ferrets by infection with influenza virus H1N1, and showed that the immune overreaction was responsible for some of the symptoms.

They further demonstrated that an agonist of the sphingosine-1-phosphate receptor 1 could reduce inappropriate T-cell activation without preventing antibody generation, to provide a protective effect in this animal model that was superior to that of the licensed anti-influenza agent oseltamivir. Their research gave proof of concept that immune modulators could reduce influenza mortality at least as well as neuraminidase inhibitors such as oseltamivir in this model, and also suggests that drugs targeting the sphingosine-1-phosphate pathway could be effective against hantavirus and severe acute respiratory syndrome coronavirus 1, where cytokine storms are known to contribute to the pathology.

=== Measles ===
Measles virus, another negative-stranded RNA virus, was another research focus. Measles is usually an acute infection but rarely viral persistence in the nervous system can eventually lead to subacute sclerosing panencephalitis. Oldstone postulated that changes in viral products induced by the antibody response, termed "antibody-induced antigen modulation", could enable viruses such as measles to evade the immune response, thus tipping the balance towards viral persistence. He went on to demonstrate that antibodies could indeed precipitate changes in viral protein expression. His hypothesis has since been confirmed by others studying other persistent viruses.

== Writing ==
After studying history for his first degree, Oldstone retained his interest in the subject. In 1996 he co-edited, with Hilary Koprowski, Microbe Hunters: Then And Now, a collection of essays about Paul de Kruif's 1926 book Microbe Hunters, which Oldstone acknowledged as an inspiration for pursuing a career relating to infectious diseases. In 1998, Oldstone published a general-audience book, Viruses, Plagues, and History, with Oxford University Press, with the latest edition appearing in 2020. The first edition was positively reviewed by Robin A. Weiss in Science, who describes it as giving "concise, telling accounts" of major virus epidemics and the virologists associated with them, calling the book "accessible reading for the nonspecialist". A more-critical review by Sheryl Gay Stolberg in The New York Times considers the book to be "sprinkled with good anecdotes" but criticizes the prose as "dense, overly technical and sorely lacking in detail".

His academic books include Concepts in Viral Pathogenesis, co-edited with Abner L. Notkins (1984).

== Awards and honors ==
Oldstone was an elected member of the Institute of Medicine (now the National Academy of Medicine; 2003) and National Academy of Sciences (2008). His awards include the J. Allyn Taylor International Prize in Medicine, with Bernard Moss and Bernard Roizman, for their work on viral pathogenesis and interactions between the virus and its host (1997), and the Pioneer in NeuroVirology Award of the International Society for NeuroVirology, for "significant advancements that have led to the understanding of viral persistence and immunity in the nervous system" (2003).

== Personal life ==
He was married to Elizabeth (Betsy) Hoster Oldstone, a teacher; they had a daughter and two sons. Oldstone died on July 13, 2023, in La Jolla.

== Selected publications ==
Authored books

- Ebola's Curse: 2013–2016 Outbreak in West Africa (with Madeleine Rose Oldstone) (Academic Press; 2017) ISBN 9780128138885
- Viruses, Plagues, and History (Oxford University Press; 1998, 2020) ISBN 9780195134223

Edited books (selected)

- Microbe Hunters: Then And Now (with Hilary Koprowski) (Medi-Ed Press; 1996) ISBN 0936741112
- Concepts in Viral Pathogenesis (with Abner L. Notkins) (Springer-Verlag; 1984, 1986, 1989) ISBN 9780387969749

Reviews

- Oldstone, Michael B. A. (2016). "An odyssey to viral pathogenesis". Annual Review of Pathology: Mechanisms of Disease. 11: 1–19. doi:10.1146/annurev-pathol-012615-044107.
- Oldstone, Michael B. A. (2007). "A suspenseful game of 'hide and seek' between virus and host". Nature Immunology. 8 (4): 325–27. doi:10.1038/ni0407-325.

Research papers

- Fujinami, Robert S.; Oldstone, Michael B. A. (1985). "Amino acid homology between the encephalitogenic site of myelin basic protein and virus: Mechanism for autoimmunity". Science. 230 (4729): 1043–45. doi:10.1126/science.2414848.
- Oldstone, M. B.; Dixon, F. J. (1967). "Lymphocytic choriomeningitis: Production of antibody by "tolerant" infected mice". Science. 158 (3805): 1193–95. doi:10.1126/science.158.3805.1193.
