= Journal of NeuroVirology =

- Discipline: Neuroscience, Virology
- Language: English
- Edited by: K. Khalili

Publication details
- History: 1994-present
- Publisher: Springer Science+Business Media (United States)
- Frequency: Bimonthly
- Impact factor: 2.569 (2015)

Standard abbreviations
- ISO 4: J. Neurovirol.

Indexing
- ISSN: 1355-0284 (print); 1538-2443 (web)

Links
- Journal homepage

The Journal of NeuroVirology is a medical journal that publishes review articles on the molecular biology, immunology, genetics, epidemiology, and pathogenesis of CNS disorders with the goal of bridging the gap between basic and clinical studies, and enhancing translational research in neurovirology. It is published by Springer Science+Business Media. The Journal of NeuroVirology is the official journal of the International Society for Neurovirology.

== Abstracting and indexing ==
The journal is abstracted and indexed in:

- Science Citation Index Expanded
- Journal Citation Reports/Science Edition
- SCOPUS
- PsycINFO
- EMBASE
- Chemical Abstracts Service
- CSA Illumina
- Biological Abstracts
- BIOSIS
- CAB Abstracts
- Current Contents/ Life Sciences
- Global Health
- Neuroscience Citation Index
- PASCAL
- Summon by Serial Solutions
