= Frank J. Dixon =

American biomedical researcher

Frank James Dixon (March 9, 1920 – February 8, 2008) was an American biomedical researcher, known for his research into autoimmunity – diseases of the immune system that can damage other organs of the body – as well as for developing radioactive labeling techniques to study proteins. He held a chair in the pathology department of the University of Pittsburgh (1951–61). In 1961, he co-founded the Scripps Research Institute, and was its inaugural director (1961–86).

== Early life, education and military service ==
Dixon was born in St. Paul, Minnesota, in 1920. His father was a machinist; his mother, Rosa (née Kuhfeld) was the daughter of an Austrian immigrant who worked as an engineer on the railways. His father was also associated with the Farmer–Labor Party; his biographer Michael Oldstone notes that Dixon was brought up in a "progressive, liberal environment with an appreciation of the workingman".

In 1936, he went to the University of Minnesota, at first studying mathematics and then medicine; he received his bachelor's degree and M.D. in 1942. He joined the United States Navy in 1943, serving in the Pacific and in Japan in the medical corps of the United States Marines, with the rank of lieutenant, and receiving the Purple Heart.

== Career ==
After completing his military service, Dixon worked as a research assistant under Shields Warren in the pathology department of Harvard Medical School (1946–48), gaining experience with radioisotopes, and then held the position of instructor in Washington University in St. Louis's pathology department (1948–51). In 1951, he was appointed to a chair in the pathology department of the University of Pittsburgh. In 1961, with four colleagues from Pittsburgh, Dixon co-founded the Scripps Research Institute in La Jolla, San Diego, and served as its inaugural director until 1986, when he was succeeded by Richard Lerner. He retired in 1987. Postdoctoral fellows whom he trained while at Scripps include David Talmage.

== Research ==
Dixon's early research after the Second World War was into tagging proteins with radioactive isotopes, in particular those of iodine, to enable the location of the radiolabeled proteins to be determined. Similar methods remain in wide use.

He then used the radiolabeling technique to research serum sickness, which occurred when animal serum containing antibodies was used to treat people with bacterial infections. He showed in experimental animals that high levels of complexes between antibody and proteins could be demonstrated in tissues that were injured in cases of serum sickness, such as the kidneys, heart, blood vessels and joints. He also showed that these immune complexes led to inflammation, via activating the complement cascade. The results were applicable to other diseases including systemic lupus erythematosus, an autoimmune disease.

At Scripps in the 1960s, with Michael Oldstone, he showed how persistent viral infections could also result in the deposition of immune complexes, leading to autoimmunity.

== Personal life ==
Dixon was married to Marion (née Edwards), whom he met at the University of Minnesota; they had a daughter and two sons. He died from heart disease on February 8, 2008, in La Jolla.

== Awards and societies ==
Dixon's awards include the Gairdner Foundation International Award (1969), the Lasker Award (1975), the Dickson Prize in Medicine (1976), and the Rous-Whipple Award (1979). He was elected a member of the United States National Academy of Sciences in 1971.

He was president of the American Association of Immunologists and the American Association of Pathologists, and served as editor of the review journal Advances in Immunology. In 1981, he was a founding member of the World Cultural Council.
