= Michael M. E. Johns =

American physician (born 1942)

Michael M.E. Johns II
- Born: Michael Marieb Edward Johns
- Education: Wayne State University, University of Michigan
- Known for: Contributions to head and neck cancer surgery; reforms in medical education
- Scientific career
- Fields: Otolaryngology, Health Policy, Surgery, Surgical Oncology
- Workplaces: Emory University

Michael Johns (born 1942) is an American physician. He is a professor in both public health and medicine at Emory University. He is emeritus executive vice president for health affairs at Emory as well as emeritus president, CEO, and chairman of the board of Emory Healthcare. He also served as Emory University's fifth chancellor.

== Education ==
Michael Marieb Edward Johns II received his B.S. degree in biology from Wayne State University in 1964. He received a Doctor of Medicine degree from University of Michigan in 1969 and was elected to the Alpha Omega Alpha honor society. He completed his internship and residency training at the University of Michigan in otolaryngology in 1975.

== Career ==
Johns was a member of the U.S. Army Medical Corps and served as assistant chief of otolaryngology at Walter Reed Army Medical Center from 1975 to 1977. He joined the department of otolaryngology and maxillofacial surgery at University of Virginia School of Medicine in 1977. Johns joined Johns Hopkins University School of Medicine in 1984 to be professor and chair of the department of otolaryngology-head and neck surgery. He later served as associate dean for clinical practice at Johns Hopkins and became dean of the medical faculty and vice president for medicine at Johns Hopkins in 1990.

Johns joined Emory University in 1996 to be executive vice president for health affairs and to lead the Robert W. Woodruff Health Sciences Center. He led health sciences at Emory until 2007, when he became chancellor of Emory University, serving until 2012. Johns served as interim head of Michigan Medicine (formerly the University of Michigan Health System) in 2014 and as interim head of Emory's Woodruff Health Sciences Center in 2015.
