= Natalizumab =

Medication used to treat multiple sclerosis and Crohn's disease

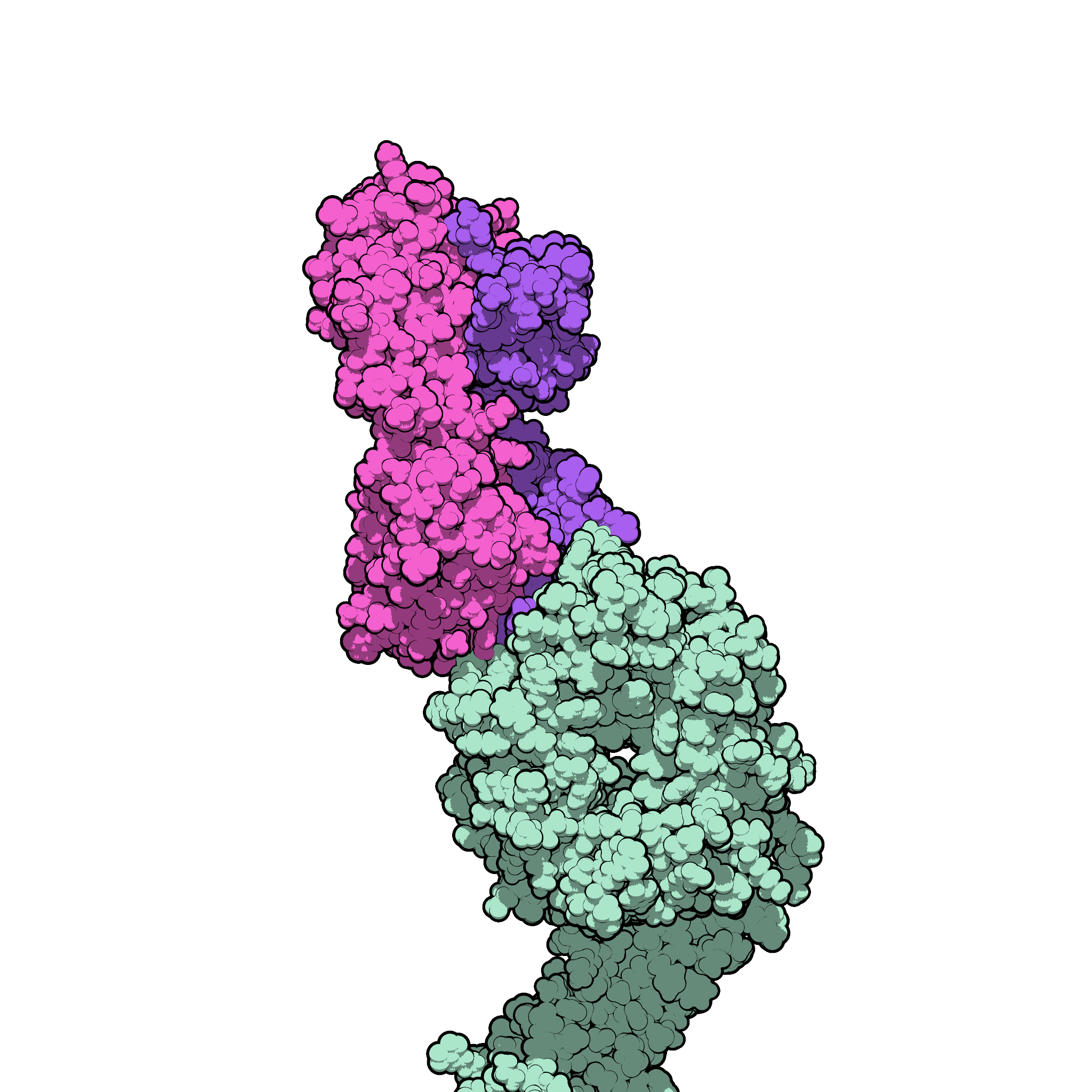
- Natalizumab Fab fragment bound to the headpiece of an α4-integrin. From PDB 4IRZ.

Monoclonal antibody
- Type: Whole antibody
- Source: Humanized (from mouse)
- Target: alpha-4 integrin

Clinical data
- Trade names: Tysabri, others
- Other names: AN100226M, Antegren
- Biosimilars: natalizumab-sztn, Tyruko
- AHFS/Drugs.com: Monograph
- MedlinePlus: a605006
- License data: US DailyMed: Natalizumab
- Pregnancy category: AU: C
- Routes of administration: Intravenous
- ATC code: L04AG03 (WHO)

Legal status
- Legal status: AU: S4 (Prescription only); CA: ℞-only Schedule D; UK: POM (Prescription only); US: ℞-only; EU: Rx-only; In general: ℞ (Prescription only)

Pharmacokinetic data
- Bioavailability: n/a
- Elimination half-life: 11 ± 4 days

Identifiers
- CAS Number: 189261-10-7
- DrugBank: DB00108
- ChemSpider: none
- UNII: 3JB47N2Q2P
- KEGG: D06886
- ChEMBL: ChEMBL1201607
- CompTox Dashboard (EPA): DTXSID90920506

Chemical and physical data
- Molar mass: 149 kg/mol

Natalizumab, sold under the brand name Tysabri among others, is a medication used to treat multiple sclerosis and Crohn's disease. It is a humanized monoclonal antibody against the cell adhesion molecule α4-integrin. It is given by intravenous infusion. The drug is believed to work by reducing the ability of inflammatory immune cells to attach to and pass through the cell layers lining the intestines and blood–brain barrier.

Natalizumab is a monoclonal antibody which targets a protein called α4β1 integrin on white blood cells involved in inflammation. By attaching to integrin, natalizumab is thought to stop white blood cells from entering the brain and spinal cord tissue, thereby reducing inflammation and the resulting nerve damage.

The most common side effects are urinary tract infection, nasopharyngitis (inflammation of the nose and throat), headache, dizziness, nausea, joint pain and tiredness.

Natalizumab was approved for medical use in the United States in 2004. It was subsequently withdrawn from the market by its manufacturer after it was linked with three cases of the rare neurological condition progressive multifocal leukoencephalopathy (PML) when administered in combination with interferon beta-1a, another immunosuppressive drug often used in the treatment of multiple sclerosis. After a review of safety information and no further deaths, the drug was returned to the US market in 2006 under a special prescription program. As of June 2009, ten cases of PML were known. However, twenty-four cases of PML had been reported since its reintroduction by October 2009, showing a sharp rise in the number of fatalities and prompting a review of the chemical for human use by the European Medicines Agency. By 2010, 31 cases of PML were attributed to natalizumab while by 2018 this had risen to 757 cases. The US Food and Drug Administration (FDA) did not withdraw the drug from the market as benefits outweigh the risks. In the European Union, it has been approved only for multiple sclerosis and only by itself as the initial cases of PML, and later the fatalities, were said by the manufacturers to be linked to the use of previous medicines by the person.

== Medical uses ==
In the United states, natalizumab is indicated for the treatment of multiple sclerosis and Crohn's disease. It is indicated to treat clinically isolated syndrome (a single, first occurrence of multiple sclerosis symptoms); relapsing-remitting disease (a fluctuation between episodes of new neurological symptoms followed by periods of stability) and active secondary progressive disease (gradual disability worsening with continued relapses following a relapsing-remitting course).

Natalizumab offers a limited improvement in efficacy compared to other treatments for multiple sclerosis, but due to the lack of information about long-term use, as well as potentially fatal adverse events, reservations have been expressed over the use of the drug outside of comparative research with existing medications. Natalizumab is used as a monotherapy.

In the European Union, natalizumab is indicated as single disease modifying therapy in adults with highly active relapsing remitting multiple sclerosis for the following patient groups:

- People with highly active disease activity despite a full and adequate course of treatment with at least one disease modifying therapy (DMT), or
- People with rapidly evolving severe relapsing remitting multiple sclerosis defined by two or more disabling relapses in one year, and with one or more Gadolinium enhancing lesions on brain MRI or a significant increase in T2 lesion load as compared to a previous recent MRI.

== Adverse effects ==
The US prescribing information for natalizumab contains a boxed warning about the increased risk of progressive multifocal leukoencephalopathy, a viral infection of the brain that usually leads to death or severe disability. Risk factors for the development of progressive multifocal leukoencephalopathy include the presence of anti-JCV antibodies (antibodies to the JC virus, a typically harmless virus carried by most humans), longer duration of therapy and prior use of immunosuppressants.

Three cases of PML were noted in clinical trials in 2005 leading to the drug being temporarily pulled from the market until it was re-introduced beginning in 2006. Cases began to be reported again in 2008, with two cases being reported to the FDA in August 2008 and two more cases being announced in December 2008. By January 2010, the FDA had noted a total of 31 confirmed cases of PML, with the chance of developing the infection increasing as the number of infusions received by a patient increased. Because of this association, the drug label and package insert accompanying the drug was updated to include this information. As of February 2012, there were 212 confirmed cases of PML among 99,571 patients treated with natalizumab (2.1 cases per 1000 patients). All 54 patients with PML for whom samples were available before the diagnosis were positive for anti–JC virus antibodies. When the risk of PML was evaluated according to three risk factors, it was lowest among the patients who had used natalizumab for the shortest periods, those who had used few if any immunosuppressant drugs to treat MS in the past, and those who were negative for anti–JC virus antibodies. The incidence of PML in the low risk group was estimated to be 0.09 cases, or less, per 1000 patients. Patients who had taken natalizumab for longer, from 25 to 48 months, who were positive for anti–JC virus antibodies, or had taken immunosuppressants before the initiation of natalizumab therapy had the highest risk of developing PML. Their risk was 123 times higher than the low risk group. (incidence, 11.1 cases per 1000 patients [95% CI, 8.3 to 14.5]). While none of them had taken the drug in combination with other disease-modifying treatments, previous use of MS treatments increases the risk of PML between 3 and 4-fold. In 2016, the EMA recommended that all people taking natalizumab should undergo full MRI scans at least once a year due to concerns of progressive multifocal leukoencephalopathy (PML). In addition, more frequent MRI scans (e.g. every 3 to 6 months) using simplified protocols should be considered for those at higher risk of PML.

Postmarketing surveillance in early 2008 revealed that 0.1% of people taking natalizumab experienced clinically significant liver injury, leading to the FDA, EMEA and manufacturers recommending that the medication be discontinued in patients with jaundice or other evidence of significant liver damage. This rate is comparable to other immune-suppressing drugs. Evidence of hepatotoxicity in the form of elevated blood levels of bilirubin and liver enzymes can appear as soon as six days after an initial dose; reactions are unpredictable and may appear even if the patient does not react to previous treatment. Such signs reoccur upon rechallenge in some patients, indicating that damage is not coincidental. In the absence of any blockage, these liver function tests are predictors of severe liver injury with possible sequelae of liver transplantation or death.

Common adverse effects include fatigue and allergic reactions with a low risk of anaphylaxis, headache, nausea, colds and exacerbation of Crohn's disease in a minority of patients with the condition. Adolescents with Crohn's disease experience headache, fever and exacerbation of Crohn's disease.

About 6% of the people in studies developed long-lasting antibodies against natalizumab, which reduced the medicine's effectiveness.

== Mechanism of action ==
Structure of a generic antibody

Natalizumab is a humanized monoclonal antibody against alpha-4 (α4) integrin, the first drug developed in the class of selective adhesion molecule inhibitors. α4-integrin is required for white blood cells to move into organs, and natalizumab's mechanism of action is believed to be the prevention of immune cells from crossing blood vessel walls to reach affected organs.

=== Multiple sclerosis ===
The symptom-causing lesions of MS are believed to be caused when inflammatory cells such as T-lymphocytes pass through the blood–brain barrier through interaction with receptors on the endothelial cells. Natalizumab appears to reduce the transmission of immune cells into the central nervous system by interfering with the α4β7-integrin receptor molecules on the surfaces of cells. The effect appears to occur on endothelial cells expressing the VCAM-1 gene, and in parenchymal cells expressing the osteopontin gene. In animals used to model MS and test therapies, repeated administration of natalizumab reduced migration of leukocytes into the brain's parenchyma, and also reduced lesioning, though it is uncertain if this is clinically significant for humans.

Individuals with MS dosed with natalizumab demonstrated increased CD34-expressing cells, with research suggesting a peak in expression after 72 hours.

=== Crohn's disease ===
The interaction of the α4β7 integrin and the addressin (also known as MADCAM1) endothelial cell receptor is believed to contribute to the chronic bowel inflammation that causes Crohn's disease. Addressin is primarily expressed in the endothelium of venules in the small intestine and are critical in guiding T-lymphocytes to lymphatic tissues in Peyer's patches. In CD patients, sites of active inflammation of the bowel in CD patients have increased expression of addressin, suggesting a connection between the inflammation and the receptor. Natalizumab may block interaction between the α4β7 integrin and addressin at sites of inflammation. Animal models have found higher levels of VCAM-1 expression in mice with irritable bowel syndrome and the VCAM-1 gene may also play a part in CD but its role is not yet clear.

== Interactions ==
Natalizumab appears to interact with other immune-modulating drugs to increase the risk of progressive multifocal leukoencephalopathy (PML), an often-fatal opportunistic infection caused by the JC virus. In 2005, two people taking natalizumab in combination with interferon beta-1a developed PML. One died, and the other recovered with disabling sequelae. A third fatal case initially attributed to an astrocytoma was reported in a patient being treated for Crohn's disease. Though the patient was being treated with natalizumab in combination with azathioprine, corticosteroids and infliximab, indications of PML infection appeared only after natalizumab monotherapy was re-introduced. No deaths from progressive multifocal leukoencephalopathy have been linked to natalizumab when it was not combined with other immune-modulating drugs and other rates of opportunistic infections are not increased in patients taking natalizumab possibly due to the drug's mechanism of action. Other than a prior history of PML, there is no known method to identify patients at risk of developing PML. Natalizumab's label indicates that it is contraindicated for immunosuppressed individuals or those with a history of PML. Due to the uncertain risk of PML, natalizumab is only available through a restricted distribution program. By January 2010, the United States Food and Drug Administration reported a total of 31 confirmed cases of PML associated with natalizumab.

Though the small number of cases precludes conclusion on the ability of natalizumab alone to induce PML, its black box warning states that the drug has only been linked to PML when combined with other immune-modulating drugs and natalizumab is contraindicated for use with other immunomodulators. Corticosteroids may produce immunosuppression, and the Tysabri prescribing information recommends that people taking corticosteroids for the treatment of Crohn's disease have their doses reduced before starting natalizumab treatment. The risk of developing PML was later estimated to be 1 in 1,000 (0.1%) over 18 months though the longer term risks of PML are unknown.

== History ==
Biogen Idec announced the initiation of the first clinical trial of natalizumab as a potential cancer treatment as of September 2008.

== Society and culture ==
=== Legal status ===
Natalizumab was originally approved for treatment of multiple sclerosis in 2004, through the FDA's accelerated Fast Track program, due to the drug's efficacy in one-year clinical trials. In February 2005, four months after its approval, natalizumab was withdrawn voluntarily by the manufacturer after two cases of progressive multifocal leukoencephalopathy. Groups representing individuals with MS lobbied to have the drug returned to the US market and in June 2006, after recommendation by an advisory committee and a review of two years of safety and efficacy data, the FDA re-approved natalizumab for patients with all relapsing forms of MS (relapse-remitting, secondary-progressive, and progressive-relapsing) as a first-line or second-line therapy. Patients taking natalizumab must enter into a registry for monitoring. Natalizumab is the only drug after alosetron withdrawn for safety reasons that returned to the US market.

In April 2006, the Committee for Medicinal Products for Human Use recommended authorizing natalizumab to treat relapsing-remitting MS, and natalizumab was approved for medical use in the European Union in June 2006.

Health Canada added natalizumab to Schedule F of the Food and Drug Regulations in April 2008, as a prescription drug requiring oversight from a physician.

In 2007, the EMA rejected the application to market natalizumab for Crohn's disease due to concerns over its risk/benefit ratio. In January 2008, the FDA approved it for the induction of remission and maintenance of remission for moderate to severe Crohn's disease.

=== Biosimilars ===
In July 2023, the Committee for Medicinal Products for Human Use (CHMP) of the European Medicines Agency (EMA) adopted a positive opinion, recommending the granting of a marketing authorization for the medicinal product Tyruko, intended for the treatment of multiple sclerosis. The applicant for this medicinal product is Sandoz GmbH. Tyruko was approved for medical use in the European Union in September 2023.

In August 2023, the FDA approved Tyruko (natalizumab-sztn) and granted approval to Sandoz Inc.
