= Opendra Narayan =

HIV/AIDS researcher

Opendra "Bill" Narayan (November 28, 1936 – December 24, 2007) was an HIV/AIDS researcher at the Johns Hopkins School of Medicine and the University of Kansas Medical Center. A veterinarian, Narayan researched animal models of HIV. His focus on finding a vaccine for retroviral infection had some success against a monkey retrovirus, SIV, and he is best known for engineering a type of HIV that could cause AIDS-like disease in monkeys.

== Education and training ==
Born in Guyana, Narayan earned his doctorate in veterinary medicine (DVM) from the University of Toronto in 1963. In 1970, he received a PhD in virology from the University of Guelph.

Narayan trained as a postdoctoral researcher with renowned neurovirologist Richard T. Johnson at the Johns Hopkins School of Medicine beginning in 1972.

== Career ==
Narayan remained at Johns Hopkins as a faculty member and became director of the Retrovirus Biology Laboratory. Narayan left Johns Hopkins in 1992. He moved to the University of Kansas, where he was named Distinguished Professor and director of the Marion Merrell Dow Laboratory of Viral Pathogenesis. Narayan remained at Kansas until his death in 2007. While at the University of Kansas, Narayan received nearly $50 million in grants, including almost $20 million from the National Institutes of Health.

== Honors ==
Narayan was presented with the Pioneer in NeuroVirology Award by the International Society for NeuroVirology (ISNV) at the 7th International Symposium on NeuroVirology held in Philadelphia, Pennsylvania, in 2006.

== Controversy ==
Simon Watney has described Narayan's explanation of the spread of HIV/AIDS among gay males as 'uniquely disgusting' when he quotes Narayan's statement that:

the active sexual partner injects infected semen into the anus of the passive partner [...] These people have sex twenty to thirty times a night [...] A man comes along and goes from anus to anus and in a single night will act as a mosquito transferring infected cells on his penis. When this is practiced for a year, with a man having three thousand sexual intercourses', one can readily understand this massive epidemic that is currently upon us.

— Simon Watney, Policing Desire: Pornography, Aids, and the Media, (1997) Page 111
