= Progressive multifocal leukoencephalopathy =

Viral disease affecting human brains

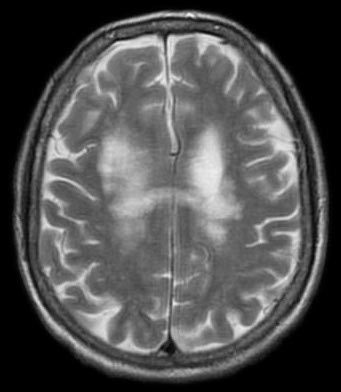
- T2-weighted MRI showing progressive multifocal leukoencephalopathy
- Specialty: Neurology

Progressive multifocal leukoencephalopathy (PML) is a rare and often fatal viral disease characterized by progressive damage or inflammation of the white matter of the brain at multiple locations. It is caused by the JC virus, which is normally present and kept under control by the immune system. The JC virus is harmless except in cases of weakened immune systems. In general, PML has a mortality rate of 30–50% in the first few months, and those who survive can be left with varying degrees of neurological disabilities.

PML occurs almost exclusively in patients with severe immune deficiency, most commonly among patients with acquired immune deficiency syndrome (AIDS), but people on chronic immunosuppressive medications including chemotherapy are also at increased risk of PML, such as patients with transplants, Hodgkin's lymphoma, multiple sclerosis, psoriasis, rheumatoid arthritis, and other autoimmune diseases.

== Signs and symptoms ==
Symptoms can develop over several weeks to months, and they depend on location of damage in the brain and the degree of damage. The most prominent symptoms are "clumsiness, progressive weakness, and visual, speech, and sometimes personality changes". The lesions affecting the parietal and occipital lobes of the brain can lead to a phenomenon known as alien hand syndrome.

== Cause ==
=== JC virus infection ===
The cause of PML is a type of polyomavirus called the JC virus (JCV), after the initials of the person (John Cunningham) from whose tissue the virus was first successfully cultured. Publications indicate 39 to 58% of the general population are seropositive for antibodies to JCV, indicating current or previous infection with the virus. Other publications put the percentage at 70 to 90% of the general population. JCV causes persistent asymptomatic infection in about one-third of the adult population, based on viral shedding into the urine from the site of asymptomatic infection in the kidney. The virus causes disease only when the immune system has been severely weakened.

=== Immunosuppression ===
PML is most common in people with HIV1 infection; prior to the advent of effective antiretroviral therapy, as many as 5% of people with AIDS eventually developed PML. Why PML occurs more frequently in people with AIDS than in other immunosuppressive conditions is unclear; some research suggests the effects of HIV on brain tissue, or on JCV itself, make JCV more likely to become active in the brain and increase its damaging inflammatory effects.

PML can also occur in people on immunosuppressive therapy, such as efalizumab, belatacept, and various transplant drugs, which are meant to weaken the immune system.

==== Multiple sclerosis medications ====
Natalizumab (Tysabri) was approved in 2004 by the FDA for the treatment of multiple sclerosis (MS). It is believed to work by preventing white blood cells from entering the brain. It was subsequently withdrawn from the market by its manufacturer after it was linked with three cases of PML. All three initial cases were taking natalizumab in combination with interferon beta-1a. After a safety review, the drug was returned to the market in 2006 as a monotherapy for MS under a special prescription program. As of May 2011, over 130 cases of PML had been reported in MS patients, all in patients who had taken natalizumab for more than a year. While none of them had taken the drug in combination with other disease-modifying treatments, previous use of MS treatments increases the risk of PML between three- and four-fold. The estimated prevalence of PML in MS is 1.5 cases per thousand natalizumab users. Around 20% of MS patients with PML die, and most of the rest are very disabled. One case study describes an MS patient who, during a 4-year course of dimethyl fumarate, developed PML and died.

Fingolimod (Gilenya) was approved in 2010 by the FDA for MS. In 2015, the first case of PML and a case of "probable PML" were reported by two Gilenya users that could not be tied to previous immunosuppressant therapies. These new cases are now being added to the drug information sheet included with every prescription (i.e. the "drug label").

== Pathogenesis ==
PML is a demyelinating disease, in which the myelin sheath covering the axons of nerve cells is gradually destroyed, impairing the transmission of nerve impulses. It affects the subcortical white matter, particularly that of the parietal and occipital lobes. PML destroys oligodendrocytes and produces intranuclear inclusions. It is similar to another demyelinating disease, MS, but progresses much more quickly. The breakdown of myelin is proportional to the degree of immunocompromise.

== Diagnosis ==
PML is diagnosed in a patient with a progressive course of the disease, finding JC virus DNA in spinal fluid together with consistent white-matter lesions on brain magnetic resonance imaging (MRI); alternatively, a brain biopsy is diagnostic when the typical histopathology of demyelination, bizarre astrocytes, and enlarged oligodendroglial nuclei are present, coupled with techniques showing the presence of JC virus.

Characteristic evidence of PML on brain CT scan images are multifocal, noncontrast enhancing hypodense lesions without mass effect, but MRI is far more sensitive than CT. The most common area of involvement is the cortical white matter of frontal and parieto occipital lobes, but lesions may occur anywhere in the brain, such as the basal ganglia, external capsule, and posterior cranial fossa structures such as the brain stem and cerebellum. Although typically multifocal, natalizumab-associated PML is often monofocal, predominantly in the frontal lobe.

== Treatment ==
No drugs effectively inhibit or cure the virus infection without toxicity. Therefore, treatment aims at reversing the immune deficiency to slow or stop the disease progress. In patients on immunosuppression, this means stopping the drugs or using plasma exchange to accelerate the removal of the biologic agent that put the person at risk for PML.

In HIV-infected people, this may mean starting highly active antiretroviral therapy (HAART). AIDS patients starting HAART after being diagnosed with PML tend to have a slightly longer survival time than patients who were already on HAART and then develop PML. Some AIDS patients with PML have been able to survive for several years, with HAART. A rare complication of effective HAART is immune reconstitution inflammatory syndrome (IRIS), in which increased immune system activity actually increases the damage caused by the JCV infection; although IRIS can often be managed with medication, it is extremely dangerous in PML.

Cidofovir was studied as possible treatment for PML and has been used on a case-by-case basis, working in some, but not others.

Cytarabine (also known as ARA-C), a chemotherapy drug used to treat certain cancers, has been prescribed on an experimental basis for a small number of non-AIDS PML patients, and stabilized the neurological condition of a minority of these patients. One patient regained some cognitive function lost as a result of PML.

In June 2010, the first case report appeared of a PML patient being successfully treated with the antimalarial drug mefloquine with activity against the JC virus. The patient cleared the virus and had no further neurological deterioration. Two case reports of using interleukin-2 successfully have been published. Some success have been reported with mirtazapine, but this has not been demonstrated in clinical trials. A number of drugs work against JC virus in cell culture, but no proven, effective therapy is known in humans. For example, brincidofovir (1-O-hexadecyloxypropyl-cidofovir /CMX001) available as Tembexa, suppresses JCV, but has been found to have toxicity at therapeutic dosage. Infusion of donor T cells specific to the related BK polyomavirus has shown possible effect in treating PML in one small study by Katy Rezvani's group, but needs further study. In December 2021, Cellevolve announced it is launching a clinical trial for the treatment of PML utilizing BK virus specific T-cells (VSTs).

== Prognosis ==
One-third to one-half of people with PML die in the first few months following diagnosis, depending on the severity of their underlying disease. Survivors can be left with variable degrees of neurological disability.

== See also ==
- Joseph Berger (neurologist)
- Leukoencephalopathy
- Leukoencephalopathy with vanishing white matter
- Toxic leukoencephalopathy
- Pedro Zamora
- It's My Party (film)
