= North Garland High School =

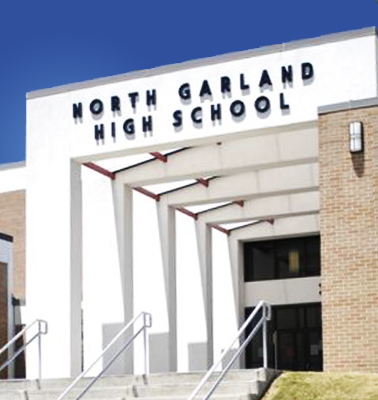

Location
- 2109 W Buckingham Road; Garland, Dallas County, Texas 75042; United States; 32°55′50″N 96°39′33″W

Information
- School type: Public high school
- Opened: 1971
- School district: Garland Independent School District
- Superintendent: Dr. Lopez, Ed.D.
- CEEB code: 442732
- Principal: John Fishpaw
- Staff: 203.2
- Faculty: 204.2
- Teaching staff: 167.5
- Grades: 9-12
- Enrollment: 2,924 (2024-25)
  - Grade 9: 804 (as of 2024-25)
  - Grade 10: 777 (24-25)
  - Grade 11: 712 (24-25)
  - Grade 12: 631 (24-25)
- Average class size: 18.4 English or Language Arts; 20.2 Foreign Languages; 20.7 Math; 23.3 Science; 28.1 Social Studies
- Student to teacher ratio: 17.5
- Language: English • Spanish • Vietnamese and other languages
- Hours in school day: 7
- Colors: Red and Black
- Fight song: Minnesota Rouser
- Athletics: UIL 6A
- Mascot: Raider Sam
- Newspaper: The Raider Echo
- Yearbook: Marauder
- Website: www.garlandisdschools.net/nghs

North Garland High School is a public secondary school located in Garland, Texas (USA).

== Overview ==
North Garland High School enrolls students in grades 9-12 and is a part of the Garland Independent School District. The school is known for the endorsement of its highly competitive Math, Science, and Technology Magnet Program. The school also provides other notable magnet programs, such as Accelerated Math and Science, Pathways in Technology Early College High School (P-TECH), Early College High School, Dual Credit, and Advanced Placement.

== History ==
North Garland High School opened during the 1971-1972 school year as the third high school to serve the school district. The Class of 1973 was the first graduating class.

North Garland's school colors (red and black) were chosen by selecting one color from the two high schools Garland High School and South Garland High School. On the opening of the school on 1971, students had a choice between a French Raider Sam and a Western Raider Sam. The drill team, assuming that the French Raider Sam was going to receive the popular vote, selected their names to be the Mam'selles and La'Petites to match the French theme. When the results were in, the Western Raider Sam received the popular vote, which is why the names of the drill team do not correlate with the current mascot.

In 1974, a North Garland gymnast won Garland ISD's first national high school title.

In 1998, North Garland High School established the Math, Science, and Technology Program (MST). MST offers specialized courses in engineering, computer science, multimedia applications, environmental science, telecommunications, and medical studies.

In 2010, North Garland High School was named by the National Center for Educational Achievement (NCEA) as a 2010 Higher Performing School.

In 2011, the school was rated a "Recognized Campus" by the Texas Education Agency.

== Academic programs ==
North Garland's Mathematics, Science, and Technology (MST) Magnet Program was established in 1998. The program endorses a number of concentrations of study, including computer science, multimedia applications, telecommunications, medical academic studies, medical technical studies, engineering, comprehensive science, and interdisciplinary studies. Students in the MST program concentrate on a particular area of study and by achieving requirements, the student can qualify for an endorsement on the subject of study.

=== Accelerated Math and Science (AMS) ===
The AMS program is a magnet program that sorts students into three tracks sorted by difficulty. The tracks offer courses from Algebra II to DC Differential Equations and DC Linear Algebra. AP Statistics is also optionally offered. AMS was developed to work with the MST program.

=== Math, Science, and Technology ===
The MST program offers a variety of electives to prepare students for career pathways. Students earn an endorsement after finishing their chosen pathway. North Garland offers the following pathways:

- Animation
- Architecture
- Networking (CISCO IT)
- Computer Science
- Medical Science
- Engineering (Project Lead the Way)

The Health, Science, Technology program offers extra medical courses and skills when taken with MST.

=== Pathways in Technology Early College High School (PTECH) ===
The PTECH program allows students to earn a high school diploma, an industry recognized associate degree, and gain experience. Students can also earn up to 60+ college credit hours, 4 year university options, internships, and interviews. Similar to MST, PTECH offers sets of courses to target certain career areas.

=== Dual Credit (DC) ===
The Dual Credit program covers a variety of courses and develops a college transcript, free tuition, remote college classes, and optimizing resources.

The Health, Science, Technology program offers extra medical courses and skills when taken with DC.

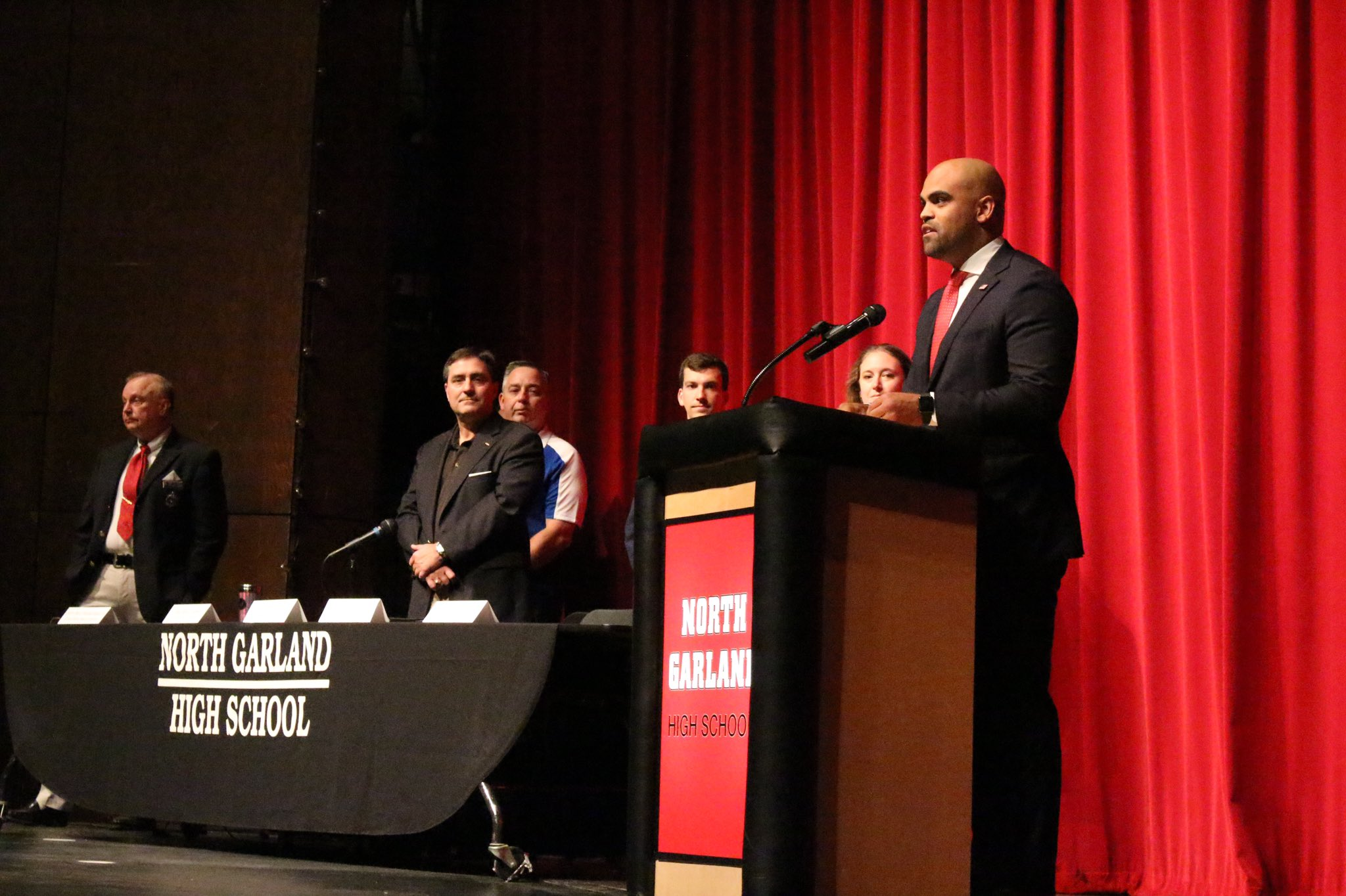
Congressman Colin Allred at Service Academy Day at North Garland HS in 2019.

== Curriculum ==
North Garland is one of the five schools in the district that implements a block scheduling system, where students take four classes per day on alternating school days. North Garland developed the system in the spring of 1991 as part of the campus improvement plan. It allows students to earn eight graduation credits per year compared to seven credits on the traditional system.

== Sports ==
North Garland High School has had a strong history of sports, and the school currently offers the following sports to students: Baseball, Basketball, Cheerleading, Cross Country, Drill Team, Football, Golf, Powerlifting, Soccer, Softball, Swimming, Tennis, Track, and Volleyball. North Garland is classified as an UIL Class 5A Classification for the 2013-2014 school year and was put into the UIL Class 6A Region 2 District 11 for the 2014-2015 school year.

=== UIL ===
The Texas Education Agency lists 17 athletic UIL activities that North Garland High School participates in. They are:

- Baseball
- Basketball*
- Cross Country*
- Football
- Golf*
- Soccer*
- Softball
- Team Tennis
- Tennis*
- Track*
- Volleyball

*Means the activity has two separate divisions, one for boys and one for girls.

Additionally, North Garland High School is also listed under Academic UIL, Marching Band UIL, and Spirit UIL.

== Feeder patterns ==
Garland ISD is a Free Choice school district, which allows the parent to choose which school his or her children want to attend within the district.

Jackson Technology Center feeds into North Garland High School for students continuing on the MST Program. Beaver Technology Center and Watson Technology Center feed students continuing on the MST Program to Jackson Technology Center, and ultimately into North Garland High School.

== Statistics (per most recent report data) ==
=== Student Counts ===
The average class sizes reported are the following:

- English and Language Arts: 18.4 students
- Foreign Languages: 20.2 students
- Mathematics: 20.7 students
- Science: 23.3 students
- Social Studies: 28.1 students

On average, class sized are slightly-moderately higher than the district average, and moderately higher than the state average.

The attendance rate for students at the school is 93.5%, compared with a state average of 96%. 71.1% of the students at North Garland are economically disadvantaged, 5.3% enroll in special education (and also has an 8.4% mobility rate), and 32.3% are emergent bilingual / English learners.

The dropout rate of North Garland High School was 1.0% in the 2023-24 school year. In that same year, 90.7% of the student base graduated.

=== Testing Data ===
In the 2023-24 school year, 79.1% of the year's graduates took either the SAT or ACT. The average SAT score was 975, while the average ACT score was 19.3. On average, the highest scoring and highest testing participating racial demographic was the Asian demographic (96.1% tested, 1134 SAT average, 25.5 ACT average). On the other hand, American Indians had the lowest testing turnout; and also had the lowest average scores for the SAT. Due to small group confidentiality, the only racial demographic with available ACT data is the Asian demographic, with an average ACT of 25.5.

Economically disadvantaged students on average scored a 950 on the SAT, lower than the state average. The tester turnout of the economic disadvantage demographic was 92.5%.

=== Demographics ===
The ethnic makeup of the school's students is 49.4% Hispanic, 12.1% African American, 9.6% White, 22.2% Asian/Pacific Islander, and 4.3% American Indian. The ethnic makeup of the school's teachers is 47.9% White, 26.9% African American, 17.3% Hispanic, 4.2% American Indian, 3.5% Pacific Islander, and 0.1% Asian. Teacher of two or more races make up 0% of the teacher base.

Most teachers at the school carry 11–20 years of experience (29.2%). 22.6% of teachers have 1–5 years of experience, 20% have 6–10 years, 15.1% have 21–30 years, 10.7 are beginning teachers, and 2.4% have more than 30 years of experience.

=== AP ===
North Garland's AP program currently offers 35 different AP courses, most of which expand on mathematics, science, English language arts, or social studies.

=== Distinctions ===
North Garland High School currently has all seven TEA distinction designations:

- Academic Achievement in Reading / Language Arts
- Academic Achievement in Mathematics
- Academic Achievement in Science
- Academic Achievement in Social Studies
- Top 25% Comparative Academic Growth
- Top 25%: Comparative Closing the Gaps
- Postsecondary Readiness

The NCEA has ranked North Garland High School as a Higher Performing School in 2009-10 and in 2010-11.

Additionally, North Garland High School has been ranked by The Washington Post and U.S. News & World Report. The U.S. News & World Report has given the school Silver in Best High Schools from 2012-13 to 2017-18 and gave the school the National rank in the same category in 2018-19. The Washington Post has given North Garland the categorization of "Most Challenging High Schools" from 2013-14 to 2016-17.

North Garland High School has been a National AVID Demonstration School since 2014-15.

== Incidents ==
According to a local news article published by NBC on May 24, 2023, a fight broke out on campus. A student resource officer of the school reportedly slammed a student to the ground. Actions committed by the SRO and student were reviewed. In total, 10 students involved with the fighting were sent home.

== Notable alumni ==
- Chris August - Christian music singer and record producer in Franklin, Tennessee. Graduated 2000.
- Tyson Ballou - Male Supermodel, graduated in 1995.
- Eric Bassey - Former Safety for the Buffalo Bills and St. Louis Rams of the NFL. Graduated 2001.
- Brett Beavers - Country music songwriter in Nashville, Tennessee. Graduated 1981.
- Amy Farrington - actress, Graduated 1985.
- Edorian McCullough - Former sprinter and American football cornerback and running back.
- Michael Phillips - Historian, author of White Metropolis: Race, Ethnicity, and Religion in Dallas, 1841-2001.
- Joe Walter - is a former tackle who played thirteen seasons with the Cincinnati Bengals in the National Football League. Graduated 1981.
- Anthony Njokuani - Professional Mixed Martial Artist. Former WEC Fighter & First Nigerian In The UFC.
- Chidi Njokuani - Professional Mixed Martial Artist. Formerly In Bellator & Currently In The UFC.

== See also ==
- Garland Independent School District
- Garland, Texas
- Magnet School
- List of high schools in Texas
