= Technology Center =

A technology center or technology centre is a research center used for technology research.

Technology Center may also refer to:

- Arnold R. Burton Technology Center
- Beaver Technology Center
- Canadian Valley Technology Center
- Community technology center
- Entertainment Technology Center
- Francis Tuttle Technology Center
- Gordon Cooper Technology Center
- High Plains Technology Center
- Jackson Technology Center
- Linux Technology Center
- Macomb Mathematics Science Technology Center
- Metro Technology Center
- Miami Valley Career Technology Center
- National Law Enforcement and Corrections Technology Center
- National Space Science and Technology Center
- Northwest Technology Center
- Pioneer Technology Center
- Pittsburgh Technology Center
- Reese Technology Center
- Religious Technology Center
- Technology Center (Washington & Jefferson College)
- Tulsa Technology Center
- Watson Technology Center
- Western Technology Center
- Transportation Technology Center (TTC), a federal railway testing facility
- Transportation Technology Center, Inc., a private contractor operating the TTC for the federal government
- Technology Center station, the former name of a light rail station in San Jose, California

== See also ==
- Advanced Technology College, a technology school in Daytona Beach, FL that previously used the "Advanced Technology Center" name
- List of technology centers
- Telecentre
