= Melvin Bullitt =

American football player (born 1984)

- Bullitt in 2010

No. 33
- Position: Defensive back

Personal information
- Born: November 13, 1984 (age 42); Bryan, Texas, U.S.
- Listed height: 6 ft 1 in (1.85 m)
- Listed weight: 201 lb (91 kg)

Career information
- High school: Naaman Forest (Garland, Texas)
- College: Texas A&M (2003–2006)
- NFL draft: 2007: undrafted

Career history
- Indianapolis Colts (2007–2011)

Awards and highlights
- First-team All-Big 12 (2006)

Career NFL statistics
- Total tackles: 202
- Forced fumbles: 2
- Pass deflections: 13
- Interceptions: 7
- Stats at Pro Football Reference

Melvin Terry Bullitt (born November 13, 1984) is an American former professional football player who was a defensive back for five seasons with the Indianapolis Colts of the National Football League (NFL). He played college football for the Texas A&M Aggies. He was signed by the Colts as an undrafted free agent in 2007.

== Early life ==
Bullitt starred at Naaman Forest High School in Garland, Texas, where he was team MVP as a senior after totaling 78 tackles (43 solo), five pass deflections, and three interceptions. He also caught seven passes for 185 yards and a touchdown. He was teammates with Uche Nwaneri and Jacob Lacey.

Bullitt committed to Texas A&M at the end of his junior year.

== College career ==
As a freshman at Texas A&M University, Bullitt played in 8 games and produced 13 tackles for the Aggies. As a sophomore, he played in 12 games, finishing with 29 tackles, one interception, and one forced fumble. He started 10 games as a junior and compiled 59 tackles, two interceptions, and two forced fumbles. In the 2006 season, as a senior outside linebacker, he started in all 13 games had 84 tackles (26 solo), one interception, one fumble recovery, and eight pass deflections. After the season, he was named to the 2006 AT&T All-Big 12 Football First-team. He finished his college career with 183 tackles (80 solo), 10.5 tackles for losses, and four interceptions.

Bullitt changed positions every season. He began playing at corner, then free safety, then strong safety, and finally at outside linebacker.

== Professional career ==
=== 2007 season ===
Bullitt signed with the Indianapolis Colts as an undrafted free agent. In Week 5 he started in the Colts' dime package in a 33–14 victory over the Tampa Bay. He also saw action on defense in Week 9 against the New England as a replacement for injured Pro Bowl safety Bob Sanders. He had his most extensive playing time in Week 17 against Tennessee, when he entered the game in the second half after the Colts rested starters on both sides of the ball. Despite only playing the second half, he made a team-high 10 tackles.

=== 2008 season ===
During the 2008 season, Bullitt made three game-saving interceptions to seal victories for the Colts. In the 31–27 comeback win over the Texans on October 5, he intercepted a pass by quarterback Sage Rosenfels at the Indianapolis 22, with 42 seconds remaining in the game. On November 9, Steelers quarterback Ben Roethlisberger attempted to throw a touchdown pass into the end zone on the final play, but Bullitt intercepted the pass, preventing a Steelers comeback and sealing the 24–20 Colts win. The third game-saver occurred in the second matchup against the Texans on November 16, when Bullitt intercepted Rosenfels' pass at the Colts 35, with 32 seconds left in the game. In the same game, however, he missed a tackle near the line of scrimmage on running back Steve Slaton, who ran 71 yards for a touchdown. The Colts still won 33–27. Overall, Bullitt started nine games during the season, recording 42 solo tackles and four interceptions.

After the season, Bullitt received recognition from USA Today, which listed him on its annual "All-Joe" team.

Regarding his then-new role as a starter, Bullitt stated: "You always want to be a starter. That's why you come to the NFL. You don't want to come in and be a backup. You have to learn and you have to wait your time. You have to be patient, because anytime, an opportunity may come. Mine came this year, and I just wanted to go out and do the best I can and show people in the league I can play, too."

=== 2009 season ===
In January 2009, Bullitt was named the "emerging star" of the AFC South by an ESPN.com blogger; seven other players representing each division of the league were named one, as well. The players were picked based on their performances in the 2008 season.

His teammates elected him as one of the two 2009 special-teams captains. He started the season as a starter, replacing the injured Bob Sanders. He was named the "Unsung Hero of the Week" for week 3 by USA Today for his performance against the Arizona Cardinals. Bullitt forced a fumble and also prevented an airborne player from scoring a touchdown at the goal line.

Bullitt also made a crucial fourth-down stop in the 35–34 victory over the New England Patriots.

For the second straight year, Bullitt made USA Today's "All-Joe" team.

=== 2010–2011 seasons ===
In October 2010, Bullitt was placed on injured reserve and missed the rest of the season.

Three weeks into the 2011 season, Bullitt was placed on injured reserve. He was released following the 2011 season on March 9, 2012.

== NFL career statistics ==
Legend
**Bold**	Career high

=== Regular season ===
Year	Team	Games		Tackles					Interceptions					Fumbles			
Year	Team	GP	GS	Cmb	Solo	Ast	Sck	TFL	Int	Yds	TD	Lng	PD	FF	FR	Yds	TD
2007	IND	**15**	0	28	23	5	0.0	1	1	0	0	0	1	0	0	0	0
2008	IND	**15**	9	72	59	13	0.0	**3**	**4**	7	0	3	**9**	**1**	0	0	0
2009	IND	14	**12**	**77**	**63**	**14**	0.0	1	0	0	0	0	1	**1**	0	0	0
2010	IND	4	3	14	11	3	0.0	0	1	**19**	0	**19**	1	0	0	0	0
2011	IND	2	2	11	6	5	0.0	0	1	15	0	15	1	0	0	0	0
		50	26	202	162	40	0.0	5	7	41	0	19	13	2	0	0	0

=== Playoffs ===
Year	Team	Games		Tackles					Interceptions					Fumbles			
Year	Team	GP	GS	Cmb	Solo	Ast	Sck	TFL	Int	Yds	TD	Lng	PD	FF	FR	Yds	TD
2007	IND	1	0	1	0	**1**	0.0	0	0	0	0	0	0	0	0	0	0
2008	IND	1	0	4	3	**1**	0.0	0	0	0	0	0	1	0	0	0	0
2009	IND	**3**	**3**	**8**	**8**	0	0.0	0	0	0	0	0	**2**	0	0	0	0
		5	3	13	11	2	0.0	0	0	0	0	0	3	0	0	0	0

== Post-playing career ==
Following his retirement, Bullitt was named coach of the Legends Football League's Dallas Desire for the franchise's return in 2016. His brother Terrance will be his assistant.

Melvin maintains an athletic training facility with his family in Rowlett, Texas.

== Personal ==
During his playing career, Melvin wore the number 33 in honor of his father, Jerry Bullitt, who wore the number as a linebacker at Texas A&M. When asked about his number, Melvin stated: "I kind of feel like when I'm wearing (No. 33), a piece of my dad is with me when I'm on the field." Teammate Dominic Rhodes previously wore the same number for six seasons from 2001 to 2006 before playing the 2007 season for the Oakland Raiders. Once Rhodes returned to the Colts prior to the 2008 season, he tried to get the number back and even offered Bullitt serious money for it, but to no avail.
