= Naaman Forest High School =

Location
- 4843 Naaman Forest Boulevard; Garland, Dallas County, Texas 75040-2732; United States; 32°57′28.2″N 96°38′15.5″W

Information
- School type: high school
- Motto: “Together in Excellence”
- Opened: 1988
- School district: Garland Independent School District
- Superintendent: Bob Morrison (2013-2017), Ricardo Lopez (2018-present)
- Principal: Dr. Ansil Howard
- Teaching staff: 126.73 (FTE)
- Grades: 9-12
- Enrollment: 2,079 (2023-2024)
- Student to teacher ratio: 16.40
- Language: English
- Hours in school day: 7
- Colors: Green and orange
- Athletics: UIL 6A
- Mascot: Forest Ranger
- Rival: Sachse High School
- Newspaper: Timberline
- Yearbook: Forester
- Website: www.garlandisdschools.net/nfhs

Naaman Forest High School is a public secondary school located in Garland, Texas, United States. Naaman Forest enrolls students in grades 9-12 and is a part of the Garland Independent School District.

In 2009, the school was rated "academically acceptable" by the Texas Education Agency.

== History ==
NFHS is built on a 62.13-acre site, which backs up to a natural forest preserve. It opened in 1988 with grades 6-9. Naaman Forest dropped a lower grade and added a higher grade until it attained senior high school status in 1992. Naaman Forest today serves 2,600 students, compared with 836 students 20 years ago. Naaman Forest has been fully accredited by the Texas Education Agency and the Southern Association of Colleges and Schools since being founded.

== Statistics (per 2010) ==
The attendance rate for students at the school is 95%, compared with a state average of 96%. About 44% of the students at Naaman Forest are economically disadvantaged, 12% enroll in special education, 4% enroll in gifted and talented programs, 24% are enrolled in career and technology programs, and 28% are considered "limited English proficient".

The ethnic makeup of the school is 34% Hispanic, 23% African American, 27% White, non-Hispanic, 16% Asian/Pacific Islander, and less than 1% Native American.

The average class sizes at Naaman Forest are 22 students for English, 21 for foreign language, 23 for math, 22 for science, and 24 for social studies. Teachers at the school have, on average, 10 years of teaching experience and 7% of the teachers on staff are first-year teachers.

== Academic programs ==
=== Agriculture ===
Naaman Forest also features Future Farmers of America, which promotes classes such as horticulture, plant propagation, and many other fields.

=== Building trades ===
Building-trades classes expose students to the construction field. Each year, the project constructs a three-bedroom, two-bath house that is given to Garland Habitat. The house is built on the school campus and then it is moved to its home site within the city of Garland.

=== Medical ===
Naaman Forest also has a career-preparatory program known as clinical rotations. Through this, students receive on-site training at Presbyterian Hospital Dallas, Doctors Hospital at White Rock, and Baylor Hospital in Plano. In addition, Naaman is the site for GISD's emergency medical technician and pharmacy technician certification programs. Many clinical students participate in Health Occupation Students of America.

=== Achievements ===
Naaman received a Golden Performance Award from TEA for comparable improvement in math performance for the 2007-2008 school year. NFHS has been recognized by Newsweek as one of the top 1000 high schools in the nation based on Advanced Placement scores. In 2010 and 2011, the Naaman Forest Marching Band won its 20th and 21st consecutive First Division UIL ratings under the direction of band directors Larry Schnitzer, Gregory Taylor, and Matt Rush.

In 2011, the Naaman Forest Jazz Band became an award-winning jazz band, taking second place at the UTA Jazz Festival and first place at the TCU Jazz Festival under the direction of Jazz Band Director Gregory Taylor. In 2012, the Jazz Band repeated its second-place finish at the UTA Jazz Festival. Also, Taylor was awarded "Outstanding Director".

== Sports ==
Naaman Forest High School is most well known for its basketball team, which has been a very strong competitor for state titles throughout the history of the school. Naaman's basketball team in 2011-2012 went to the Final Four state finals, but in the end lost to Flower Mound Marcus. With this, Naaman Forest's basketball team is recognized as 10-5A District Champions, Bidistrict Champions, Area Champions, and Region II Champions. Naaman offers basketball, baseball, cross country, golf, tennis, softball, track and field, football, volleyball, and soccer. Naaman competed in the University Interscholastic League Class 5A classification for the 2013-2014 school year, but joined UIL's new Class 6A classification beginning in the 2014-2015 school year.

== Notable alumni ==
- David J. Love (1997) - Professor at Purdue University and leading wireless communications researcher.
- Nick Browne (1999) - Football player who played for the TCU Horned Frogs
- Melvin Bullitt (2003) - Football player who played for the Indianapolis Colts
- Uche Nwaneri (2003) - Football player who played for the Jacksonville Jaguars
- Jacob Lacey (2005) - Football player who played for the Indianapolis Colts, Detroit Lions, and Minnesota Vikings
- Terrance Bullitt (2009) - Football player who played in the CFL and for the Texas Tech Red Raiders
- John Harris (2010) - Football player who played in the CFL and for the Texas Longhorns
- Demarcus Holland (2012) - Basketball player who plays professionally in New Zealand
- Prince Ibeh (2012) - Basketball player who plays professionally in Mexico
- Reyna Reyes (2019) - Soccer player for the Mexico women's national soccer team and Portland Thorns FC
- Devean Deal (2021) – NFL linebacker for the Seattle Seahawks

== See also ==
- List of high schools in Texas
