= Tyler Lacy =

American football player (born 1999)

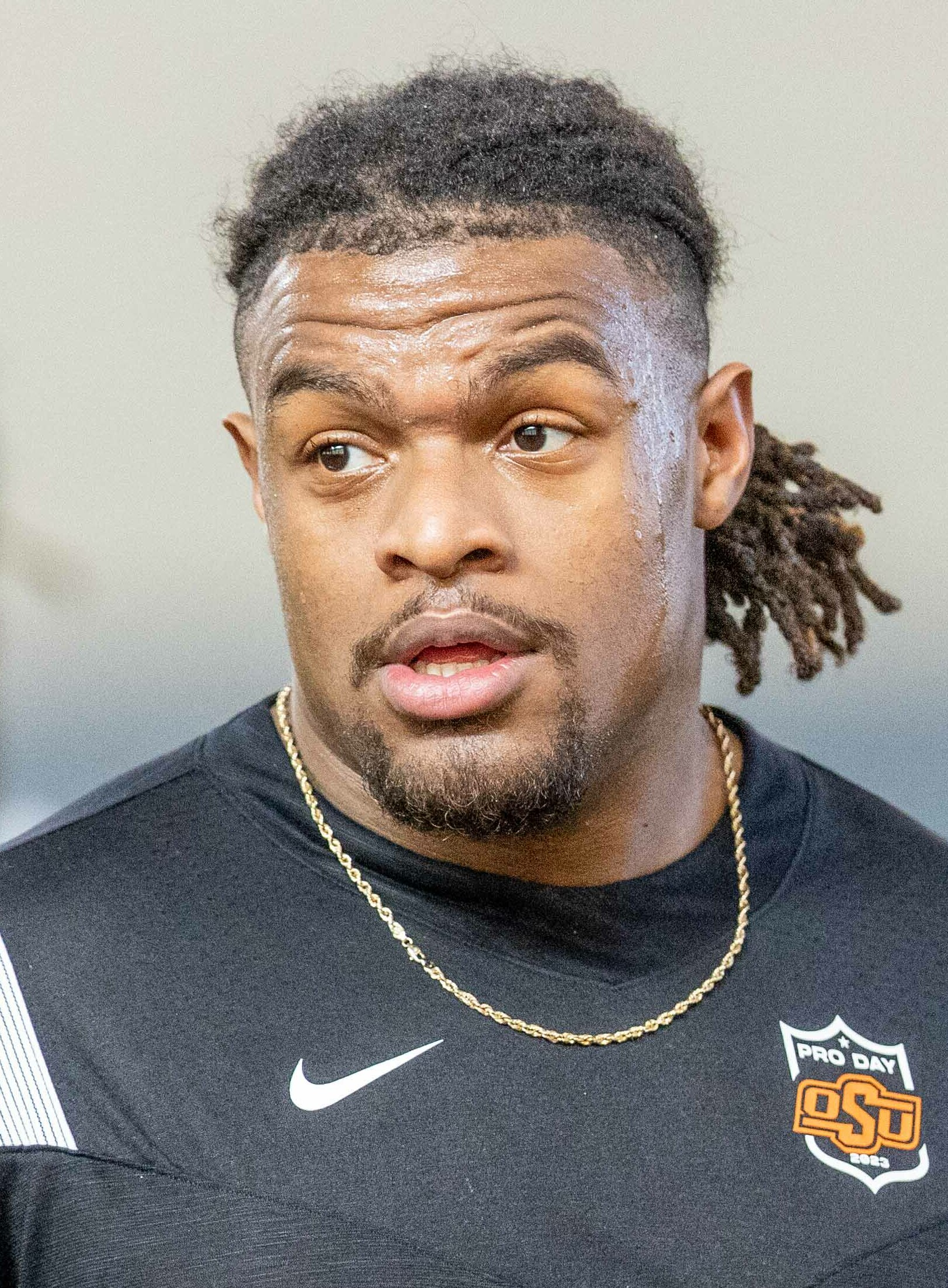
- Lacy with Oklahoma State in 2023

No. 93 – Detroit Lions
- Position: Defensive tackle
- Roster status: Active

Personal information
- Born: November 10, 1999 (age 26); Garland, Texas, U.S.
- Listed height: 6 ft 4 in (1.93 m)
- Listed weight: 300 lb (136 kg)

Career information
- High school: Sachse (Sachse, Texas)
- College: Oklahoma State (2018–2022)
- NFL draft: 2023: 4th round, 130th overall pick

Career history
- Jacksonville Jaguars (2023–2024); Detroit Lions (2025–present)

Career NFL statistics as of 2025
- Total tackles: 58
- Sacks: 1
- Pass deflections: 1
- Stats at Pro Football Reference

Tyler Lacy (born November 10, 1999) is an American professional football defensive tackle for the Detroit Lions of the National Football League (NFL). He played college football for the Oklahoma State Cowboys. Lacy was selected by the Jacksonville Jaguars in the fourth round of the 2023 NFL draft.

== Early life ==
Lacy was born on November 10, 1999, in Garland, Texas. He is a cousin of former National Football League (NFL) player Aaron Ross, a Super Bowl champion with the New York Giants. He attended Sachse High School, being a consensus three-star recruit, and committed to play college football at Oklahoma State after his graduation from the school.

== College career ==
As freshman in 2018, Lacy redshirted and saw no game action at Oklahoma State. The following year, he started all 10 games in which he appeared, missing three due to injury, totaling 20 tackles, including two for a loss, with one sack and two pass breakups. In 2020, he remained a starter and was named honorable mention all-conference after leading the team's defensive line with 32 tackles and eight TFLs, additionally posting four sacks and five quarterback hurries.

Lacy earned a second honorable mention all-conference selection in 2021, additionally being named to their first-team All-Academic squad as he posted 34 tackles, 11 for-loss, and 3.5 sacks. He also recorded eight hurries, the fifth-best in school history since they started tracking the statistic in 1982. His senior season in 2022 was cut short due to injury, and he finished it with 17 tackles, five quarterback hits and three sacks. Lacy finished his stint at Oklahoma State with 113 tackles, 30 for-loss and 11.5 sacks while appearing in 44 total games.

== Professional career ==
Pre-draft measurables
Height	Weight	Arm length	Hand span	Wingspan	40-yard dash	10-yard split	20-yard split	20-yard shuttle	Three-cone drill	Vertical jump	Broad jump	Bench press
6 ft 4 3/8 in (1.94 m)	279 lb (127 kg)	33 1/4 in (0.84 m)	10 7/8 in (0.28 m)	6 ft 6 3/8 in (1.99 m)	5.11 s	1.72 s	2.89 s	4.68 s	7.59 s	31.0 in (0.79 m)	9 ft 8 in (2.95 m)	30 reps
All values from NFL Combine/Pro Day

=== Jacksonville Jaguars ===
Lacy was selected by the Jacksonville Jaguars in the fourth round (130th overall) of the 2023 NFL draft. He appeared in 15 games and posted 12 tackles and a pass deflection in his first season.

On August 26, 2025, Lacy was waived by the Jaguars as part of final roster cuts.

=== Detroit Lions ===
On August 27, 2025, Lacy was claimed off waivers by the Detroit Lions.
