= Dorsey Elementary School =

Dorsey Elementary School may refer to:

- Julius Dorsey Elementary School - Dallas Independent School District - Dallas, Texas
- Norma Dorsey Elementary School - Garland Independent School District - Rowlett, Texas
