= Firewheel, Garland, Texas =

Masterplanned community in Texas, US

Firewheel is an upscale masterplanned community in the Dallas suburb of Garland, Texas. Development began principally in the late 1990s. Due to proximity to the President George Bush Turnpike, new development of residential homes and large scale retail has been constant. The majority of Firewheel is located in Dallas County with a small portion located in Collin County. Residents of Firewheel have relatively easy access to nearby areas of Garland, the central city of Dallas and nearby suburbs of Plano, Richardson & Sachse.

Popular attractions include the Firewheel Town Center Mall and the Firewheel Golf Park.

Firewheel is served by the Garland Independent School District in Dallas county and Plano Independent School District in Collin County.

Firewheel is served by Dallas Area Rapid Transit (DART) with bus lines that run to light rail stations in Downtown Garland and nearby Cityline (Richardson, Texas).

Rowlett Creek runs through Firewheel and is a major contributor to nearby Lake Ray Hubbard.
