= Edorian McCullough =

American football player and sprinter (born 1982)

Profile
- Position: Cornerback

Personal information
- Born: January 6, 1982 (age 44); Dallas, Texas
- Listed height: 5 ft 11 in (1.80 m)
- Listed weight: 190 lb (86 kg)

Career information
- College: Texas
- NFL draft: 2006: undrafted

Career history
- Jacksonville Jaguars (2006); Frankfurt Galaxy (2007); West Texas Roughnecks (2010)

Edorian McCullough (born January 6, 1982) is a former sprinter and American football cornerback and running back. He won the Texas high school championship in the 100 meters in consecutive years as a junior and senior and set district records with 340 rushing yards in a single game and 1,755 yards in a season. Rated as one of the top high school football players in the country, he signed with the University of Texas where he played in all 13 games as a true freshman and was selected as the Longhorns' Outstanding Defensive Newcomer Award. He left the University of Texas after one season due to academic issues and transferred to the City College of San Francisco, where he was selected as a Junior College All-American in 2004. He signed with Oregon State University in 2005, but he failed to meet the school's academic requirements and did not play for the Beavers. In 2006, he signed with the Jacksonville Jaguars as a free agent, but he was released in early September 2006 as part of the final cut before the start of the regular season. He was a member of the 2007 Frankfurt Galaxy team that lost the NFL Europa championship to the Hamburg Sea Devils in World Bowl XV. He signed with the West Texas Roughnecks of the Indoor Football League in 2010.

== North Garland ==
McCullough was a standout athlete in both track and football at North Garland High School in Garland, Texas. He drew attention when, as a high school freshman, he was recorded with a time of 4.3 in the 40-yard dash. At the Texas state track meet in May 2000, McCullough finished fourth in the 100 meters, fifth in the 200 meters and helped North Garland take third place in the 4 X 100 relay. At the 2001 Texas state track meet, he finished first in the 100 meters, second in the 200 meters, and led North Garland to a second-place finish in the 4 x 100 relay. As a senior in 2002, McCullough repeated as the state 100 meter champion, and drew large crowds to track meets in which he raced.

McCullough was a two-way star in football at North Garland, playing both cornerback and running back. In October 2000, he scored three touchdowns and rushed for 130 yards in a 35–16 win over North Mesquite High School. As a junior, he rushed for over 1,000 yards in 2000 and led the North Garland Raiders to their first appearance in the playoffs since 1991. As a senior, he set a district record with 340 rushing yards in an October 2001 victory over South Garland High School. He also broke the district record for rushing yards in a season with 1,755 yards and 16 touchdowns as a senior. The Dallas Morning News summed up McCullough's accomplishments as a senior: "One of Edorian McCullough's biggest assets is his speed. It is what helped him rush for more than 1,700 yards this season as a running back, shut down an entire side of the field at cornerback and win the state championship in the 100 meters in track." Following his senior year, McCullough was the #1 ranked defensive back in Texas and was selected by the Austin American-Statesman as the sixth best high school football player in Texas. The Dallas Morning News picked McCullough as the state's fifth best football player, and Rivals.com selected him as the #34 player in the country.

== University of Texas ==
He committed to the University of Texas in January 2002. He signed his national letter of intent the following month. As a true freshman in 2002, McCullough appeared in all 13 games for the Longhorns, playing in a reserve role at the nickelback position and as a kickoff returner. He had 19 tackles and an interception in 2002 and shared the Longhorns' Outstanding Defensive Newcomer Award.

In May 2003, at the end of his freshman year, McCullough was one of four Texas football players arrested after marijuana was discovered in their vehicle following a traffic stop. In July 2003, the Madison County District Attorney announced that his office would not pursue marijuana possession charges against the four players.

As a sophomore in 2003, McCullough was required to sit out the football season for academic reasons. At the time of the announcement in July 2003, McCullough told the press, "I have some academic issues I need to take care of in order to return to the team."

== Junior college and Oregon State ==
In 2004, McCullough transferred to City College of San Francisco where he played football at the junior college level. After one year in San Francisco, McCullough was selected as a junior college All-American and a four-star player by JC Gridwire.

In February 2005, McCullough signed a letter of intent with Oregon State University as a junior college transfer student. However, he was unable to play for Oregon State in 2005 for academic reasons.

== Professional football ==
In April 2006, McCullough signed with the Jacksonville Jaguars as a free agent. In early September 2006, McCullough was released as part of the Jaguars final cuts before the start of the 2006 NFL season. In February 2007, McCullough signed with the Frankfurt Galaxy in the NFL Europa. He was selected by the Frankfurt Galaxy in the 2nd round of the 2007 Free Agent Draft, but he never took the field for the Galaxy. In January 2010, McCullough signed with the West Texas Roughnecks of the Indoor Football League.
