= Micheal Clemons =

American football player (born 1997)

Indianapolis Colts
- Position: Defensive end
- Roster status: Injured reserve

Personal information
- Born: August 21, 1997 (age 29); Garland, Texas, U.S.
- Listed height: 6 ft 5 in (1.96 m)
- Listed weight: 263 lb (119 kg)

Career information
- High school: Sachse (Sachse, Texas)
- College: Cisco (2016); Texas A&M (2017–2021)
- NFL draft: 2022: 4th round, 117th overall pick

Career history
- New York Jets (2022–2025); Indianapolis Colts (2026–present)

Career NFL statistics as of 2025
- Total tackles: 119
- Sacks: 8.5
- Forced fumbles: 2
- Pass deflections: 2
- Stats at Pro Football Reference

Micheal Clemons (born August 21, 1997) is an American professional football defensive end for the Indianapolis Colts of the National Football League (NFL). He played college football for the Cisco College Wranglers before transferring to play for the Texas A&M Aggies. He was drafted in 2022 by the New York Jets.

== Early life ==
Clemons grew up in Garland, Texas and attended Sachse High School.

== College career ==
Clemons began his collegiate career at Cisco College. In his lone season with the Wranglers, he recorded 30 tackles, 8.5 tackles for loss, and 2.5 sacks in six games played. After the season, Clemons committed to transfer to Texas A&M.

Clemons played in 13 games in his first season at Texas A&M and had 19 tackles, three tackles for loss, and one sack. He suffered a foot injury during preseason training camp going into his junior season and used a medical redshirt. Clemons played in 11 games with nine starts as a redshirt junior and recorded 28 tackles. He had 14 tackles, 4.5 tackles for a loss, and four sacks before suffering a season ending-injury in the fifth game of his redshirt senior season. Clemons decided to utilize the extra year of eligibility granted to college athletes who played in the 2020 season due to the coronavirus pandemic and return to Texas A&M for a fifth season. He finished his final season with 32 tackles, 11 tackles for loss, and seven sacks. In his final game with the Aggies, Clemons recorded 3.5 sacks against the LSU Tigers.

== Professional career ==
Pre-draft measurables
Height	Weight	Arm length	Hand span	Wingspan	40-yard dash	10-yard split	20-yard split	20-yard shuttle	Three-cone drill	Vertical jump	Broad jump	Bench press
6 ft 5 1/4 in (1.96 m)	263 lb (119 kg)	34 7/8 in (0.89 m)	10 in (0.25 m)	6 ft 11 1/8 in (2.11 m)	4.85 s	1.65 s	2.84 s	4.45 s	7.20 s	35.0 in (0.89 m)	9 ft 8 in (2.95 m)	24 reps
All values from NFL Combine/Pro Day

=== New York Jets ===
Clemons was selected in the fourth round, 117th overall, of the 2022 NFL draft by the New York Jets. The Jets previously obtained the 117th overall selection from the Minnesota Vikings in exchange for Chris Herndon and a 2022 sixth round pick. In Week 8 against the New England Patriots, Clemons recorded his first career sack on quarterback Mac Jones.

In Week 11 of the 2024 season against the Buffalo Bills, Clemons was involved in two separate altercations. The first between himself and Bills player, Dion Dawkins. The second was after the game had concluded in the tunnel to the locker room. In Week 12 against the Miami Dolphins, Clemons was involved in an altercation between Dolphins offensive lineman, Austin Jackson. Both players were disqualified for fighting. Clemons made an illegal elbow against an official that knocked it back, resulting in an automatic disqualification.

=== Indianapolis Colts ===
On March 12, 2026, Clemons signed a three-year, $17.5 million contract with the Indianapolis Colts. On September 22, Clemons was placed on injured reserve due to a toe injury suffered in Week 2 against the Kansas City Chiefs.
