= Joe Walter (American football) =

American football player (born 1963)

No. 63
- Position: Offensive tackle

Personal information
- Born: June 18, 1963 (age 63); Dallas, Texas, U.S.
- Listed height: 6 ft 6 in (1.98 m)
- Listed weight: 290 lb (132 kg)

Career information
- High school: North Garland (Garland, Texas)
- College: Texas Tech
- NFL draft: 1985: 7th round, 181st overall pick

Career history
- Cincinnati Bengals (1985–1997)

Career NFL statistics
- Games played: 166
- Games started: 136
- Fumble recoveries: 5
- Stats at Pro Football Reference

Joseph Follmann Walter (born June 18, 1963) is an American former professional football player who was a tackle for 12 seasons with the Cincinnati Bengals of the National Football League (NFL). He played college football for the Texas Tech Red Raiders and was selected by the Bengals in the seventh round of the 1985 NFL draft with the 181st overall pick.

He lives in Florence, Kentucky, and owns Joe Walter Media Management, which buys media advertising such as radio, TV, newspaper and direct mail.
