= Jacob Lacey =

American gridiron football player (born 1987)

No. 21, 27
- Position: Cornerback

Personal information
- Born: May 28, 1987 (age 39); Columbus, Ohio, U.S.
- Listed height: 5 ft 10 in (1.78 m)
- Listed weight: 177 lb (80 kg)

Career information
- High school: Naaman Forest (Garland, Texas)
- College: Oklahoma State (2005–2008)
- NFL draft: 2009: undrafted

Career history
- Indianapolis Colts (2009−2011); Detroit Lions (2012); Minnesota Vikings (2013); Toronto Argonauts (2015)*
- * Offseason or practice squad member only

Awards and highlights
- PFWA All-Rookie Team (2009); Second-team All-Big 12 (2008)

Career NFL statistics
- Total tackles: 258
- Forced fumbles: 3
- Fumble recoveries: 1
- Pass deflections: 25
- Interceptions: 6
- Defensive touchdowns: 2
- Stats at Pro Football Reference

Jacob Lacey (born May 28, 1987) is an American former professional football player who was a cornerback in the National Football League (NFL). He was signed by the Indianapolis Colts as an undrafted free agent in 2009. He played college football for the Oklahoma State Cowboys.

== Early life ==
Lacey was born on May 28, 1987, in Columbus, Ohio. He is the son of James and Francine Lacey, and has two older brothers, Darryl and James.

Lacey graduated from Naaman Forest High School of Garland Independent School District in Texas, in May 2005. While attending, Lacey played not only football, but varsity basketball, as well. However, in his senior year, he decided to make football his main focus. Starting as the cornerback his sophomore year, Lacey also moved to quarterback to help his team “shake things up”. The star player finished his senior season rushing 1,200 yards, scoring 14 touchdowns, and passing 650 yards. In 2004, he was named first-team all-district and the offensive MVP in District 11-5A. He had offers from Oklahoma State University, Kansas, Colorado, Iowa, and Wisconsin. Jacob took official visits to two Big Ten schools in a matter of only 48 hours. The then senior visited Madison, Wisconsin, on Friday, and departed for Iowa City on Saturday afternoon. However, after four visits to Kansas and a conversation with associate Raimond Pendleton, he decided Kansas was his spot. He later openly admitted that after an official visit to Oklahoma State, he was having some second thoughts.

== College career ==
Lacey attended Oklahoma State University in Stillwater, Oklahoma, as an economics major. In his freshman year, he played in ten games and started against Texas Tech. Lacey finished his freshman year with 14 tackles. Two of his tackles took place during his collegiate debut against Montana State. In his sophomore year, he started all 13 games as cornerback and finished seventh on the team with 48 tackles. While in his junior year, Lacey had three interceptions against Texas in the biggest day of his college career.

== Professional career ==
Pre-draft measurables
Height	Weight	40-yard dash	10-yard split	20-yard split	20-yard shuttle	Three-cone drill	Vertical jump	Broad jump	Bench press
5 ft 9 7/8 in (1.77 m)	177 lb (80 kg)	4.45 s	1.49 s	2.58 s	4.25 s	7.51 s	41.0 in (1.04 m)	9 ft 11 in (3.02 m)	11 reps
All values from Pro Day

=== Indianapolis Colts ===
Lacey was signed by the Indianapolis Colts as an undrafted free agent in 2009 and made the initial 53-man roster. He had his first career interception and first touchdown on the same play. The play was made on Marc Bulger of the St. Louis Rams, and returned it 35 yards for a touchdown. At this time, he also received his first celebration penalty. Lacey was fined $10,000 and penalized 15 yards for sliding into the end zone and making an official’s safe signal. The following day, the cornerback told reporters the celebration was planned for when and if he scored. “If I would have known ahead of time, I probably wouldn’t have done it, but I didn’t know. I’ll try to get into the end zone and spice it up again.” Within one week, the fine was rescinded. Lacey shared the field with former high school teammate Melvin Bullitt. When asked why he signed with the Colts, Lacey answered, “I had a friend that [sic] I played high school football with who was already on the team... He took the same path as me as a free agent. So I knew they would give a free agent a good look, a good shot, a fair chance.” With a couple of Colts injuries early in the season, Lacey was able to start in a few games. Also, later, in week 15 of the 2009-10 season, Lacey intercepted David Garrard, sealing the victory to put the Colts at 14-0.

In 2010, Lacey appeared in 11 games, starting seven. His season highlight was a 44-yard interception return. He suffered an ankle injury mid-season and missed three games. He returned in the week-9 loss to Philadelphia, establishing himself as a starter for the rest of the season.

=== Detroit Lions ===
Lacey signed with the Detroit Lions on March 20, 2012.

=== Minnesota Vikings ===
Lacey signed with the Minnesota Vikings on April 29, 2013. On August 19, 2013, he was released by the Vikings, just a week after having arthroscopic knee surgery. Lacey was later signed again by the team on October 18, 2013, only to be released four days later to make room for new acquisition cornerback Shaun Prater.

=== Toronto Argonauts ===
On April 6, 2015, Lacey signed with the Toronto Argonauts of the Canadian Football League after spending 2014 out of football. He was released by the Argonauts on June 20, 2015.

== NFL career statistics ==
Legend
**Bold**	Career high

=== Regular season ===
Year	Team	Games		Tackles					Interceptions					Fumbles			
Year	Team	GP	GS	Cmb	Solo	Ast	Sck	TFL	Int	Yds	TD	Lng	PD	FF	FR	Yds	TD
2009	IND	**16**	9	**85**	**69**	16	0.0	0	**3**	**53**	**1**	35	**13**	0	0	0	0
2010	IND	12	8	64	51	13	0.0	**3**	1	44	0	**44**	2	0	0	0	0
2011	IND	15	**10**	73	49	**24**	0.0	1	1	32	**1**	32	6	**3**	**1**	**4**	0
2012	DET	11	9	36	30	6	0.0	**3**	1	10	0	10	4	0	0	0	0
		54	36	258	199	59	0.0	7	6	139	2	44	25	3	1	4	0

=== Playoffs ===
Year	Team	Games		Tackles					Interceptions					Fumbles			
Year	Team	GP	GS	Cmb	Solo	Ast	Sck	TFL	Int	Yds	TD	Lng	PD	FF	FR	Yds	TD
2009	IND	**3**	**2**	**14**	**13**	1	0.0	0	0	0	0	0	**2**	0	0	0	0
2010	IND	1	1	9	6	**3**	0.0	0	0	0	0	0	0	0	0	0	0
		4	3	23	19	4	0.0	0	0	0	0	0	2	0	0	0	0
