= Uche Nwaneri =

American football player (1984–2022)

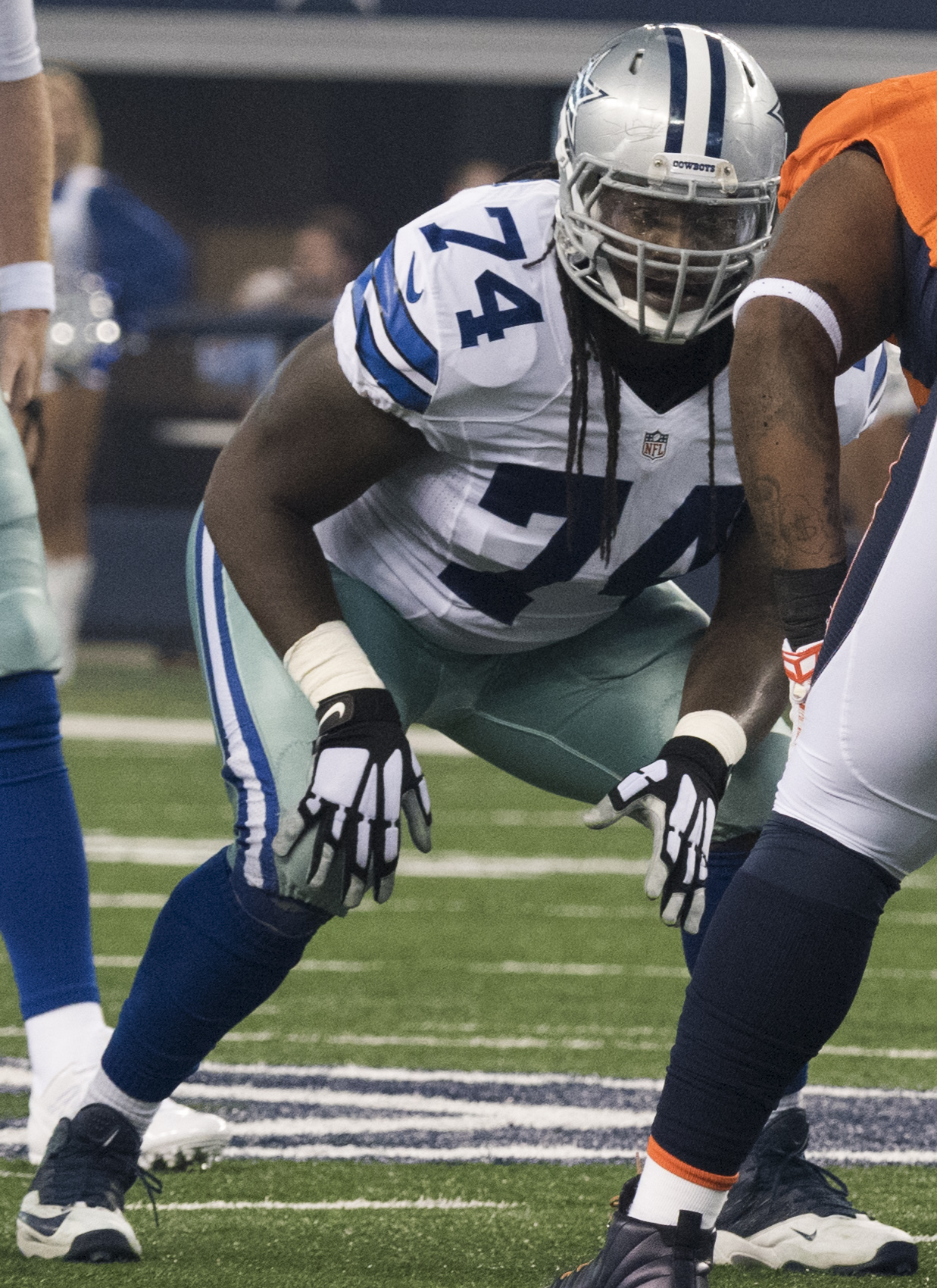
- Nwaneri with the Cowboys during the 2014 NFL preseason

No. 77
- Position: Guard

Personal information
- Born: March 20, 1984; Dallas, Texas, U.S.
- Died: December 30, 2022 (aged 38); West Lafayette, Indiana, U.S.
- Listed height: 6 ft 3 in (1.91 m)
- Listed weight: 310 lb (141 kg)

Career information
- High school: Garland (TX) Naaman Forest
- College: Purdue
- NFL draft: 2007: 5th round, 149th overall pick

Career history
- Jacksonville Jaguars (2007–2013); Dallas Cowboys (2014)*
- * Offseason or practice squad member only

Career NFL statistics
- Games played: 104
- Games started: 92
- Stats at Pro Football Reference

Uchechukwu Eberechukwu Nwaneri (English: /ˈuːtʃeɪ nwɑːˈnɛri/ OO-chay nwah-NERR-ee, Igbo; March 20, 1984 – December 30, 2022) was an American professional football guard who played in the National Football League (NFL) for seven seasons with the Jacksonville Jaguars. He played college football for the Purdue Boilermakers and was selected by the Jaguars in the fifth round of the 2007 NFL draft. After retiring, he ran "The Observant Lineman" channel on YouTube.

== Early life ==
Nwaneri attended Naaman Forest High School in Garland, Texas, where he was teammates with Melvin Bullitt.

College recruiting
Name	Hometown	School	Height	Weight	40^{‡}	Commit date
Uche Nwaneri; OL	Garland, Texas	Naaman Forest High School	6 ft 4 in (1.93 m)	275 lb (125 kg)	5.0	Jul 8, 2003
Uche Nwaneri; OL	Recruit ratings: Scout: Rivals:					
Overall recruit ranking: Scout: -- (OL) Rivals: 66 (OL), -- (TX)
‡ Refers to 40-yard dash; Note: In many cases, Scout, Rivals, 247Sports, On3, and ESPN may conflict in their listings of height, weight and 40 time.; In these cases, the average was taken. ESPN grades are on a 100-point scale.; Sources: "2002 Team Ranking". Rivals.com.

Nwaneri committed to Purdue University on July 8, 2003. Nwaneri also had FBS scholarship offers from Kentucky, and Texas A&M.

== Professional career ==
Pre-draft measurables
Height	Weight	Arm length	Hand span	40-yard dash	10-yard split	20-yard split	Vertical jump	Broad jump	Bench press
6 ft 3 1/8 in (1.91 m)	325 lb (147 kg)	34 1/8 in (0.87 m)	10 in (0.25 m)	5.44 s	1.87 s	3.13 s	27.5 in (0.70 m)	8 ft 1 in (2.46 m)	24 reps
All values from NFL Combine/Pro Day

=== Jacksonville Jaguars ===
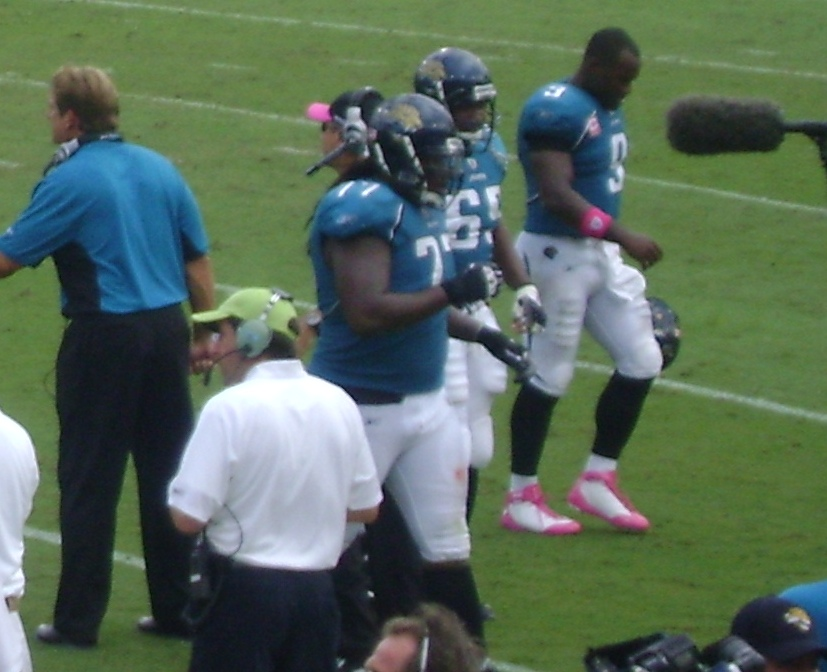
Nwaneri (left, #77) with the Jaguars in 2009

Nwaneri saw limited action as a rookie during the Jaguars' 2007 playoff run, playing in nine games with one start. The next season, he was elevated to starter after an injury to starting guard Vince Manuwai. In all, he appeared in 15 games during the 2008 season, starting 15 of them. He allowed 4.5 sacks during the season.

In 2009, Nwaneri and fellow guard Maurice Williams competed for the starting guard position opposite the returning Vince Manuwai. Nwaneri won the job; Williams was deactivated for much of the season before being released on December 5, 2009. Nwaneri appeared in all 16 games, starting 13 of them. He was only credited with allowing one-half of a sack. Nwaneri was also not penalized during the 2009 season.

Nwaneri's most notable plays occurred in the 2011 season when he made two offensive fumble recoveries in separate games against the Carolina Panthers and the Baltimore Ravens.

Nwaneri was released on March 4, 2014.

=== Dallas Cowboys ===
Nwaneri signed with the Dallas Cowboys on June 25, 2014. He was cut during final roster cuts on August 30, 2014. Following his release, he chose to retire from the NFL.

== Death ==
Nwaneri died on December 30, 2022. Preliminary results indicated a possible heart attack. He was 38.
