= Christian Shearhod =

American influencer and educator

- Born: Texas
- Occupations: Educator, influencer
- Partner: Eden Estrada

Christian Shearhod is an American educator and social media influencer. Previously based in Texas, he now resides in California. He is best known for his social media, which frequently emphasizes LGBTQ+ rights and opposing gender stereotypes.

== Biography ==
Shearhod grew up in Texas. According to him, he attended the University of North Texas, where he studied business administration, while working as a mail carrier in college, and graduated in 2017. He has also stated that he spent a year working as an English teacher in China.

He subsequently became a teacher at the Garland Independent School District. He left the Garland School District following June 2022. During his time at Garland, he has stated that he was put on leave for his thirst traps on social media.

He subsequently moved to Los Angeles, where he continued working as an educator in the county. He went viral in 2023 for a video he created after his son came home upset when his teacher told him that painted nails are only for girls, showing his son getting his nails painted pink. In a follow-up video, he spoke to the day care, requesting that they do not repeat that. He has expressed his dislike of gender norms.

In 2024, he went viral once again after a video of his showing classroom prizes he hands out to students included skincare and makeup in addition to candy and stickers. He received online hate for "confusing" boys, to which he responded by stating that "If boys want to wear makeup, that is okay, and you know what? The boys did want that makeup for... people in their life that they care about."

In 2026, a video of his featured him teaching his students about LGBTQ+ acceptance, and once again went viral. Another video of his in early 2026 included him teaching his students about ICE and instructing them of their rights, telling them "You are a minor. It is not your job to go toe to toe with ICE." and instructing them to ask for a lawyer if they are ever questioned by ICE.

In February 2026, he alleged that he was under investigation by the Texas Education Agency for his social media content. He responded by ripping apart his Texas Education Certification, stating "I don't wanna teach in Texas. Now you have more time to investigate more important things like why Texas is almost last in every aspect of education, except for gun violence... go work on that."

He has described a goal for his content as advocating for LGBTQ+ students. He has also discussed negative comments he has received, including transphobic comments and suicide-baiting.

As of 2026, he had more than 2,700,000 followers. He is engaged to fellow influencer and model Eden Estrada, who is openly transgender. He identifies as straight.
