= Duck Creek, Garland, Texas =

Duck Creek is an area in Garland, Texas, United States that once consisted of two distinct unincorporated communities (sometimes referred to as Old Duck Creek and New Duck Creek) in northeastern Dallas County.

The community began using one, then later two-room log cabins as schools in 1852, with the first multi-grade school, Duck Creek Academy, established in the 1880s. It moved into a permanent red schoolhouse in 1899, and it was later renamed Duck Creek High School. In 1936, Central High School opened; its building was destroyed in 1946 by a fire. A new one story building replaced it.

The area was named after Duck Creek, a tributary of the Trinity River.
