= Beaver Technology Center =

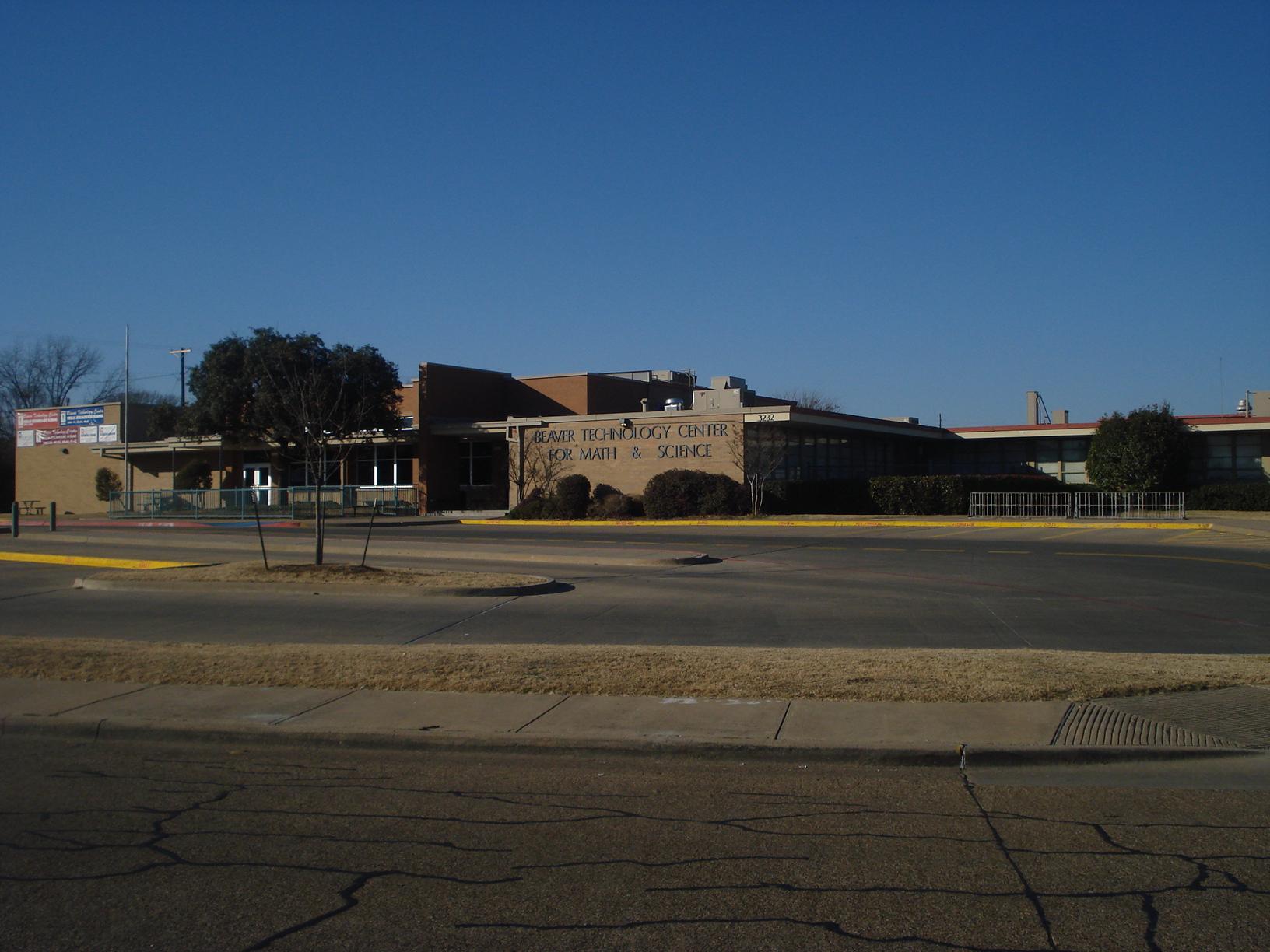

Location
- 3232 March Ln; Garland, Dallas County, Texas 75042-5466; United States; 32°55′17″N 96°40′43″W

Information
- School type: Public elementary school
- School district: Garland ISD
- Superintendent: Ricardo López, Ed.D.
- Principal: Amber Hope
- Staff: 41
- Grades: K–5
- Enrollment: 580 (2010)
  - Kindergarten: 90
  - Grade 1: 90
  - Grade 2: 102
  - Grade 3: 95
  - Grade 4: 104
  - Grade 5: 102
- Language: English
- Hours in school day: 7
- Website: Beaver Technology Center

Beaver Technology Center is a public elementary school in Garland, Texas.

== History ==
Beaver Technology Center, formerly Beaver Elementary, is named after Mrs. Edith Beaver. Mrs. Beaver and her husband, James Beaver, farmed the land where the school stands. Luke Abbett, the first principal of this school opened the doors to Edith Beaver Elementary in 1960 for 279 students and 12 teachers. The teachers did everything: library, music, art, core subjects, and lunch and recess duty for the 30 plus students in their classes. Within five years, Beaver's population swelled to 650 students, eventually maxing out with over 800 students.

== Magnet Program ==
Beaver Technology Center is an elementary magnet school in the Garland Independent School District located in Garland, Texas. Beaver Elementary opened in 1960. In 1997 it reopened as a magnet school for students who have a special interest in math, science and technology, also known as MSTs. Beaver Technology Center is one of two MSTs in Garland, serving students in west Garland, north Garland and Sachse. Watson Technology Center, Beaver's sister school, serves east and south Garland, as well as the community of Rowlett.

In 2009, the school was rated "exemplary" by the Texas Education Agency.

== Statistics (per 2010) ==
The attendance rate for students at the school is 95%, compared with a state average of 96%. 44% of the students at Beaver are economically disadvantaged, 9% enroll in special education, 4% enroll in gifted and talent programs.

The ethnic makeup of the school is 31.8% Hispanic, 25.7% African American, 29.3% White, non-Hispanic, 20.0% Asian/Pacific Islander, and less than 1% Native American.

The average class sizes at Beaver are 21 students per class (with the exception of kindergarten).

Teachers at the school carry, on average, 10 years of teaching experience and 7% of the teachers on staff are first-year teachers.

== Feeder Patterns ==
Garland ISD is a Free Choice school district, which allows the parent to choose which school his or her children want to attend within the district.

== See also ==
- Garland Independent School District
- Garland, Texas
- Magnet School
