= Tyson Ballou =

American model

- Born: Tyson Brett Ballou; November 14, 1976 (age 49); Garland, Texas, U.S.
- Education: North Garland High School, graduated 1995
- Modeling information
- Height: 6 ft 2 in (1.88 m)
- Hair color: Brown
- Eye color: Brown
- Agency: IMG Models (Worldwide); Success Models (Paris); Why Not Model Management (Milan); Sight Management Studio (Barcelona); UNIQUE DENMARK (Copenhagen); PMA (Hamburg)

Tyson Brett Ballou (born November 14, 1976) is an American male model. He has appeared in numerous advertising campaigns and editorials for major fashion brands and publications.

== Career ==
Born in Garland, Texas, Ballou began modeling at the age of 15 years discovered by Page Parkes, appearing in magazines and shows in Texas. Later on, he began modeling in New York City under the Ford Modeling Agency, but later signed with another agency, IMG.
