= Eden Estrada =

Mexican-American model and social media influencer

- Born: July 23, 1995 (age 31); Mazatlán, Sinaloa, Mexico
- Other name: Eden Estrada
- Occupations: Model; TikToker
- Partner: Christian Shearhod
- Modeling information
- Height: 5’8
- Hair color: Blonde
- Eye color: Brown

TikTok information
- Page: edenthedoll
- Followers: 2M
- Last updated: August 27, 2025

Eden Estrada (born July 23, 1995), known professionally as Eden The Doll, is a Mexican-American model and social media influencer. By 2025, she amassed a following of two million on TikTok and garnered large followings on Instagram, YouTube, and OnlyFans. Estrada, who is a transgender woman, documented her gender transition on YouTube. She has been featured in Vogue and is a Playboy model.

== Early life ==
Eden was born in Mazatlán, Mexico on July 23, 1995. Estrada is the first son (who later became transgender woman) of Lilly Barraza and Armando Estrada. She was raised in the Jehovah's Witness faith and described her upbringing as conservative.

== Career ==
Estrada began her career as a runway model. She was featured in Vogue when she was sixteen years old. Estrada modelled for Bellami hair products and walked for Marco Marco. She was featured in music videos for Iggy Azalea and Tokio Hotel.

She works as a social media influencer, with millions of followers across TikTok, Instagram, YouTube, and OnlyFans. Estrada is known professionally as Eden The Doll on social media.

In 2023, she became a model for Playboy. She has also done hair and makeup for other Playboy models during photoshoots.

== Personal life ==
Estrada came out as a transgender woman when she was eighteen years old.

In 2020, YouTuber Jaclyn Hill posted a video accusing Estrada of body shaming her. Estrada made a public apology on her Instagram.

In 2020, Estrada and two of her friends, Jaslene Whiterose and Joslyn Flawless, were assaulted and robbed at Hollywood Boulevard in Los Angeles. They were robbed at knifepoint and threatened with a crowbar. During the attack, transphobic slurs were shouted at Estrada and her friends. She claimed that bystanders also shouted transphobic slurs at the women. The hate crime was investigated by the Los Angeles Police Department. Carlton Callway and Willie Walker were later arrested for the hate crime. A third suspect was identified as Davion Williams. Callway was charged with robbery and Williams was charged with extortion, and both charges carried hate crime enhancement.

Estrada is in a relationship with Christian Shearhod, a high school teacher and social media influencer. They live together in Los Angeles with Shearhod's son.
