= Rose Hill, Garland, Texas =

Area of Garland, Texas, United States

Coordinates: 32°51′11.25″N 96°35′12.86″W

Rose Hill is an area located in southeast Garland, Texas, United States. It was formerly a distinct unincorporated community in Dallas County until annexed by Garland in 1970.

The community was first settled in 1853 and composed of land grants by John Little, W.S. Peques, and J.W. Smith. It was named Rose Hill in 1931 either in honor of early settler P.W. Rose or after roses found at the local churchyard. The population was 117 in 1904 and diminished to 50 by 1910. It had featured a post office (1884–1906) as well as four stores, two churches, a school, a restaurant, a blacksmith, and approximately twenty residences. The population gradually increased to 175 in 1964, the last recorded population number until annexation by Garland six years later.
