= Terrance Bullitt =

American gridiron football player (born 1991)

Profile
- Position: Linebacker

Personal information
- Born: August 5, 1991 (age 35); Garland, Texas, U.S.
- Listed height: 6 ft 2 in (1.88 m)
- Listed weight: 235 lb (107 kg)

Career information
- High school: Garland (TX) Naaman Forest
- College: Texas Tech
- NFL draft: 2014: undrafted

Career history
- Hudson Valley Fort (2015); Edmonton Eskimos (2017); Arizona Hotshots (2019)*
- * Offseason or practice squad member only
- Stats at Pro Football Reference
- Stats at CFL.ca

Terrance Bullitt (born August 5, 1991) is an American former professional football linebacker. Bullitt played at the college level for Texas Tech.

== Early life ==
Bullitt played at the safety position at Naaman Forest High School in Garland, Texas. Bullitt earned All-District 10-5A 1st team honors and was rated a 3-star prospect by Rivals.com coming out of high school.

== College career ==
Bullitt played at the college level for Texas Tech where he redshirted his freshman season in 2009. In his redshirt freshman season in 2010, Bullitt played in all 12 games and finished the season with 23 tackles at the safety position.

In 2011, Bullitt was named a preseason All-Big 12 Conference 2nd Team selection by College Football News. Bullitt started in all 12 games and tallied 56 tackles, 9.5 tackles for loss, and 4 pass breakups. Bullitt's performance garnered All-Big 12 Conference honorable mention honors, as well as a 2nd Team selection from the Dallas Morning News. Throughout the season, Bullitt was battling a nagging shoulder injury that required surgery during the offseason.

Bullitt's junior season in 2012 saw him in action in 10 games with 7 starts before sidelined for the final three games by another shoulder injury. Bullitt would tally 19 tackles, 2 tackles for loss, and one sack.

During his senior season in 2013, Bullitt would play in all 13 games with 12 starts at the linebacker position. He would tally 37 tackles, 3 tackles for loss, two sacks, 9 pass breakups and two recovered fumbles.

== Professional career ==
Pre-draft measurables
Height	Weight	40-yard dash	20-yard shuttle	Three-cone drill	Vertical jump	Broad jump	Bench press
6 ft 2 in (1.88 m)	226 lb (103 kg)	4.68 s	4.03 s	6.77 s	40 in (1.02 m)	10 ft 3 in (3.12 m)	14 reps
All values from Texas Tech Pro Day

Bullitt would go undrafted in the 2014 NFL draft before being signed as a free agent to the Baltimore Ravens.

In 2018, he signed with the Arizona Hotshots of the AAF for the 2019 season, but was waived during final roster cuts on January 30, 2019.
