= Centerville, Garland, Texas =

Area of Garland, Texas, United States

Coordinates: 32°52′43.47″N 96°37′17.21″W

Centerville is an area in Garland, Texas, United States; it used to be a distinct unincorporated community in Dallas County.
