= Sachse High School =

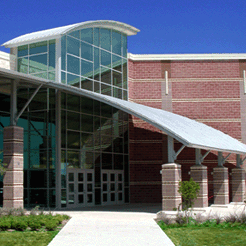

Location
- 3901 Miles Road; Sachse, Dallas/Collin County, Texas 75048-4621; United States; 32°57′39″N 96°35′00″W

Information
- School type: Public high school
- Opened: 2002
- School district: Garland Independent School District
- Superintendent: Ricardo (Rick) López
- CEEB code: 446082
- Principal: Alice Wong
- Teaching staff: 169.65 (on an FTE basis)
- Grades: 9–12
- Age range: 14–19
- Enrollment: 2,935 (2024–2025)
- Average class size: 24 English; 24 foreign language 25 math 23 science 27 social studies
- Student to teacher ratio: 17.30
- Language: English
- Hours in school day: 8
- Colors: Blue, orange and white
- Fight song: On Wisconsin/William Tell
- Athletics: UIL 6A
- Sports: Football, Basketball, Track, Tennis, Baseball, Softball, Volleyball, Golf, Cross Country, Soccer
- Mascot: Mustang
- Team name: Mustangs
- Newspaper: The Stampede
- Yearbook: The Gait
- Website: www.garlandisdschools.net/shs

Sachse High School is a public high school located in Sachse, Texas, United States. Sachse High School enrolls students in grades 9–12 and is a part of the Garland Independent School District. The first graduating class was the charter class of 2005.

In 2009, the school was rated "recognized" by the Texas Education Agency.

== Statistics (per 2009) ==
The attendance rate for students at the school is 96%, equal to the state average of 96%. 25% of the students at Sachse are economically disadvantaged, 10% enroll in special education, 6% enroll in gifted and talent programs, 39% are enrolled in career and technology programs, and 7% are considered "limited English proficient."

The ethnic makeup of the school is 50% White, non-Hispanic, 27% Hispanic, 16% African American, 7% Asian/Pacific Islander, and less than 1% Native American.

The average class sizes at Sachse are 24 students for English, 24 for foreign language, 25 for math, 23 for science, and 27 for social studies.

Teachers at the school carry, on average, 9 years of teaching experience and 6% of the teachers on staff are first-year teachers.

In 2011 Sachse High School made it to the state playoffs for football for the first time in the school's history.

== Feeder patterns ==
Garland ISD is a Free Choice school district, which allows the parent to choose which school his or her children want to attend within the district. Sachse High School is 1 of 8 high schools in the Garland Independent School District.

== Sports ==
Sachse High School competes in the following sports: baseball, basketball, cross country, football, golf, soccer, softball, tennis, track, cheerleading, volleyball and swimming/diving.

== Fine Arts ==
Sachse High school has a fine arts program with Band, Choir, and Theater

== Extracurricular ==
Two Sachse High School students won the 2014 HOSA National Championship for Community Emergency Response Team (CERT)Skills.

== Notable alumni ==
- Micheal Clemons - Football player for the New York Jets.
- Devin Duvernay - Football player for the Baltimore Ravens. 2x NFL Special Teams Pro Bowler
- Cyera Hintzen - Soccer player for Dallas Trinity FC
- Tyler Lacy - Football player for the Detroit Lions.
- Kaliq Lockett - Football player for the Texas Longhorns.
- Jared Mayden - DB Football player for the San Francisco 49ers and the Buffalo Bills.
- Alex Orji - Football player for the Michigan Wolverines and the UNLV Rebels.
- Devine Ozigbo - Football player for the Detroit Lions, the New Orleans Saints, the Jacksonville Jaguars and the Denver Broncos.

== See also ==
- Garland Independent School District
- Garland, Texas
- List of high schools in Texas
