= Garland High School =

High school in Garland, Texas

Location
- 310 South Garland Avenue; Garland, Dallas County, Texas 75040-6151; 32°54′36″N 96°38′49″W

Information
- School type: Public high school
- Motto: Enter to Learn, Go Forth to Serve
- School district: Garland Independent School District
- Superintendent: Dr. Ricardo López
- Principal: Tyrance “Duke” Barnett
- Staff: 151.33 (FTE)
- Grades: 9-12
- Enrollment: 2,481 (2023-2024)
- Student to teacher ratio: 16.39
- Colors: Black & Gold
- Athletics conference: UIL 6A
- Mascot: Owl
- Website: www.garlandisdschools.net/ghs

Garland High School is a high school located in Garland, Texas, which serves grades 9-12. It is a part of the Garland Independent School District. The school is a member of the AP program, the IB program, and is known for its football team, the Garland Owls.

In 2015, the school was rated "Met Standard" by the Texas Education Agency.

== History ==
Garland High School was founded in 1902, and was established in the former Garland College. Around 1912 the building was expanded and renovated.

It is the oldest of the district's high schools, having celebrated its 100-year anniversary in the 2001–2002 school year. The school celebrated its 70th anniversary at the current location (referring to the current building) in the 2006–2007 school year. Garland High School is also the Arts Magnet for the District with its Performing Arts Endorsement Program, and also renowned for its International Baccalaureate program.

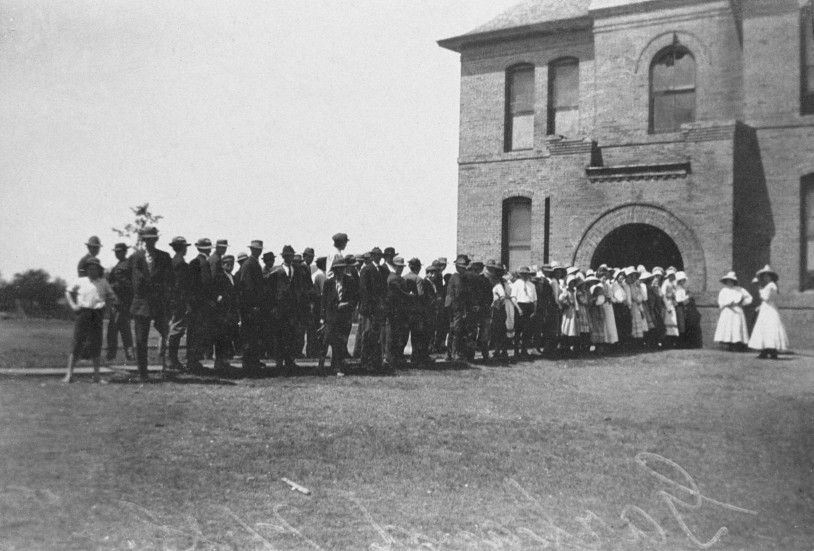
Garland High School began classes in the 1902–1903 academic year. Operating in the old Garland College building on the west side of 9th Street between Avenues A & B, the faculty offered primary, intermediate, high school and college-level instruction. Civic convocations were held in the auditorium, which accommodated crowds like the one shown here ca. 1912.

The film WUSS was shot at Garland High, as well as the 2016 LGBT-Comedy film “Hurricane Bianca”, starring drag queen Bianca Del Rio.

== Campus ==
As of 2014, certain agricultural and athletic programs are held off-campus since there is insufficient space to house them. The current GHS campus was built in 17 distinct pieces.

== Academic programs ==
The school attracts many students from around the city because of its variety of rigorous academic programs such as the IB program and long history.

=== International Baccalaureate ===
The IB Program is a two-year educational program available to eleventh and twelfth grade students attending Garland High School. This program, following standard IB policies, requires a schedule of six academic subjects both years (English, history, language, math, science, and the additional sixth subject) as well as a Theory of Knowledge class junior year.

Other programs that can be taken alone (meaning the student is not an IB student) but count as IB classes are IB Art and IB Theatre.

- IB Art - Students study art and design and are evaluated towards their final years on the merits of their Investigation Workbooks or art portfolio. This is followed by an art show and allows for students to independently evaluate themselves during the process.

=== School of Performing Arts ===
(As of the 2018-19 school year, the Performing Arts Endorsement (PAE) has changed into the Academy of Visual and Performing Arts (AVAPA) program.)

The School of Performing Arts was approved by the GISD School Board. Graduates of the School of Performing Arts receive the Performing Arts Endorsement, sequence of courses designed for the artistically gifted/talented student and offers the opportunity to concentrate on the Performing Arts and gain proficiency in chosen areas of concentration during the high school years, much as a Music or Theatre Major does in college.

Upon completion of the prescribed course of study, a Performing Arts Endorsement (PAE) shall be awarded to the student. This endorsement will accompany their official transcript, along with an explanation of the endorsement and its criteria, and will become applicable to university study or future professional endeavors. The Performing Arts Endorsement has been reviewed by both university and secondary administration. It has received praise for both its inclusiveness and its practicality.

The School of Performing Arts was replaced in 2018 by the Academy of Visual and Performing Arts program. This program expands upon endorsements and allows visual arts to also receive credit, as the Performing Arts Endorsement only applied to performance arts, including film.

==== Performing Arts Endorsement Types ====
- Instrumental - Band
- Instrumental - Orchestra
- Vocal Music
- Piano Performance
- Theatre Arts - Performance
- Theatre Arts- Technical
- Classical Guitar
- Film

Note that IB Theatre and PAE are two different things but may also be done concurrently.

== Athletics ==
Garland High School has one of the most profound legacies of any school in its district, with its football team having won several state championships during its lifetime. In addition to football, Garland High School offers baseball, basketball, cross country, Dashing Debs (also known as the Drill Team), golf, gymnastics, marching band, soccer, softball, swimming, tennis, track, and volleyball. Garland was part of the UIL Class 5A for the 2013–2014 school year, but has been reclassified under UIL Class 6A Region 2 District 11 for the 2014–2015 school year and beyond.

== Notable alumni ==
- Hakeem Adeniji, offensive lineman for the Cincinnati Bengals of the National Football League (NFL)
- Mookie Blaylock, Former NBA point guard for the New Jersey Nets, Atlanta Hawks, and Golden State Warriors, attended Oklahoma
- Johnny Yong Bosch, voice actor
- Donny Cates, comic book writer, artist, and podcaster
- Bobby Boyd, 5 time All-Pro NFL defensive back for the Baltimore Colts and member of the all-decade team during the 1960s, attended Oklahoma
- Ike Diogu, Power forward/center for the Guangdong Southern Tigers, attended Arizona State and was 2 time Pac-10 player of the year
- Chuck Dicus, NFL wide receiver for the San Diego Chargers in the late 1960s and early 1970s and member of College Football Hall of Fame, attended Arkansas
- Joe Driver (Class of 1964), former member of the Texas House of Representatives
- Mike Gandy, Arizona Cardinals offensive lineman, played in Super Bowl XLIII, also played for the Chicago Bears and Buffalo Bills, attended Notre Dame
- Jordan Hudson, NFL wide receiver for the Dallas Cowboys
- Luther Kirk, NFL player
- David Koresh, leader of the Branch Davidians (see Waco Siege) (did not graduate)
- Randy Love, Former NFL running back for the St. Louis Cardinals from 1979–1985, attended University of Houston
- Richmond McGee, NFL player
- Uzooma Okeke, Award-winning CFL offensive lineman, attended SMU
- Adrian Phillips, NFL player
- Ricky Pierce, Former 2 time NBA 6th man of the year, attended Rice
- Seth Russell, former college football quarterback for the Baylor Bears
- Casey Walker, NFL player
- Herkie Walls, NFL, European, Arena League running back, attended Texas
- Karl Williams, NFL, AFL, 9-year veteran for the Tampa Bay Buccaneers and the Arizona Cardinals from 1996–2004. Also played in the Arena Football League for the Tampa Bay Storm, attended Texas A&I (now known as Texas A&M Kingsville).
- Lawrence B. Jones, Fox News Channel
- Wes Smith, NFL, CFL Drafted by the St. Louis Cardinals in 1986 NFL Draft. Played for the St. Louis Cardinals in 1986 and The Green Bay Packers in 1987. Attended East Texas State University (now known as Texas A&M Commerce).
- Mike Morath, Current Texas Education Agency commissioner since 2017 under Gov. Greg Abbott
