= South Garland High School =

Location
- 600 Colonel Drive; Garland, Dallas County, Texas 75043-2302; 32°52′18″N 96°37′06″W

Information
- School type: Public High school
- Motto: "A Tradition in Excellence"
- Established: 1964
- School district: Garland Independent School District
- Superintendent: Ricardo Lopez
- Principal: Jennifer Garcia
- Staff: 134.36 (FTE)
- Grades: 9–12
- Enrollment: 1,979 (2023-2024)
- Student to teacher ratio: 14.73
- Language: English
- Colors: Blue and red
- Mascot: Titans
- Website: www.garlandisdschools.net/sghs

South Garland High School (SGHS) is a secondary school located in Garland, Texas. The school is part of the Garland Independent School District. The mascot for SGHS is the Titan, after retiring the Colonel, and the school colors are red and Columbia blue. The top right “square” on their shield used to be the confederate flag later being replaced by the swords. In 2009, the school was rated "academically acceptable" by the Texas Education Agency.

== History ==
South Garland High School opened in 1964. It was the second public high school to open in Garland.

== Academics ==
South Garland High School offers a variety of Advanced Placement and Dual Credit courses that allow them to enroll in freshmen courses and earn college credits at a local institution of higher education. These classes include:

- Biology
- Calculus AB
- Chemistry
- Computer Science A
- Principles of Computer Science
- English Language and Composition
- English Literature and Composition
- Government and Politics: United States
- Human Geography
- Macroeconomics
- Physics 1
- Spanish Language
- Spanish Literature
- Psychology
- Statistics
- United States History
- World History
- Art History

== Dual credit ==
South Garland High School has a dual credit program:

- English Language,
- English Lit,
- Pre-Calculus On Ramps,
- Biology AP,
- Electronics I,
- Electronics II,
- Auto Tech,
- Fashion Marketing,
- Advertising,
- BCIM,
- Accounting,
- FTI I,
- FTI II

During the 2019–2020 school year, the school decided to partner with Eastfield College to offer Early College High School to approximately 150 students each school year, allowing them to graduate with an associate degree and up to 60 college credits while in high school at no cost.

=== Controversy ===
In 1991 a black activist named Melvin "A'Vant" Thomas picketed the school as it’s previous coat of arms contained a flag resembling the battle flag of the Confederate States of America; for a period of almost two years he had written numerous letters to the GISD school board asking them to remove the mural.

During this period, a group of students voted against changing the school flag in August 1988, which A'Vant protested. He later ended his protests in April 1991 after a group of South Garland High School parents developed a multiracial committee to discuss the symbols and traditions they considered offensive that continued to be used by the school, including its fight song. The group met about 12 times before making a proposal to the school board in the summer of 1991. The group reached a compromise with the board members on only two items.

The Garland independent school Board voted 6 to 1 at its August 1, 1991, meeting, to discontinue use of the altered Confederate flag as the school flag and to also change the color of the mascot's uniform from gray to blue and red. The sole dissenting vote was cast by Randy Clark, who maintained that he was voting as his constituents had advised him. The president of the local chapter of the NAACP said the issue would not be over unless all symbolism referring to the Confederacy, including the fight song and a plantation mural, were removed.

At the start of the 1991–92 school year, a contest was held to replace the flag. The crossed sword design was chosen by the student body to replace the rebel flag.

The sign outside South Garland High School was later changed to reflect the changes in the school flag and mascot.

In 2015 the GISD school board agreed to remove symbolism reminiscent of the Confederacy.

In 2020, the Garland ISD Board of Trustees unanimously voted to retire the Colonel mascot in favor of a new one following the approval of a $1.6 million rebrand. Ultimately, the Board chose Titans as the replacement name.

== Sports ==
South Garland High School has had a strong history of sports, especially in its football team. South offers the following sports to its students: Baseball, Basketball, Football, Golf, Gymnastics, Power Lifting, Soccer, Softball, Tennis, Track/Cross Country, and Volleyball. South belongs to the UIL Class 5A for the 2013–2014 school year, and will be put into UIL Class 5A Region 2 District 12 for the 2014–2015 school year, the only school in the Garland Independent School District to not be moved into UIL Class 6A for the 2014–2015 school year, moving back up to UIL Class 6A only two years later. South currently belongs in UIL Class 6A for the 2019–2020 school year.

South Garland has been in the state football playoffs 16 times, in 1970, 1973, 1990, 1991, 1996, 1997, 2003, 2004, 2005, 2006, 2007, 2008, 2009, 2010 and 2012. The team made it to the playoffs for an eighth consecutive year in 2010. Among the notable athletes who are South Garland alumni is Jerry Sanders.

The Lady Titans Varsity Volleyball team were in the Playoffs back in 2001–2003 and 2009.

The Boys Varsity Basketball team made the playoffs the last 3 years (2017-2019) and advanced to the 2018 UIL State Semi-Finals under Coach Parker.

The Boys Soccer Team made the playoffs the last 4 years (2011–2012) under Coach Bueno and (2012–2015) under Coach Falloure.

Lisa McCorstin, who excelled in track in the 1970s, was inducted into the district's sports hall of fame.

== Extracurricular activities ==
•Band •Choir •Theatre •Drill Team (Varsity: Royal Legacies, Non-Varsity: Sapphires) •Art •Cheerleading •E-Sports Gaming League

== Signature programs ==
Cosmetology, Welding, Autobody Collision Repair and Auto Technology

== Notable alumni ==
- Mike Hambrick (1967) – Television and radio news anchor, reporter and correspondent
- Gary Nicholson (singer) (1968) – Grammy-winning country singer-songwriter and record producer
- Ron Woodroof (1968) – Formed underground Dallas Buyers Club for importing desperately needed AIDS medications; a motion picture depicting his efforts was released in 2013
- Alfreda Bikowsky (1983) – Embattled Central Intelligence Agency officer who headed the Bin Laden Issue Station and reportedly tied to torture activities
- Denard Walker (1991) – Cornerback for Tennessee Titans, Denver Broncos, Minnesota Vikings and Oakland Raiders
- Quincy Morgan (1996) – Wide receiver for the Blinn College, Kansas State Wildcats football, Denver Broncos, Dallas Cowboys, Cleveland Browns and Pittsburgh Steelers
- Erin McCarley (1997) – Published alternative music singer-songwriter, based in Nashville, Tennessee
- Jason Thompson (2000) – College and professional soccer player for Eastern Illinois University, D.C. United and the Dallas Burn, and a member of the US Men's National Soccer Team pool
- Jeremy Barnes (2005) – Former professional baseball player and current hitting coach for the New York Mets
- Terrel Harris (2005) – Shooting guard for the Miami Heat
- Nick Florence (2007) - Quarterback for the Baylor University football team, 2009-2012
- Naser Jason Abdo (2008) – Former United States Army Private First Class, went AWOL and was convicted of attempted use of a weapon of mass destruction, currently serving a life sentence at supermax facility ADX Florence
- Tyrese Maxey (2019) - Guard for Kentucky and for the Philadelphia 76ers.
- Mac Percival (faculty) – NFL placekicker for the Chicago Bears and Dallas Cowboys, 1967–74. Faculty member 1965–67

== See also ==
- List of high schools in Texas
