= Garland Independent School District =

School district in Texas, United States

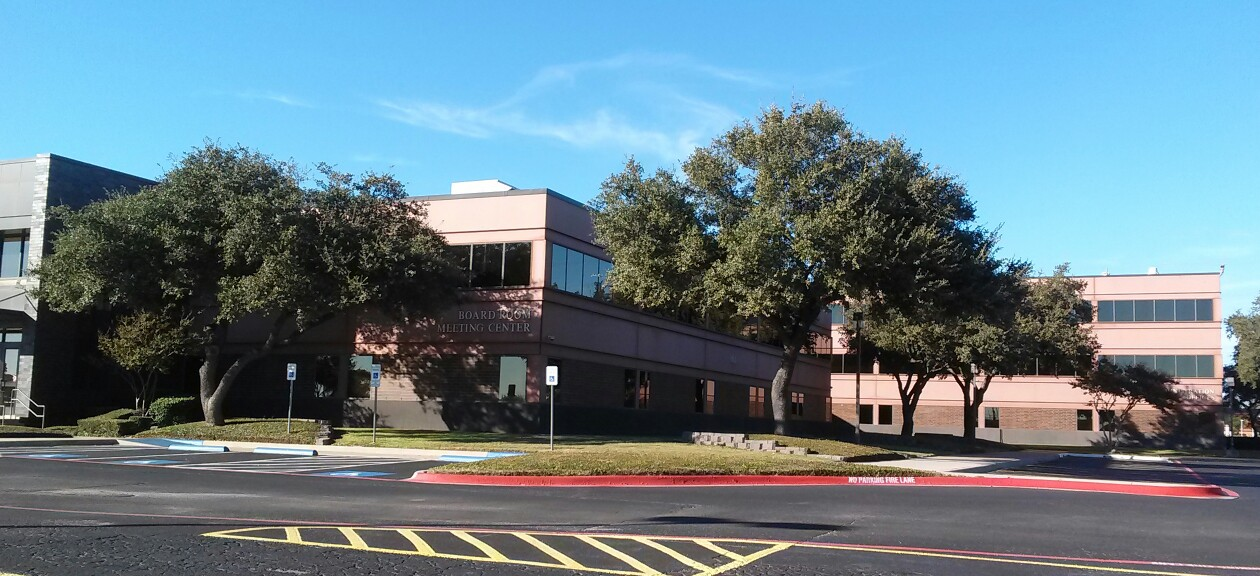
- Garland Independent School District Headquarters

Address
- 501 South Jupiter Drive Garland, Texas; United States
- Coordinates: 32°55′33.9″N 96°38′19.7″W

District information
- Type: Public
- Grades: Pre-K through 12
- Superintendent: Dr. Ricardo Lopéz
- Budget

Students and staff
- Students: 52,355
- Teachers: 3,773
- Staff: 3,334
- Athletic conference: UIL 10-6A

Other information
- Website: www.garlandisd.net

Garland Independent School District (GISD) is a public school district with its headquarters in the Harris Hill Administration Building in Garland, Texas, United States. Garland ISD extends from the Dallas city limits, northeast to the county line and serves parts of the communities of Garland, Rowlett, and Sachse. Small portions of Dallas and Wylie are served by Garland ISD.

The district encompasses approximately 100 square miles (260 km^{2}). With a student enrollment of 56,459 students, GISD is currently the fourth largest school district in the Dallas-Fort Worth Metroplex, and is thirteenth largest district in the state of Texas. Garland High School, the district's first high school, is more than one hundred years old.

In 2009, the school district was rated "academically acceptable" by the Texas Education Agency.

== Choice of School Plan ==
Garland ISD implements a Freedom of Choice/Choice of School plan, which allows parents to choose which school his/her children want to attend within the district for the following school year. The Choice of School plan is a desegregation plan resulting from the Civil Rights Act of 1964. The plan stipulates that all schools must adhere to the ethnicity ratios established by the courts while not exceeding the student capacities of each individual campus. Most students choose to attend the school to which they would be assigned absent Free Choice; preference is given to students residing closest to the school facility. Garland ISD schools have defined "transportation areas" that provide school bus transportation to students who live two or more miles from the nearest available school. Garland ISD has the only "free choice system" in the Dallas/Fort Worth Metroplex and in the United States of America.

The change in demographics, with GISD's student body becoming about 50% Hispanic and Latino by 2013, interfered with the ethnicity bands set in the 1980s.

== Statistics ==
In 2016 the attendance rate for students in the district was 96%, compared with a state average of 96%. 48% of the students in the district were economically disadvantaged, 10% enroll in special education, 7% enroll in gifted and talent programs, 22% are enrolled in career and technology programs, and 24% are considered "limited English proficient."

In 2006 the ethnic makeup of the district was 40.7% Hispanic, 32.5% White, non-Hispanic, 18.7% African American, 7.6% Asian/Pacific Islander, and 0.5% Native American. As of 2015 the district had over 2,000 students of Vietnamese heritage. GISD operates Spanish and Vietnamese bilingual programs, the latter only being available at grades PK-3 at 10 elementary schools and Parsons PreK.

In 1997, over 50% of the students were non-Hispanic white. In 2000 27% of the students were Hispanic or Latino, but this increased to 37% by 2005. From 1997 to 2016 the number of non-Hispanic white students had declined by 65%.

From 1997 to 2016 the number of students on free or reduced lunches, a way of classifying a student as low income, increased by 160%.

In 2006 Teachers in the district carry, on average, 10 years of teaching experience and 12% of the teachers on staff are first-year teachers. 74% of the teachers hold bachelors, 24% hold master's, 1% hold doctorates, and less than 1% have no degree.

60% of students in the district took SAT/ACT standardized examinations with an average score of 1009 and 20, respectively. 23% of students took an AP and/or IB examination.

== Facilities ==
=== Secondary schools ===
==== High schools ====
5 in Garland, 1 in Rowlett, 1 in Sachse

- Garland High School (Garland) (opened 1864 as "Garland School;" evolved into Garland High in 1902)
- Lakeview Centennial High School (Garland) (opened 1976)
- Naaman Forest High School (Garland) (opened 1988 as a junior highschool; evolved into a senior highschool in 1992)
- North Garland High School (Garland) (opened 1971)
- Rowlett High School (Rowlett) (opened 1996)
- Sachse High School (Sachse) (opened 2002)
- South Garland High School (Garland) (opened 1964)

Other

- Garland ISD Evening School (on the campus of Garland High School, Garland)
- Gilbreath-Reed Career Technical Center (Garland) (opened 2017)

==== Middle schools ====
9 in Garland, 2 in Rowlett, 1 in Sachse

- Austin Academy for Excellence (Garland)
  - 1992-93 National Blue Ribbon School
  - 2016-17 National Blue Ribbon School
- Bussey Middle School (Garland)
- Classical Center at Brandenburg Middle School (Garland) (opened 1972)
  - 2009 National Blue Ribbon School
- Coyle Middle School (Rowlett) (opened 1973)
- Sam Houston Middle School (Garland)
- Hudson Middle School (Sachse) (opened 1992)
- Jackson Technology Center (Garland)
- Lyles Middle School (Garland)
  - 1992-93 National Blue Ribbon School
- O'Banion Middle School (Garland)
- Schrade Middle School (Rowlett)
- Sellers Middle School (Garland)
- Webb Middle School (Garland)

=== Primary schools ===
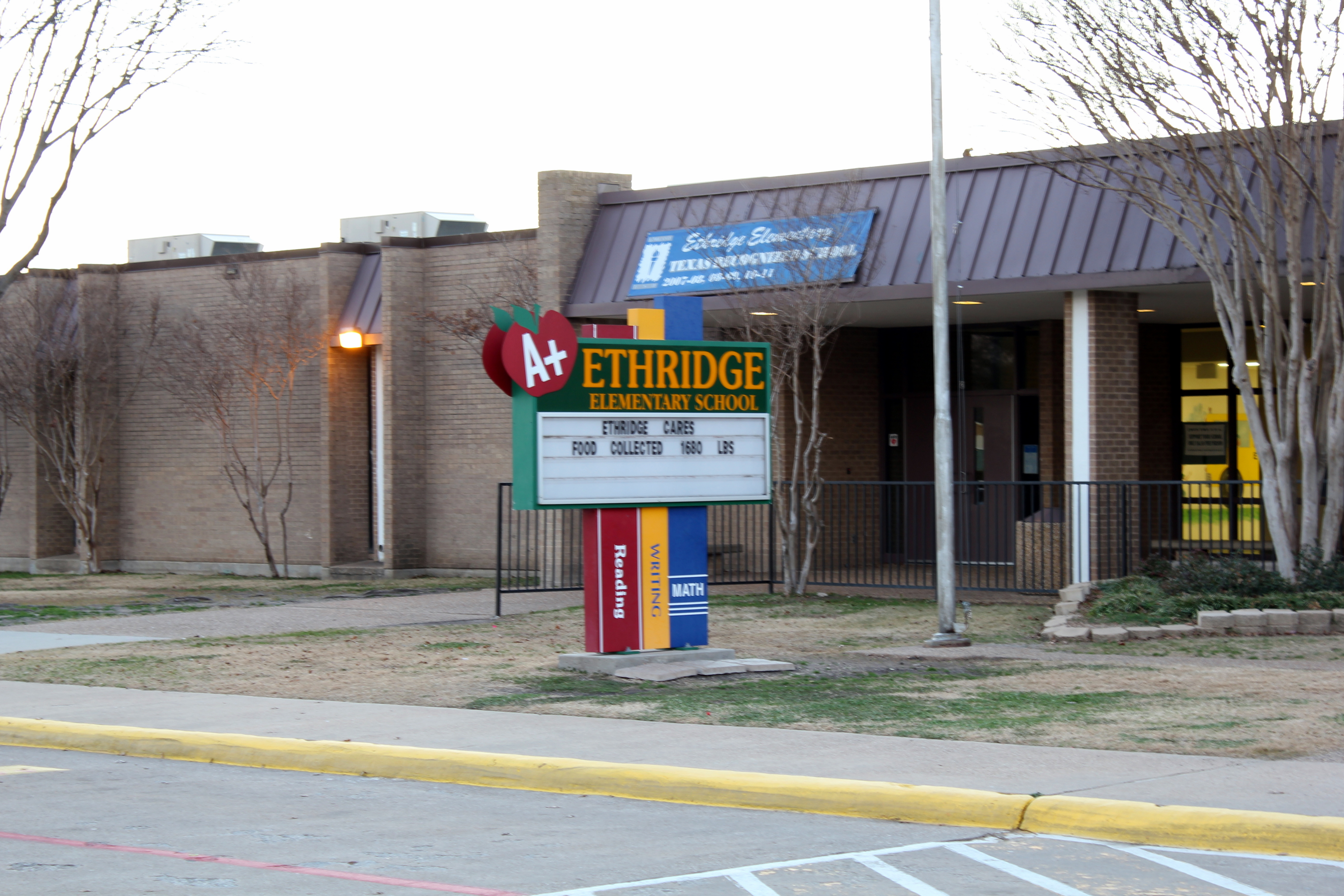
Ethridge Elementary School

36 in Garland, 9 in Rowlett, 2 in Sachse

- Luke & Betty Abbett Elementary School (Garland) (opened 1989)
- Armstrong Elementary School (Sachse) (opened August 19, 2002)
- James M. Back Elementary School (Rowlett)
- Beaver Technology Center (Garland)(opened in 1960, became a magnet in 1997)
- Bradfield Elementary School (Garland)
- Bullock Elementary School (Garland) (opened 1962)
- Randolph Caldwell Elementary School (Garland) (opened 1955)
- George Washington Carver Elementary School (Garland) (opened 2007)
- Classical Center at Vial Elementary School (Garland) (opened 1974)
- Club Hill STEM Elementary School (Garland) (opened 1974)
- Cooper Elementary School (Garland) (opened 1963)
- Couch Collegiate Prep (Garland)
- Daugherty Elementary School (Garland)
  - The original capacity was 800, and for generations that was adequate for its enrollment. By 2006 it was overcrowded with 1,300 students.
- Davis Elementary School (Garland)
- Dorsey Elementary School (Rowlett) (opened August 12, 1996)
- Ethridge Elementary School (Garland)
- Freeman Elementary School (Garland)
- Joyce Giddens-Steadham Elementary School (Rowlett) (opened August 9, 1999)
- Golden Meadows Elementary School (Garland)
- Handley STEM Elementary School (Garland) (opened 1964)
- Heather Glen Montclair Elementary School (Garland)
- Carl L. Herfurth Elementary School (Rowlett) (opened 1988)
- Hickman Elementary School (Garland) (opened 1975)
- Hillside Academy for Excellence (Garland)
  - 2016-17 National Blue Ribbon School
- Keeley Elementary School (Rowlett) (opened August 1991)
- Kimberlin Academy for Excellence (Garland)
  - 1991-92, 1998–99, 2015-16 National Blue Ribbon School
- Liberty Grove Elementary School (Rowlett) (opened 2007)
- Lister Elementary School (Garland)
- Luna Elementary School (Garland)
- Northlake Elementary School (Garland)
- Nita Pearson Elementary School (Rowlett) (opened 2004)
- Routh Roach Elementary School (Garland)
  - By 2006 Roach received an addition due to increasing student enrollment.
  - 2006-07, 2014-15 National Blue Ribbon School
- Rowlett Elementary School (Rowlett) (opened 1979)
- Sewell Elementary School (Sachse) (opened 1992)
- Shorehaven Elementary School (Garland)
- Shugart Elementary School (Garland)
- Southgate STEM Elementary School (Garland)
- Spring Creek Elementary School (Garland) (opened August 1981)
- Stephens Elementary School (Rowlett) (opened August 15, 1994)
- Toler Elementary School (Garland) (1976)
- Walnut Glen Academy for Excellence (Garland) (opened 1988)
  - 1996-97, 2007–08, 2014-15 National Blue Ribbon School
- Watson Technology Center (Garland) (opened in 1956, became a magnet in 1997)
- Weaver Elementary School (Garland)
- Williams Elementary School (Garland)

=== Pre-Kindergarten schools ===
2 in Garland

- Gloria Cisneros PreKindergarten School
- Florence Parsons Prekindergarten School

=== Rentable facilities ===
Curtis Culwell Center is a $31.5 million multi-purpose rentable facility featuring an arena and a conference center. The complex was built by HKS, Inc. and funded by a bond election held in fall of 2002. Although the facility replaced Southern Methodist University's Moody Coliseum as Garland ISD's primary location to host the district's commencement exercises in May 2005, the 190,000-square-foot (18,000 m^{2}) complex was formally completed in August 2005.

The arena seats up to 7,500 for concerts, basketball/volleyball games, and graduation ceremonies. The conference center seats 400 guests in the 8,000 square feet (740 m^{2}) ballroom for banquets and 140 guests in the tiered lecture hall.

== Former schools ==
- George Washington Carver School - A segregated all African American school named after the African American scientist that was officially closed December 31, 1970, when Garland ISD desegregated. The district opened an elementary school with the same name in 2007.
- Centerville Elementary School - closed at the end of 2024-2025 school year
- Golden Meadows Elementary School - it consolidated with Freeman Elementary at the start of the 2024-2025 school year, and as of 2026, currently holds the students and faculty from Hillside.
- Montclair Elementary School - it consolidated with Heather Glen Elementary
- Park Crest Elementary School - Williams Elementary consolidated with the school and that campus became Williams Elementary

== Controversies / Incidents ==
=== Black History Month, 2016 ===
On February 26, 2016 during a presentation at Coyle Middle School, students held up signs saying, “Black Lives Matter,” “I Can’t Breathe,” and “The Whole System Is Guilty.” In response, the Rowlett police chief Mike Broadnax said “Allowing this only promotes the discontent and hatred for police to continue. It’s a bad day.” In response, Coyle Middle School principal Michael Bland emailed school staff stating, "...If any of the political messages on the signs offended anyone, I apologize on behalf of the administration.".

=== Curtis Culwell Center incident ===
There was a "contest to draw cartoons of the Prophet Muhammad" that resulted in an attack by two Muslim men who were shot dead by Garland Police.

=== Christian Shearhod ===
Social media influencer and teacher Christian Shearhod, known for his LGBTQ+ advocacy and opposition to gender stereotypes, worked at Garland until June 2022. After being contacted regarding his social media, Garland put out a statement in January 2026 stating that he was no longer affiliated with the district and had not been since 2022.
