= Garland, Texas =

- City
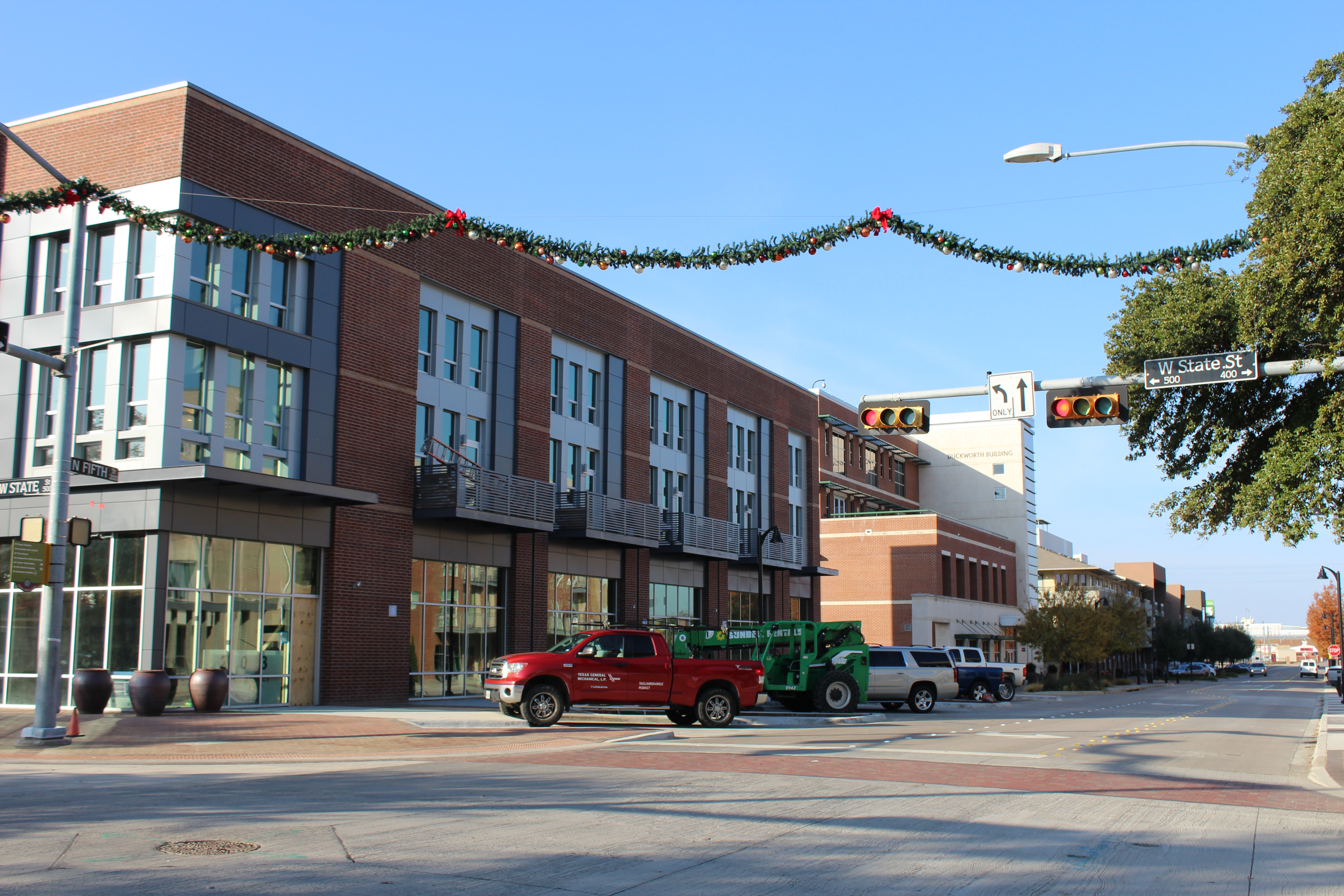
- Downtown

- Motto: Texas Made Here
- Location within Dallas County

- Location within Texas Location within the United States
- Coordinates: 32°54′26″N 96°38′7″W
- Country: United States
- State: Texas
- County: Dallas, Collin, Rockwall
- Incorporated: 1891

Government
  - Type: Council-manager
  - Mayor: Dylan Hedrick

Area
  - Total: 57.26 sq mi (148.29 km^{2})
  - Land: 57.13 sq mi (147.97 km^{2})
  - Water: 0.12 sq mi (0.31 km^{2})
- Elevation: 551 ft (168 m)

Population (2020)
  - Total: 246,018
  - Estimate (2025): 249,625 ▲
  - Rank: US: 93rd TX: 13th
  - Density: 4,306.2/sq mi (1,662.6/km^{2})
- Time zone: UTC−6 (CST)
  - Summer (DST): UTC−5 (CDT)
- ZIP codes: 75040-75049
- Area codes: 214, 469, 945, 972
- FIPS code: 48-29000
- GNIS feature ID: 2410572
- Website: garlandtx.gov

Garland is a city in Dallas County, Texas, with portions extending into Collin and Rockwall counties. It is northeast of Dallas and is a part of the Dallas-Fort Worth metro area. In 2020, it had a population of 246,018, making it the 93rd-most-populous city in the United States and the 13th-most-populous city in Texas. Garland is the third largest city in Dallas County by population and has access to downtown Dallas via public transportation including two DART Blue Line stations and buses.

== History ==
Immigrants began arriving in the Peters colony area around 1850, but a community was not created until 1874. Two communities sprang up in the area: Embree, named for physician K. H. Embree, and Duck Creek, named for the local creek of the same name. A rivalry between the two towns ensued as the area began to grow around the Santa Fe Railroad depot.

Eventually, to settle a dispute regarding which town should have the local post office, Dallas County Judge Thomas F. Nash asked visiting Congressman Joe Abbott to move the post office between the two towns. The move was completed in 1887. The new location was named Garland after U.S. Attorney General Augustus Hill Garland.

Soon after, the towns of Embree and Duck Creek were combined, and the three areas combined to form the city of Garland, which was incorporated in 1891. By 1904 the town had a population of 819 people.

In 1920 local businessmen financed a new electrical generator plant (sold by Fairbanks-Morse) for the town. This later led to the formation of Garland Power and Light, the municipal electric provider that still powers the city today.

On May 9, 1927, a devastating F4 tornado struck the town and killed 15 people, including the former mayor, S. E. Nicholson.

Businesses began to move back into the area in the late 1930s. The Craddock food company and later the Byer-Rolnick hat factory (now owned by Resistol) moved into the area. In 1937, KRLD, a major Dallas radio station, built its radio antenna tower in Garland, and it is operational to this day.

During World War II several aircraft plants were operated in the area, and the Kraft Foods company purchased a vacant one after the war for its own use. By 1950, the population of Garland exceeded 10,000 people. From 1950 to 1954, though, the Dallas/Garland area suffered from a serious and extended drought, so to supplement the water provided by wells, Garland began using the water from the nearby Lake Lavon.

The suburban population boom that the whole country experienced after World War II also reached Garland by 1960, when the population nearly quadrupled from the 1950 figure to about 38,500. By 1970, the population had doubled to about 81,500. By 1980, the population reached 138,850. Charles R. Matthews served as mayor in the 1980s; he was later a member of the elected Texas Railroad Commission.

In 1987 Walmart launched their initial Hypermart USA prototype in Garland, the first ever attempt by Walmart to offer groceries in the world.

In the 2000s, Garland added several notable developments, mostly in the northern portion of the city. Hawaiian Falls waterpark opened in 2003. (Garland formerly had a Wet 'n Wild waterpark, which closed in 1993). The Garland Independent School District's Curtis Culwell Center (formerly called the Special Events Center), an arena and conference facility, opened in 2005.

Later that year, Firewheel Town Center, a Main Street-style outdoor mall, owned by Simon Property Group, opened in October 2005. It has over 100 business and includes an AMC theater. In 2009, the city, in conjunction with developer Trammell Crow Company, finished a public/private partnership to develop the old parking lot (the land between 5th Street, 6th Street, and on the north side of Austin Street) into a new mixed-use, transit-oriented development named 5th Street Crossing. Cater-corner to both City Hall and the downtown DART Rail station, the project consists of 189 residential apartment units, 11,000 square feet (1,000 m^{2}) of flex retail, and six live-work units.

On May 3, 2015, the Curtis Culwell Center attack took place in Garland. The attack ended in a shootout with police guarding the event and the deaths of the two perpetrators.

The southeast side of Garland suffered a major blow on the night of December 26, 2015, after a large EF4 tornado struck the area, moving north from Sunnyvale. Nine fatalities were confirmed in the city from this event. Exactly 6 years later, a mass shooting took place at a convenience store in Garland, resulting in the deaths of 3 people.

== Geography ==
Garland, Texas

Climate chart (precipitation, max. and min. temperature)
| J | F | M | A | M | J | J | A | S | O | N | D |
| 2.3 53 31 | 2.8 59 36 | 3.3 67 43 | 3.6 75 51 | 5.3 82 60 | 4.1 90 67 | 2.2 94 71 | 1.9 94 71 | 3.3 88 64 | 4.6 78 53 | 3.4 65 42 | 3.4 56 34 |
- █ Average max. and min. temperatures in °F
- █ Precipitation totals in inches
- Source: Weather.com / NWS
Metric conversion
| J | F | M | A | M | J | J | A | S | O | N | D |
| 57 12 −1 | 70 15 2 | 84 19 6 | 92 24 11 | 134 28 16 | 105 32 19 | 56 34 22 | 47 34 22 | 83 31 18 | 117 26 12 | 86 18 6 | 85 13 1 |
- █ Average max. and min. temperatures in °C
- █ Precipitation totals in mm

According to the United States Census Bureau, the city has a total area of 57.1 sq mi (147.9 km^{2}), all land.

=== Neighborhoods and historical communities ===
- Buckingham North
- Duck Creek
- Centerville
- Club Hill
- Eastern Hills
- Embree
- Firewheel
- Oaks
- Rose Hill
- Spring Park
- Travis College Hill Addition
- Valley Creek*
- The 5
- Oakridge
- Brentwood Place
- Brentwood Village

=== Climate ===
Garland is part of the humid subtropical region. The average warmest month is July, with the highest recorded temperature being 111 °F (44 °C) in 2000. Typically, the coolest month is January, when the lowest recorded temperature was −3 °F (−19 °C) in 1989. The maximum average precipitation occurs in May.

== Demographics ==
Historical population
| Census | Pop. | Note | %± |
|---|---|---|---|
| 1890 | 478 | | — |
| 1900 | 819 | | 71.3% |
| 1910 | 804 | | −1.8% |
| 1920 | 1,421 | | 76.7% |
| 1930 | 1,584 | | 11.5% |
| 1940 | 2,233 | | 41.0% |
| 1950 | 10,571 | | 373.4% |
| 1960 | 38,501 | | 264.2% |
| 1970 | 81,437 | | 111.5% |
| 1980 | 138,857 | | 70.5% |
| 1990 | 180,650 | | 30.1% |
| 2000 | 215,768 | | 19.4% |
| 2010 | 226,876 | | 5.1% |
| 2020 | 246,018 | | 8.4% |
| 2025 (est.) | 249,625 | ▲ | 1.5% |
U.S. Decennial Census; Texas Almanac: 1850–2000; 2020 population

=== Racial and ethnic composition ===
Garland city, Texas – Racial and ethnic composition Note: the US Census treats Hispanic/Latino as an ethnic category. This table excludes Latinos from the racial categories and assigns them to a separate category. Hispanics/Latinos may be of any race.
| Race / Ethnicity (NH = Non-Hispanic) | Pop 2000 | Pop 2010 | Pop 2020 | % 2000 | % 2010 | % 2020 |
|---|---|---|---|---|---|---|
| White alone (NH) | 114,985 | 83,259 | 67,190 | 53.29% | 36.70% | 27.31% |
| Black or African American alone (NH) | 25,326 | 32,164 | 36,327 | 11.74% | 14.18% | 14.77% |
| Native American or Alaska Native alone (NH) | 887 | 789 | 619 | 0.41% | 0.35% | 0.25% |
| Asian alone (NH) | 15,695 | 21,162 | 29,221 | 7.27% | 9.33% | 11.88% |
| Pacific Islander alone (NH) | 108 | 65 | 78 | 0.05% | 0.03% | 0.03% |
| Other Race alone (NH) | 270 | 308 | 941 | 0.13% | 0.14% | 0.38% |
| Mixed race or Multiracial (NH) | 3,305 | 3,345 | 6,697 | 1.53% | 1.47% | 2.72% |
| Hispanic or Latino (any race) | 55,192 | 85,784 | 104,945 | 25.58% | 37.81% | 42.66% |
| Total | 215,768 | 226,876 | 246,018 | 100.00% | 100.00% | 100.00% |

=== 2020 census ===
As of the 2020 census, Garland had a population of 246,018 and a median age of 35.5 years, with 24.9% of residents under the age of 18 and 12.9% of residents 65 years of age or older. For every 100 females there were 96.5 males, and for every 100 females age 18 and over there were 93.7 males age 18 and over.

100.0% of residents lived in urban areas, while 0.0% lived in rural areas.

There were 82,069 households in Garland, of which 38.0% had children under the age of 18 living in them. Of all households, 49.0% were married-couple households, 17.1% were households with a male householder and no spouse or partner present, and 27.7% were households with a female householder and no spouse or partner present. About 20.8% of all households were made up of individuals and 7.7% had someone living alone who was 65 years of age or older.

There were 86,182 housing units, of which 4.8% were vacant. The homeowner vacancy rate was 1.0% and the rental vacancy rate was 6.9%.

Racial composition as of the 2020 census
| Race | Number | Percent |
|---|---|---|
| White | 86,453 | 35.1% |
| Black or African American | 37,094 | 15.1% |
| American Indian and Alaska Native | 3,250 | 1.3% |
| Asian | 29,487 | 12.0% |
| Native Hawaiian and Other Pacific Islander | 148 | 0.1% |
| Some other race | 47,279 | 19.2% |
| Two or more races | 42,307 | 17.2% |
| Hispanic or Latino (of any race) | 104,945 | 42.7% |

In 2020, the composition of the city was 27.31% non-Hispanic white, 14.77% Black or African American, 0.25% Native American, 11.88% Asian, 0.03% Pacific Islander, 0.38% some other race, 2.72% multiracial, and 42.66% Hispanic or Latino of any race.

=== 2010 census ===
Of the 75,696 households in 2010, 36.9% had children under 18 living with them, 52.0% were married couples living together, 16.1% had a female householder with no husband present, and 25.7% were not families. About 20.8% of all households were made up of individuals, and 6.5% had someone living alone who was 65 or older. The average household size was 2.99, and the average family size was 3.48.

In the city, the population was distributed as 28.5% under the age of 18, 9.6% from 18 to 24, 28.0% from 25 to 44, 24.7% from 45 to 64, and 9.2% who were 65 years of age or older at the 2010 United States census. The median age was 33.7 years. For every 100 females, there were 96.1 males. For every 100 females age 18 and over, there were 92.6 males.

The racial and ethnic makeup of the city was 57.5% White, 14.5% African American, 0.8% Native American, 9.4% Asian, 0.04% Pacific Islander, 14.4% some other race, and 3.3% from two or more races in 2010. Hispanics or Latinos of any race were 37.8% of the population. Non-Hispanic whites were 36.7% of the population, down from 86.5% in 1980.

According to the 2010 U.S. census, Garland has the 16th-largest number of Vietnamese Americans in the United States.

=== 2000 census ===
As of 2000, 12% of the foreign-born population of Garland originated from Vietnam. Two strip-style shopping malls along Walnut Street cater to Vietnamese people, and a community center as of 2009 hosts first-generation Vietnamese immigrants.

=== American Community Survey ===
At the 2018 American Community Survey, 25.9% of households had children under the age of 18 living with them and the median age was 34.1. Of the adult population, 48.1% were male and 51.9% were female, and the average household size was 3.25 while the average family size was 3.71. Roughly 0.3% of households in Garland were same-sex, unmarried-partner households and 5.3% opposite-sex, unmarried-partner households.

Following continued trends of diversification, the racial and ethnic makeup at 2018's census estimates were 27% non-Hispanic White, 14% African American, 0.7% American Indian or Alaska Native, 12.4% Asian, 0.5% some other race, 1.7% two or more races, and 43.2% Hispanic or Latino American of any race.

Within the local Hispanic or Latino demographic, the largest nationality were Mexican Americans (34.2%). Puerto Ricans made up the second largest single Latin group (0.5%) followed by 42 Cuban Americans and 8.5% other Hispanic and Latino Americans.

According to the U.S. Census Bureau's 2007–2011 American Community Survey, the median income for a household in the city was $52,441, and for a family was $57,293. Males had a median income of $36,041 versus $33,950 for females. The per capita income for the city was $20,000. About 11.1% of families and 14.5% of the population were below the poverty line, including 21.7% of those under age 18 and 7.3% of those age 65 or over. The median income for a household in Garland as of 2018 was $60,374.

In 2018, an estimated 242,402 people, 74,489 households, and 77,626 housing units were in the city.

=== Religion ===
The majority of Garland's local population are affiliated with a religion, being part of the largest Christian-dominated metropolitan area in the United States. As of 2020, the Catholic Church is the largest single Christian denomination in the city and wider Dallas–Fort Worth–Arlington metropolitan statistical area. Garland's Catholic population is served by the Roman Catholic Diocese of Dallas, one of the largest jurisdictions of the Catholic Church in the United States.

Following, Baptists were the second-largest Christian denomination, and the largest Protestant group in the city limits. Baptists are traditionally divided among the Southern Baptist Convention, National Baptists (USA and America) and Texas Baptists. The third largest Christian denomination in the city of Garland are Methodists. Other prominent Christian denominations were the Church of Jesus Christ of Latter-Day Saints, Pentecostalism, Lutheranism, Presbyterianism, and Episcopalianism. An estimated 12.2% of the total religious population professed another Christian faith. The largest non-Christian religion according to Sperling's BestPlaces was Islam, followed by Judaism and the eastern religions including Buddhism, Sikhism, and Hinduism.

In 1997, the Taiwanese UFO religion Chen Tao moved many of its members to Garland, where they believed the Second Coming of Jesus Christ would occur.

== Economy ==
In the late 1930s, the Craddock food company, which manufactured pickles, moved to town. In 1937, the KRLD (Dallas) radio tower was constructed in Garland. During World War II, several aircraft plants operated in the Garland area. After the war, Kraft Foods bought the Continental Motors Plant to retool for its manufacture. The Kraft plant still operates to this day. As a station on two railroads, Garland was a major onion-shipping point in the 1940s.

Resistol Hats in Garland is a notable manufacturer of premium hats, many of which have been worn by or given to notable figures around the world. The company has long been an important part of Garland's manufacturing base. The company was founded by E.R. Byer and Harry Rolnick, who established Byer-Rolnick in Dallas in 1927. At the time, the company produced men's felt hats. The company used the name "Resistol Hats" to indicate that the hats could "resist-all" weather conditions. Some accounts contend the name was given because the headbands in the company's hats were more resistant to scalp oil. The growing firm needed to expand. In 1938, it moved to a larger facility in Garland, where Resistol hats continue to be manufactured today. For decades, residents surrounding the hat factory could set their clocks to its whistle.

In the early 1980s, Garland had one of the lowest poverty rates of cities in the country. In 1990, it had a population of 180,650 and 2,227 businesses, making it Dallas County's second-largest city and the 10th-largest in the state. Today, Garland had a variety of industries, including electronics, steel fabrication, oilfield equipment, aluminium die casting, hat manufacture, dairy products, and food processors.

Wingstop was founded in Garland in 1994 by Antonio Swad and Bernadette Fiaschetti. The first franchised location opened in 1997, and by 2002, the brand claimed to have served two million wings.

=== Top employers ===
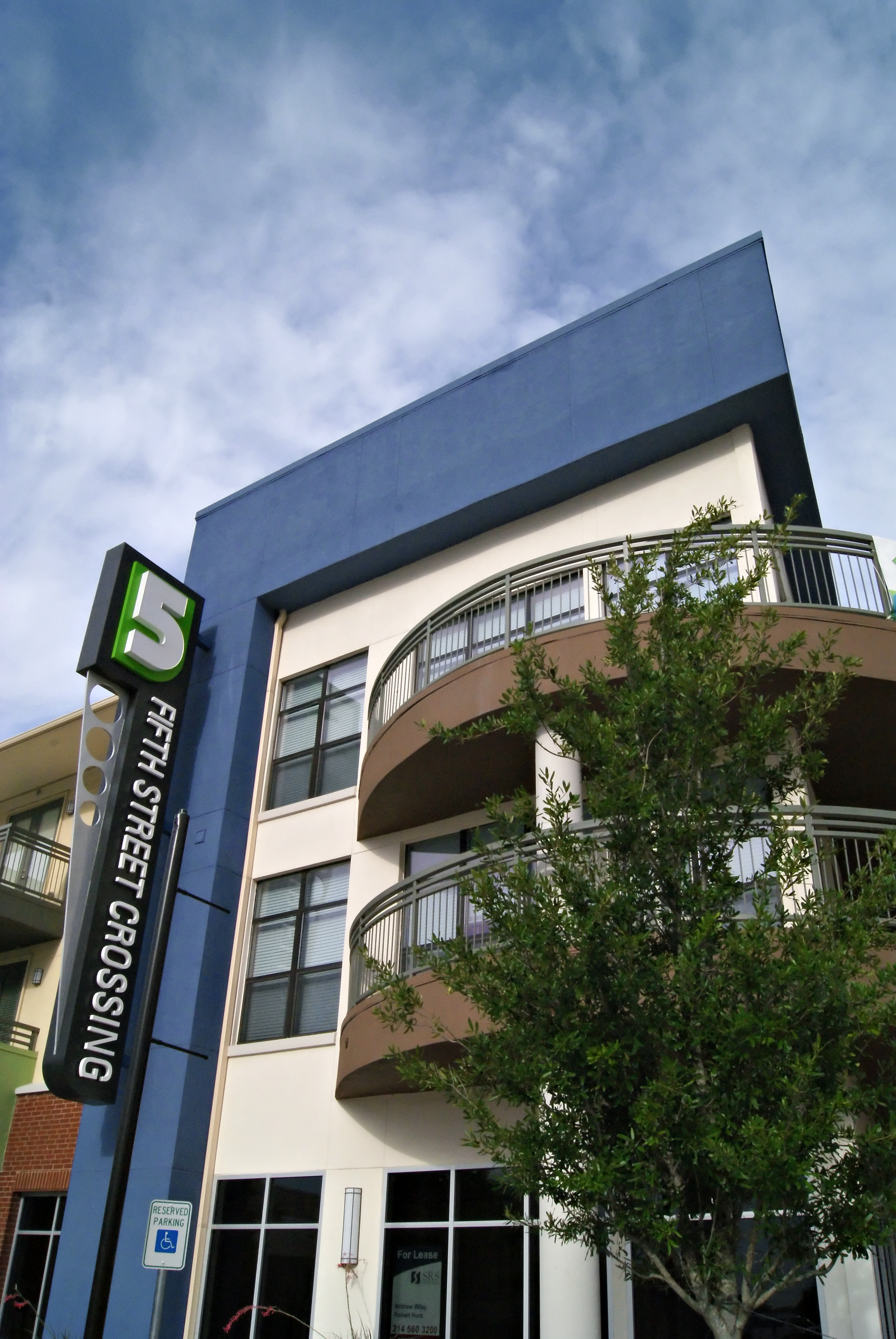
The new 5th Street Crossing mixed-use transit-oriented development

According to the City of Garland's Economic Development Partnership website, the top employers in the city are:

| # | Employer | Employees |
|---|---|---|
| 1 | Garland Independent School District | 7,425 |
| 2 | City of Garland | 2,000 |
| 3 | Kraft Foods | 796 |
| 4 | US Food Service | 520 |
| 5 | Epiroc Drilling Solutions | 460 |
| 6 | SilverLine Window | 425 |
| 7 | Hatco (Resistol) | 390 |
| 8 | L3-Communication | 350 |
| 9 | Arrow Fabricated Tubing | 340 |
| 10 | Valspar | 300 |

Garland has seen many of their major employers replaced over the last few years leading to multiple redevelopment projects. A prior Raytheon campus was demolished and rebuilt into three new industrial buildings. The large Sears distribution building was renovated and is currently being used by Costco wholesale. A hospital formerly owned by Baylor Scott & White Health has become a new VA Medical Center and the City of Garland has announced an ambitious streetscapes masterplan for the surrounding medical district with the goal of attracting a new community hospital provider.

== Arts and culture ==
=== Entertainment ===
Patty Granville Arts Center

The Granville Arts Center is a complex owned and operated by the city. Included within the complex are two proscenium theatres which seat 720 and 200, respectively. Also included as part of the complex is the Plaza Theatre, which has seating for 350. The Plaza Theatre is a historic entertainment venue. The Plaza Theatre was refurbished and is used for business conferences, concerts, receptions, and stage productions. It is also host to paintings by artist Bruce Cody. The Atrium at the Granville Arts Center is a 6,500-square-foot (600 m^{2}) ballroom encased in glass on two sides and opening onto an outdoor courtyard. The Atrium provides civic, community and commercial organizations the opportunity to house banquets, receptions, trade shows, and conventions.

=== Landmarks ===
Garland is home to the Pace House, which was the original home of John H. Pace and his wife; it was built in the Queen Anne-style architecture. The Pace House was recognized as a historic landmark by the Dallas County Historic Resource Survey of 1982.

Other historic areas of the city include the Garland Landmark Museum, housed in the former 1901 Santa Fe depot. Inside are historical artifacts and documents representing the period from 1850 to the present. Historic Downtown Garland is another local landmark. Historic Downtown Garland was listed in the National Register of Historic Places in 2017.

Travis College Hill Historic District, a residential neighborhood in downtown Garland, was the first site in Garland history to be added to the National Register of Historic Places, administered by the U.S. Department of the Interior through its National Park Service. Two months later, the downtown square and surrounding buildings became the second site in Garland added to the listing. Travis College Hill consists of 12 homes whose period of significance is 1913 to 1960. Travis College Hill was platted in January 1913 by developer R.O. Travis.

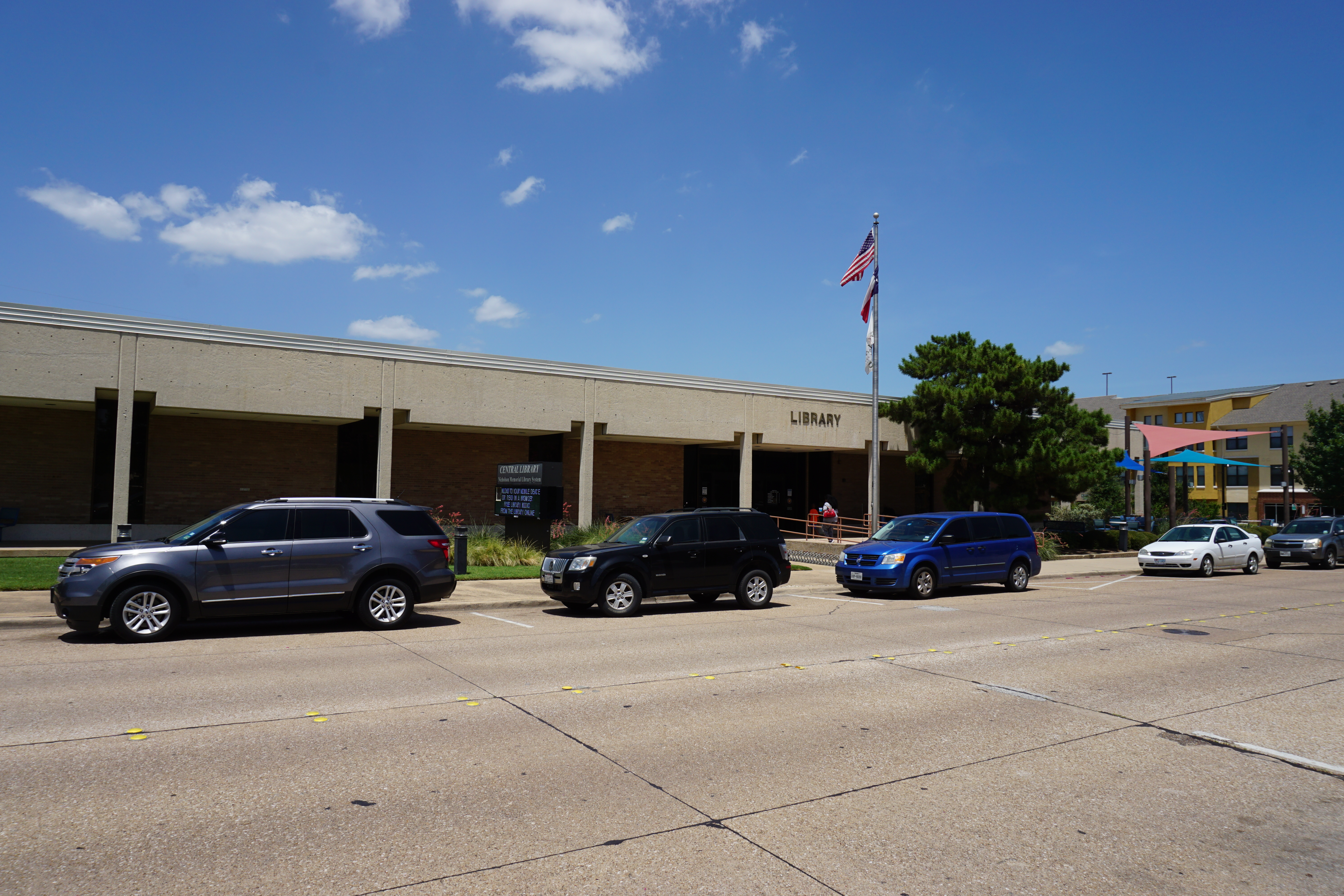
The Nicholson Memorial Library System's Central Library in July 2015

On May 9, 1927, a tornado destroyed much of the city and killed 17 people, including a former mayor, S. E. Nicholson. Six years later, the Nicholson Memorial Library opened in his honor.

The Nicholson Memorial Library System is also the Major Resource Center, or headquarters, of the Northeast Texas Library System (NETLS). NETLS serves a 33-county area that includes 105 member libraries. The Nicholson Memorial Library System headquarters and offices have been housed in NMLS' Central Library since 1983.

== Parks and recreation ==
Garland includes over 2,880 acres (1,170 ha) of park land, six recreation centers, and 63 parks.

== Government ==
The city of Garland is a voluntary member of the North Central Texas Council of Governments association, the purpose of which is to coordinate individual and collective local governments and facilitate regional solutions, eliminate unnecessary duplication, and enable joint decisions.

The Parkland Health & Hospital System (Dallas County Hospital District) operates the Garland Health Center.

The Texas Department of Public Safety operates the Region I office in Garland.

The Texas Department of Criminal Justice operates the Dallas II District Parole Offices in Garland.

The United States Postal Service operates the Garland, Kingsley, and North Garland post offices.

=== Politics ===
Garland city vote by party in presidential elections
| Year | Democratic | Republican | Third parties |
|---|---|---|---|
| 2024 | 52.4% 39,720 | 45.2% 34,295 | 2.4% 1,813 |
| 2020 | 56.69% 46,148 | 41.79% 34,023 | 1.52% 1,235 |
| 2016 | 52.22% 34,913 | 41.86% 27,988 | 5.92% 3,954 |
| 2012 | 47.46% 29,506 | 51.15% 31,801 | 1.39% 866 |

Garland city vote by party in Senate elections
| Year | Democratic | Republican | Third parties |
|---|---|---|---|
| 2020 | 53.77% 43,480 | 43.21% 34,942 | 3.02% 2,443 |

== Education ==
=== Primary and secondary schools ===
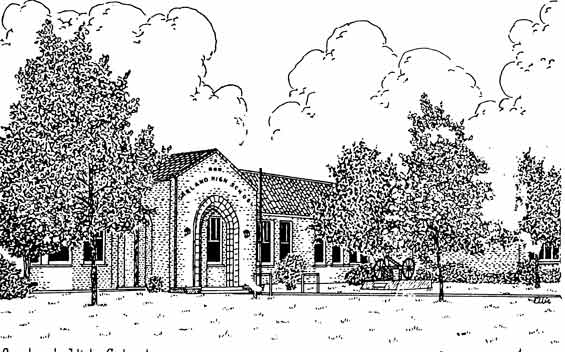
The more than 100-year-old Garland High School: This lineart graphic displays the historic front of the high school that faces South Garland Ave in the Downtown Garland District.

Most of Garland is in the Garland Independent School District (GISD). Parts of Garland extend into other districts, including the Dallas, Mesquite, and Richardson Independent School Districts.

The GISD does not have school zoning, so GISD residents may apply to any GISD school.

The GISD portion of Garland is served by several high schools. Garland High School is home to the district's international baccalaureate program. North Garland High School is the math, science and technology magnet. Lakeview Centennial High School is GISD's "College and Career" magnet school. South Garland High School is known within the community for its vocational cosmetology program. Other GISD high schools include Naaman Forest, Rowlett, and Sachse High Schools.

The Mesquite ISD portion of Garland is served by Price Elementary School, Vanston Middle School, and North Mesquite High School.

The Richardson ISD portion is served by Big Springs Elementary School, O. Henry Elementary School, Apollo Junior High School, and Berkner High School, which are in the western and northern portions of Garland.

As of November 2006, the GISD had 52,391 students and 3,236 teachers, for an average ratio of 16.2 students per teacher. The 2006 GISD property tax rate was $1.5449 per hundred dollars of assessed property value.

For a private Christian school option, hundreds of families have chosen for their children to attend Garland Christian Academy, which was founded in 1972. The city also has a Pre-K–12 Islamic school, Brighter Horizons Academy.

=== Colleges and universities ===
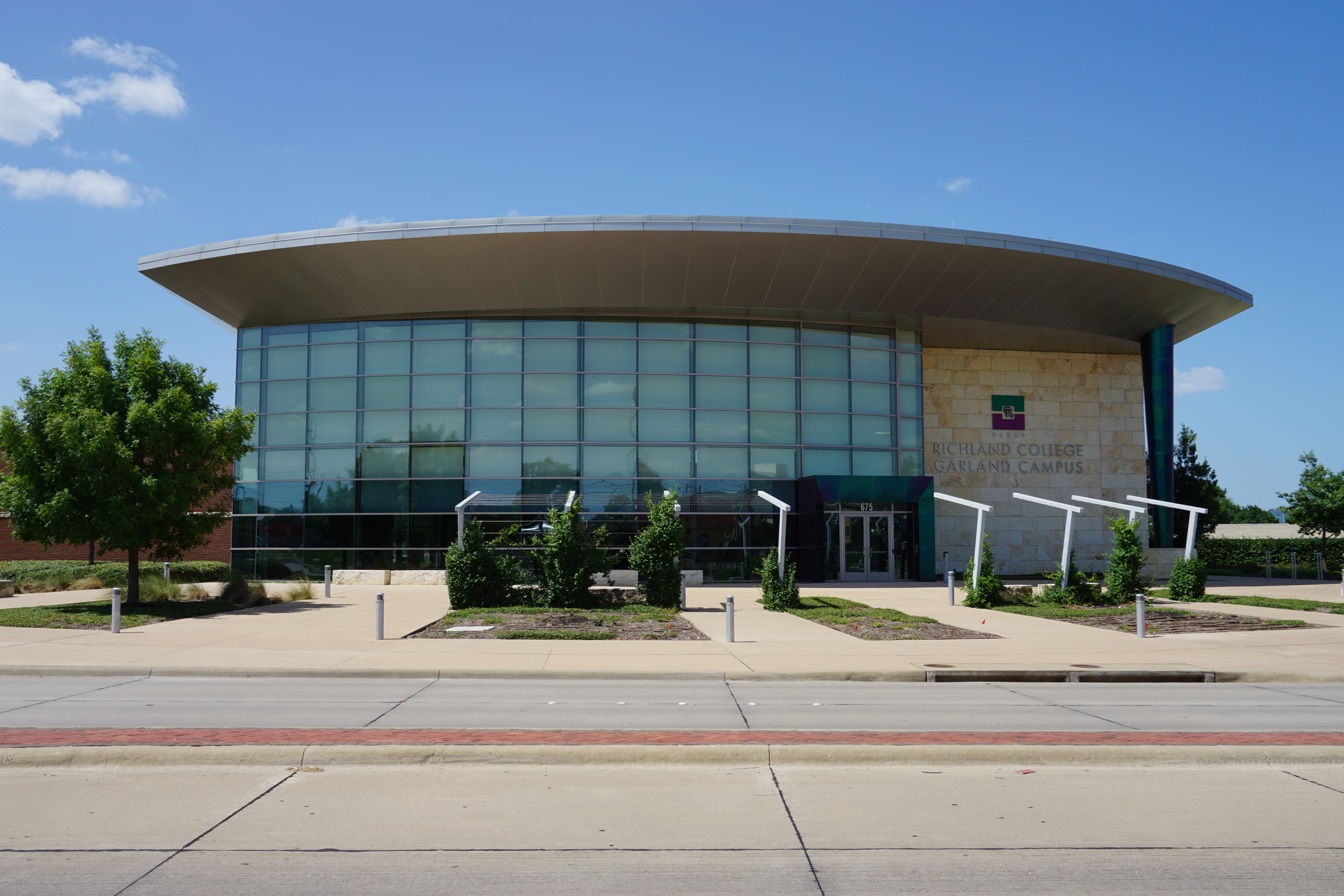
Richland College Garland Campus in July 2015

Dallas County residents are zoned to Dallas College (formerly Dallas County Community College or DCCCD). Richland College, a member of Dallas College, states, operates a Garland Campus which has been in operation since June 30, 2009.

Garland is also the home of Amberton University, a fully accredited private university with both undergraduate and graduate degree programs. Amberton University was formerly known as Amber University and previously known as Abilene Christian University at Dallas.

== Infrastructure ==
=== Transportation ===
The city of Garland has a lower than average percentage of households without a car. In 2015, 4.6 percent of Garland households lacked a car, and that figure was virtually unchanged in 2014 (4.4 percent). The national average was 8.7 percent in 2014. Garland averaged 2.04 cars per household in 2014, compared to a national average of 1.8. According to the American Community Survey for 2014 (five-year average), 78.8 percent of Garland residents commuted by driving alone, 13.1 carpooled, 2.5 used public transportation, and .9 percent walked. About 1.3 percent of Garland residents commuted to work by bicycle, taxi, motorcycle, or some other means, while 3.5 percent worked out of the home.

==== Major highways ====
- Interstate 30
- Interstate 635 (Lyndon B. Johnson Freeway)
- Texas State Highway 66
- Texas State Highway 78 (Garland Road, Lavon Drive)
- President George Bush Turnpike
- Belt Line Loop (some parts are named First Street and Broadway Boulevard)

==== Trains ====
A Kansas City Southern track runs parallel to State Highway 78 (Garland Road and Lavon Drive), coming out of Dallas and heading all the way through the other side of Garland towards Wylie. There is also a Dallas, Garland and Northeastern Railroad line serving industries around the city.

===== Light rail =====
- Dallas Area Rapid Transit provides the Blue Line to Forest/Jupiter station and Downtown Garland station.

==== Air ====
The city of Garland owns the Garland/DFW Heloplex. The facility was the first municipal heliport in Texas when it opened in November 1989. Located at 2559 S. Jupiter Road, the heliport is operated by SKY Helicopters Inc., which was initially awarded a lease of the facility in January 1993.

=== Utilities ===
The city of Garland operates the city's water system and waste services. Electricity for about 85% of Garland is provided by the city's municipal utility, Garland Power and Light (GP&L). Electricity for the other 15% was formerly provided by TXU, but is now supplied by multiple companies after deregulation of the Texas electricity market.

==== Water and wastewater utilities ====
Garland is an original member city of the North Texas Municipal Water District (NTMWD). The vision of the city fathers in the early 1940s resulted in Garland and its companion member cities benefitting from reliable, high quality, affordable water from the water district's many reservoirs.

The effluent from Garland's wastewater treatment plant flows through a NTMWD man-made, 1,840-acre (7.4 km^{2}) wetland. This provides a natural habitat for a wide variety of birds and reduces the sediment, nitrogen, and phosphorus contents of the water to a drinkable level. Through the use of selected aquatic plants, this environmentally friendly project will provide millions of gallons of reusable water and reduce the environmental impact.

==== Garland Power and Light ====
GP&L was founded in 1923 to provide Garland residents not-for-profit public utility services, locally controlled by its citizens. GP&L provides services to over 69,000 customers, making it the fourth-largest municipal utility in Texas and the 41st-largest in the nation. It has two gas-fired generating plants, which combined have 640 megawatts of generation capacity. Garland also partners with the Texas Municipal Power Agency, which operates the 462-megawatt coal-fired Gibbons Creek Power Plant. Garland's electric distribution system has 1,007 mi (1,621 km) of overhead lines and 1,000 mi (1,600 km) of underground lines. Its transmission system consists of 23 substations and 133 mi (214 km) of transmission lines. Garland's peak load for 2007 was 483 megawatts, with annual operating revenues of nearly $238 million.

=== Healthcare ===
Hospitals include Medical City, and Total Care.

== Notable people ==
- Hakeem Adeniji, offensive lineman for the Cleveland Browns of the NFL
- Troy Baker, voice and screen actor known for video game performances, attended Naaman Forest High School
- Tyson Ballou, model
- Crystal Bernard, starred as K.C. Cunningham on the TV sitcom Happy Days and as Helen in the show Wings
- Mookie Blaylock, NBA basketball player
- Johnny Yong Bosch, actor, musician, and martial artist, raised in Garland
- C. L. Bryant, Baptist minister and conservative talk-show host, resided in Garland
- Amber Dotson, country music artist
- Brian Adam Douglas, Brooklyn-based artist
- Samuel Eguavoen, linebacker for the New York Jets of the NFL
- Anu Emmanuel, actress
- William Jackson Harper, actor and playwright, grew up in Garland
- Caleb Landry Jones, actor
- Chris Jones (born 1993), basketball player for Valencia Basket and the Armenian national team.
- Tyrese Maxey, basketball player for the Philadelphia 76ers of the NBA
- Brooke Mayo, FIFA soccer referee
- Keith Mitchell, football player in the NFL between 1997 and 2003
- Mitchel Musso, actor and musician
- Adrienne Palmer, professional wrestler Athena, previously known as Ember Moon in WWE
- Adrian Phillips, NFL football player
- Ricky Pierce, NBA guard, NBA All-Star, 2× winner of NBA 6th Man of the Year Award, raised in Garland
- LeAnn Rimes, musician, grew up in Garland
- Stacy Sanches, actress, model, 1996 Playboy Playmate of the Year, 1992 graduate of Lakeview Centennial High School in Garland
- Gene Summers, musician
- Lee Trevino, golfer, was born in Garland (1939)
- LTC Allen West, chair of Texas GOP; former Florida Congressman
- Xander Cole, actor

== See also ==
- Curtis Culwell Center attack
- 2015 Garland tornado
