= Oncovirus =

Viruses that can cause cancer

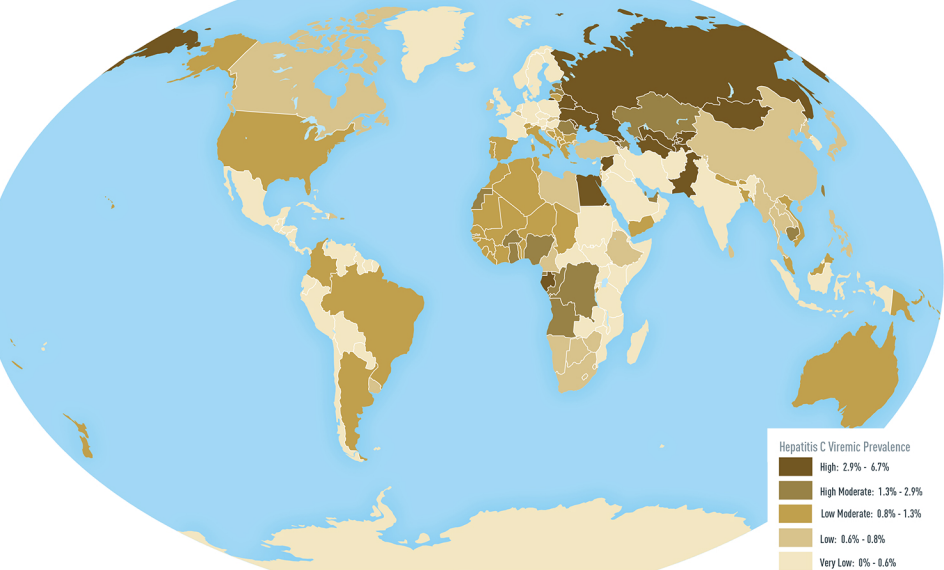
Percentage of people infected with hepatitis C in 2015. The hepatitis C virus is the cause of hepatitis C and some cancers such as liver cancer (hepatocellular carcinoma, abbreviated HCC) and lymphomas in humans.

An oncovirus or oncogenic virus is a virus that can cause cancer. This term originated from studies of acutely transforming retroviruses in the 1950–60s, when the term oncornaviruses was used to denote their RNA virus origin. With the letters RNA removed, it now refers to any virus with a DNA or RNA genome causing cancer and is synonymous with tumor virus or cancer virus. The vast majority of human and animal viruses do not cause cancer, probably because of longstanding co-evolution between the virus and its host. Oncoviruses have been important not only in epidemiology, but also in investigations of cell cycle control mechanisms such as the retinoblastoma protein.

The World Health Organization's International Agency for Research on Cancer estimated that in 2002, infection caused 17.8% of human cancers, with 11.9% caused by one of seven viruses. A 2020 study of 2,658 samples from 38 different types of cancer found that 16% were associated with a virus. These cancers might be easily prevented through vaccination (e.g., papillomavirus vaccines), diagnosed with simple blood tests, and treated with less-toxic antiviral compounds.

== Causality ==
Generally, tumor viruses cause little or no disease after infection in their hosts, or cause non-neoplastic diseases such as acute hepatitis for hepatitis B virus or mononucleosis for Epstein–Barr virus. A minority of persons (or animals) will go on to develop cancers after infection. This has complicated efforts to determine whether or not a given virus causes cancer. The well-known Koch's postulates, 19th-century constructs developed by Robert Koch to establish the likelihood that Bacillus anthracis will cause anthrax disease, are not applicable to viral diseases. Firstly, this is because viruses cannot truly be isolated in pure culture—even stringent isolation techniques cannot exclude undetected contaminating viruses with similar density characteristics, and viruses must be grown on cells. Secondly, asymptomatic virus infection and carriage is the norm for most tumor viruses, which violates Koch's third principle. Relman and Fredericks have described the difficulties in applying Koch's postulates to virus-induced cancers. Finally, the host restriction for human viruses makes it unethical to experimentally transmit a suspected cancer virus. Other measures, such as A. B. Hill's criteria, are more relevant to cancer virology but also have some limitations in determining causality.

Simplified diagram of the structure of the Epstein–Barr virus (EBV)

Tumor viruses come in a variety of forms: Viruses with a DNA genome, such as adenovirus, and viruses with an RNA genome, like the hepatitis C virus (HCV), can cause cancers, as can retroviruses having both DNA and RNA genomes (Human T-lymphotropic virus and hepatitis B virus, which normally replicates as a mixed double and single-stranded DNA virus but also has a retroviral replication component). In many cases, tumor viruses do not cause cancer in their native hosts but only in dead-end species. For example, adenoviruses do not cause cancer in humans but are instead responsible for colds, conjunctivitis and other acute illnesses. They only become tumorigenic when infected into certain rodent species, such as Syrian hamsters. Some viruses are tumorigenic when they infect a cell and persist as circular episomes or plasmids, replicating separately from host cell DNA (Epstein–Barr virus and Kaposi's sarcoma-associated herpesvirus). Other viruses are only carcinogenic when they integrate into the host cell genome as part of a biological accident, such as polyomaviruses and papillomaviruses.

== Oncogenic viral mechanism ==
A direct oncogenic viral mechanism involves either insertion of additional viral oncogenic genes into the host cell or to enhance already existing oncogenic genes (proto-oncogenes) in the genome. For example, it has been shown that vFLIP and vCyclin interfere with the TGF-β signaling pathway indirectly by inducing oncogenic host mir17-92 cluster. Acquiring or enhancing oncogenecity can be evolutionarily favorable to the virus because increasing cell proliferation tends to also increase viral load.

Indirect viral oncogenicity involves chronic nonspecific inflammation occurring over decades of infection, as is the case for HCV-induced liver cancer. These two mechanisms differ in their biology and epidemiology: direct tumor viruses must have at least one virus copy in every tumor cell expressing at least one protein or RNA that is causing the cell to become cancerous. Because foreign virus antigens are expressed in these tumors, persons who are immunosuppressed such as AIDS or transplant patients are at higher risk for these types of cancers.

Chronic indirect tumor viruses, on the other hand, can be lost (at least theoretically) from a mature tumor that has accumulated sufficient mutations and growth conditions (hyperplasia) from the chronic inflammation of viral infection. In this latter case, it is controversial but at least theoretically possible that an indirect tumor virus could undergo "hit-and-run" and so the virus would be lost from the clinically diagnosed tumor. In practical terms, this is an uncommon occurrence if it does occur.

== DNA oncoviruses ==
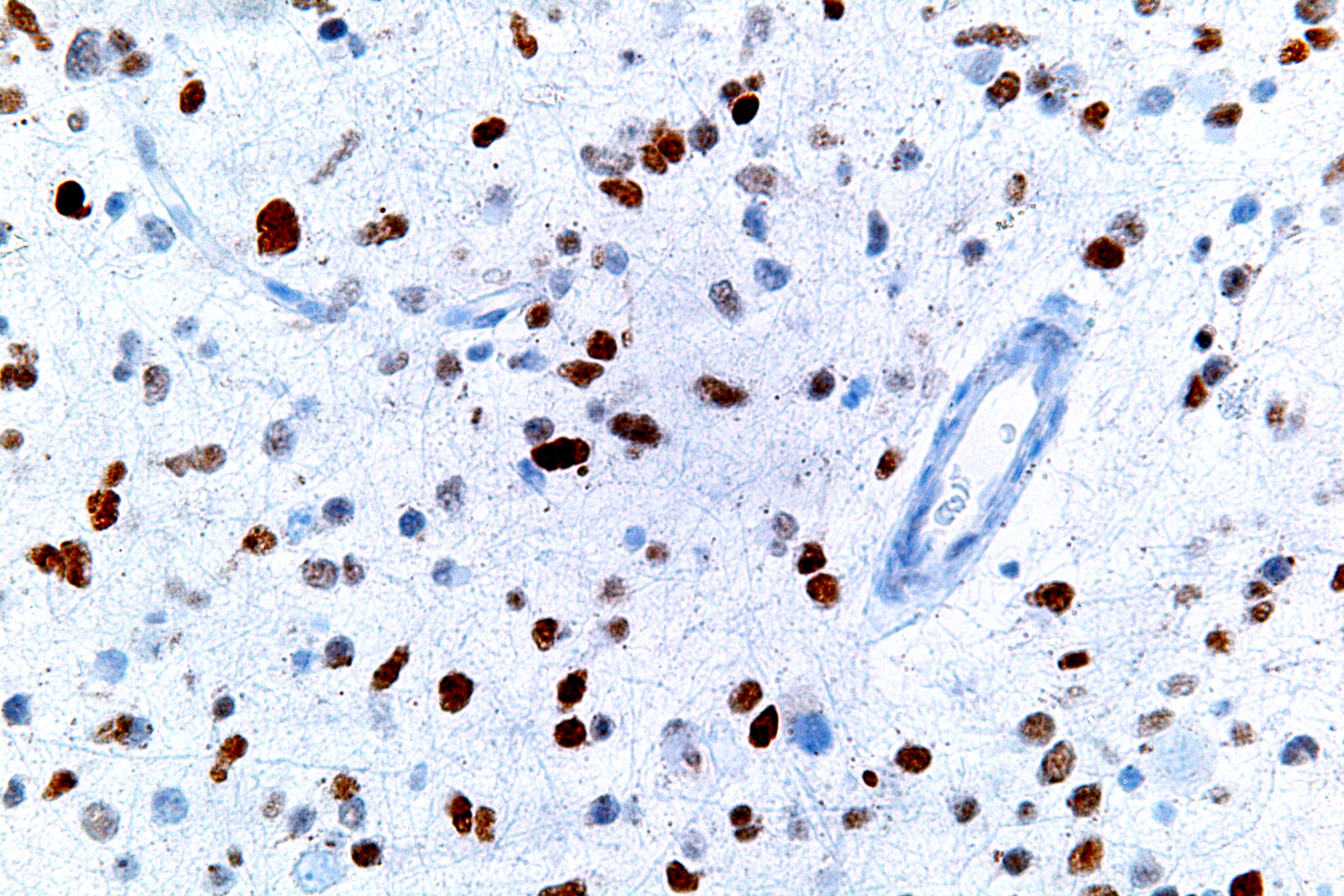
A micrograph showing cells with abnormal p53 expression (brown) in a brain tumor

DNA oncoviruses typically impair two families of tumor suppressor proteins: tumor proteins p53 and the retinoblastoma proteins (Rb). It is evolutionarily advantageous for viruses to inactivate p53 because p53 can trigger cell cycle arrest or apoptosis in infected cells when the virus attempts to replicate its DNA. Similarly, Rb proteins regulate many essential cell functions, including but not limited to a crucial cell cycle checkpoint, making them a target for viruses attempting to interrupt regular cell function.

While several DNA oncoviruses have been discovered, three have been studied extensively. Adenoviruses can lead to tumors in rodent models but do not cause cancer in humans; however, they have been exploited as delivery vehicles in gene therapy for diseases such as cystic fibrosis and cancer. Simian virus 40 (SV40), a polyomavirus, can cause tumors in rodent models but is not oncogenic in humans. This phenomenon has been one of the major controversies of oncogenesis in the 20th century because an estimated 100 million people were inadvertently exposed to SV40 through polio vaccines. The human papillomavirus-16 (HPV-16) has been shown to lead to cervical cancer and other cancers, including head and neck cancer. These three viruses have parallel mechanisms of action, forming an archetype for DNA oncoviruses. All three of these DNA oncoviruses are able to integrate their DNA into the host cell, and use this to transcribe it and transform cells by bypassing the G1/S checkpoint of the cell cycle.

=== Integration of viral DNA ===
DNA oncoviruses transform infected cells by integrating their DNA into the host cell's genome. The DNA is believed to be inserted during transcription or replication, when the two annealed strands are separated. This event is relatively rare and generally unpredictable; there seems to be no deterministic predictor of the site of integration. After integration, the host's cell cycle loses regulation from Rb and p53, and the cell begins cloning to form a tumor.

=== G1/S Checkpoint ===
Rb and p53 regulate the transition between G1 and S phase, arresting the cell cycle before DNA replication until the appropriate checkpoint inputs, such as DNA damage repair, are completed. p53 regulates the p21 gene, which produces a protein which binds to the Cyclin D-Cdk4/6 complex. This prevents Rb phosphorylation and prevents the cell from entering S phase. In mammals, when Rb is active (unphosphorylated), it inhibits the E2F family of transcription factors, which regulate the Cyclin E-Cdk2 complex, which inhibits Rb, forming a positive feedback loop, keeping the cell in G1 until the input crosses a threshold. To drive the cell into S phase prematurely, the viruses must inactivate p53, which plays a central role in the G1/S checkpoint, as well as Rb, which, though downstream of it, is typically kept active by a positive feedback loop.

=== Inactivation of p53 ===
Viruses employ various methods of inactivating p53. The adenovirus E1B protein (55K) prevents p53 from regulating genes by binding to the site on p53 which binds to the genome. In SV40, the large T antigen (LT) is an analogue; LT also binds to several other cellular proteins, such as p107 and p130, on the same residues. LT binds to p53's binding domain on the DNA (rather than on the protein), again preventing p53 from appropriately regulating genes. HPV instead degrades p53: the HPV protein E6 binds to a cellular protein called the E6-associated protein (E6-AP, also known as UBE3A), forming a complex which causes the rapid and specific ubiquitination of p53.

=== Inactivation of Rb ===
Rb is inactivated (thereby allowing the G1/S transition to progress unimpeded) by different but analogous viral oncoproteins. The adenovirus early region 1A (E1A) is an oncoprotein which binds to Rb and can stimulate transcription and transform cells. SV40 uses the same protein for inactivating Rb, LT, to inactivate p53. HPV contains a protein, E7, which can bind to Rb in much the same way. Rb can be inactivated by phosphorylation, or by being bound to a viral oncoprotein, or by mutations—mutations which prevent oncoprotein binding are also associated with cancer.

=== Variations ===
DNA oncoviruses typically cause cancer by inactivating p53 and Rb, thereby allowing unregulated cell division and creating tumors. There may be many different mechanisms which have evolved separately; in addition to those described above, for example, the Human Papillomavirus inactivates p53 by sequestering it in the cytoplasm.

SV40 has been well studied and does not cause cancer in humans, but a recently discovered analogue called Merkel cell polyomavirus has been associated with Merkel cell carcinoma, a form of skin cancer. The Rb binding feature is believed to be the same between the two viruses.

== Oncogenic retroviruses ==
Retroviruses have historically played an important role in identifying cellular oncogenes. In many cases, a retrovirus was first observed to induce malignant transformation in infected cells. Work was then done to find the part of the virus genome responsible, isolating the viral oncogene. It was then discovered that this viral oncogene has homologs in the cellular genome, suggesting that the cellular version may also cause cancer when mutated: a prediction that has turned out true in the case of Src, Kras, Hras, and many other proteins.

Based on sequence comparison, it was deduced that in all cases, the retrovirus had picked up the gene from the cellular genome rather than the other way around. This kind of acquisition happens more commonly in retroviruses than in other types of viruses because the retrovirus life-cycles includes integrating the reversed-transcribed version of the viral genome into a host chromosome, followed by it being transcribed out to form the progeny virion genome later. An interruption in the reverse-transcription process can cause a partial viral genome to be inserted into the host chromosome upstream of a gene, leading to the transcription of a malformed progeny virion RNA that starts with viral sequences but ends with host sequences. When this malformed RNA is packaged with correct RNA into a new viron, a new generation of reverse transcription would see the DNA products of these two strands cross-over and recombine into a new strand, a version of the genome with a cellular insertion.

All replication-capable retroviruses have three major coding domains; gag, pol and env. In the gag region of the virus, the synthesis of the structural virion proteins are maintained which make up the matrix, capsid and nucleocapsid proteins (along with a protease pro domain responsible for cutting up gag to free these pieces). In pol, the information for the reverse transcription and integration enzymes are stored. Env encodes the viral envelope protein, essential for cell entry. Some oncoviruses such as the Simian sarcoma virus are replication-defective because the insertion coincided with the deletion of one of these coding domains, rendering them dependent on a closely-related virus (or some other kind of viral-derived DNA complementing the loss, like the "chicken helper factor", an endogenous version of env) for replication.

== Classification ==
Kaposi's sarcoma is a cancer that can form masses in the skin and is caused by the Kaposi's sarcoma-associated herpesvirus (KSHV), also called HHV-8.

=== DNA viruses ===
- Human papillomavirus (HPV), a DNA virus, causes transformation in cells through interfering with tumor suppressor proteins such as p53. Interfering with the action of p53 allows a cell infected with the virus to move into a different stage of the cell cycle, enabling the virus genome to be replicated. Forcing the cell into the S phase of the cell cycle could cause the cell to become transformed. Human papillomavirus infection is a major cause of cervical cancer, vulvar cancer, vaginal cancer, penis cancer, anal cancer, and HPV-positive oropharyngeal cancers. There are nearly 200 distinct human papillomaviruses (HPVs), and many HPV types are carcinogenic.
- Hepatitis B virus (HBV) is associated with Hepatocarcinoma
- Epstein–Barr virus (EBV or HHV-4) is associated with four types of cancers
- Human cytomegalovirus (CMV or HHV-5) is associated with mucoepidermoid carcinoma and possibly other malignancies.
- Kaposi's sarcoma-associated herpesvirus (KSHV or HHV-8) is associated with Kaposi's sarcoma, a type of skin cancer.
- Merkel cell polyomavirus – a polyoma virus – is associated with the development of Merkel cell carcinoma

=== RNA viruses ===
Not all oncoviruses are DNA viruses. Some RNA viruses have also been associated such as the hepatitis C virus as well as certain retroviruses, e.g., human T-lymphotropic virus (HTLV-1) and Rous sarcoma virus (RSV).

=== Overview table ===
| Virus | Percent of cancers | Associated cancer types |
|---|---|---|
| Hepatitis B virus (HBV) | | Hepatocarcinoma |
| Hepatitis C virus (HCV) | | HCV is a known carcinogen, causing hepatocarcinoma |
| Human T-lymphotropic virus (HTLV) | 0.03 | Adult T-cell leukemia |
| Human papillomaviruses (HPV) | 5.2 | HPV types 16 and 18 are associated with cancers of cervix, anus, penis, vulva, vagina, and HPV-positive oropharyngeal cancers. According to statistics in the United States, females are more impacted by HPV-associated cancers (83%) than males (74%). |
| Kaposi's sarcoma-associated herpesvirus (HHV-8) | 0.9 | Kaposi's sarcoma, multicentric Castleman's disease and primary effusion lymphoma |
| Merkel cell polyomavirus (MCV) | NA | Merkel cell carcinoma |
| Epstein–Barr virus (EBV) | NA | Burkitt's lymphoma, Hodgkin's lymphoma, post-transplant lymphoproliferative disease, nasopharyngeal carcinoma and a subtype of stomach cancer. |

Estimated percent of new cancers attributable to the virus worldwide in 2002. NA indicates not available. The association of other viruses with human cancer is continually under research.

== Main viruses associated with human cancer ==
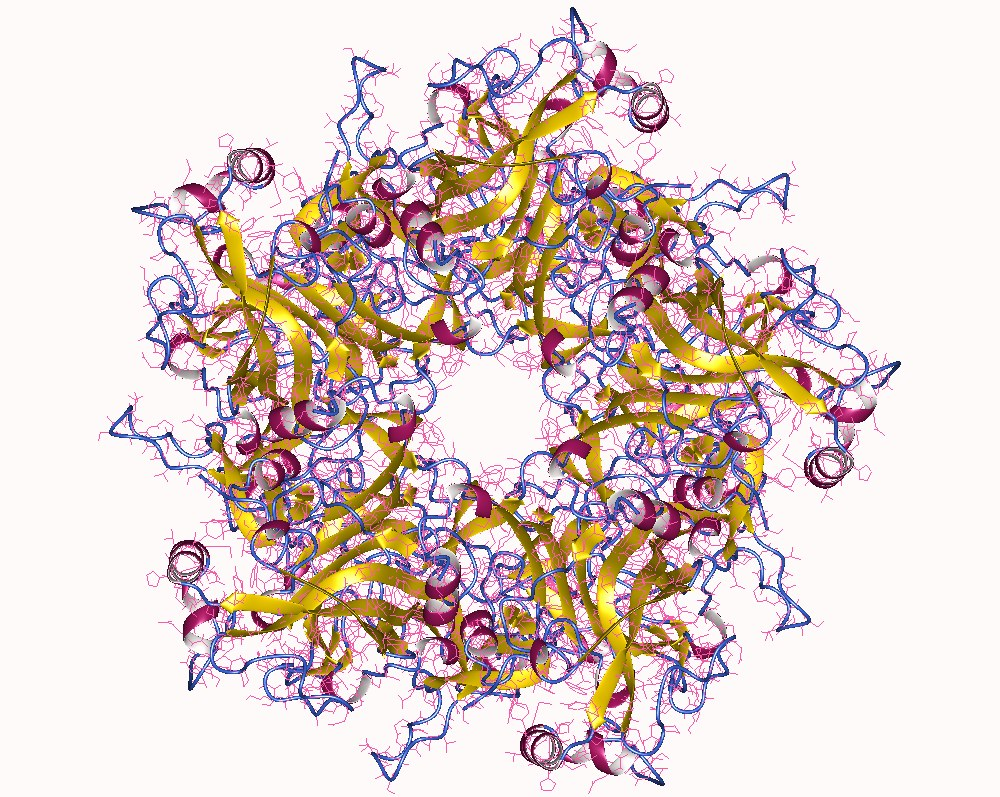
Major capsid protein L1 pentamer, Human papillomavirus 11

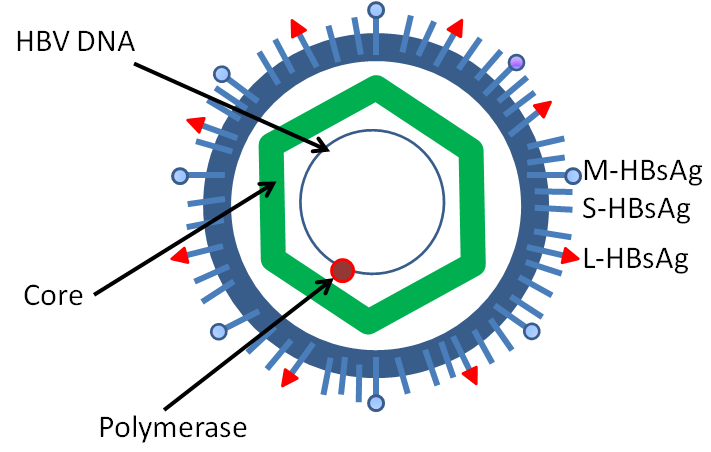
The structure of the hepatitis B virus

The main viruses associated with human cancers are the human papillomavirus, the hepatitis B and hepatitis C viruses, the Epstein–Barr virus, the human T-lymphotropic virus, the Kaposi's sarcoma-associated herpesvirus (KSHV) and the Merkel cell polyomavirus. Experimental and epidemiological data imply a causative role for viruses and they appear to be the second most important risk factor for cancer development in humans, exceeded only by tobacco usage. The mode of virally induced tumors can be divided into two, acutely transforming or slowly transforming. In acutely transforming viruses, the viral particles carry a gene that encodes for an overactive oncogene called viral-oncogene (v-onc), and the infected cell is transformed as soon as v-onc is expressed. In contrast, in slowly transforming viruses, the virus genome is inserted, especially as viral genome insertion is an obligatory part of retroviruses, near a proto-oncogene in the host genome. The viral promoter or other transcription regulation elements in turn cause overexpression of that proto-oncogene, which in turn induces uncontrolled cellular proliferation. Because viral genome insertion is not specific to proto-oncogenes and the chance of insertion near that proto-oncogene is low, slowly transforming viruses have very long tumor latency compared to acutely transforming viruses, which already carry the viral oncogene.

Hepatitis viruses, including hepatitis B and hepatitis C, can induce a chronic viral infection that leads to liver cancer in 0.47% of hepatitis B patients per year (especially in Asia, less so in North America), and in 1.4% of hepatitis C carriers per year. Liver cirrhosis, whether from chronic viral hepatitis infection or alcoholism, is associated with the development of liver cancer, and the combination of cirrhosis and viral hepatitis presents the highest risk of liver cancer development. Worldwide, liver cancer is one of the most common, and most deadly, cancers due to a huge burden of viral hepatitis transmission and disease.

Through advances in cancer research, vaccines designed to prevent cancer have been created. The hepatitis B vaccine is the first vaccine that has been established to prevent cancer (hepatocellular carcinoma) by preventing infection with the causative virus. In 2006, the U.S. Food and Drug Administration approved a human papilloma virus vaccine, called Gardasil. The vaccine protects against four HPV types, which together cause 70% of cervical cancers and 90% of genital warts. In March 2007, the US Centers for Disease Control and Prevention (CDC) Advisory Committee on Immunization Practices (ACIP) officially recommended that females aged 11–12 receive the vaccine, and indicated that females as young as age 9 and as old as age 26 are also candidates for immunization.

== History ==
The history of cancer virus discovery is intertwined with the history of cancer research and the history of virology. The oldest surviving record of a human cancer is the Babylonian Code of Hammurabi (dated ca. 1754 BC) but scientific oncology could only emerge in the 19th century, when tumors were studied at microscopic level with the help of the compound microscope and achromatic lenses. 19th century microbiology accumulated evidence that implicated bacteria, yeasts, fungi, and protozoa in the development of cancer. In 1926 the Nobel Prize was awarded for documenting that a nematode worm could provoke stomach cancer in rats. But it was not recognized that cancer could have infectious origins until much later as virus had first been discovered by Dmitri Ivanovsky and Martinus Beijerinck at the close of the 19th century.

=== History of non-human oncoviruses ===
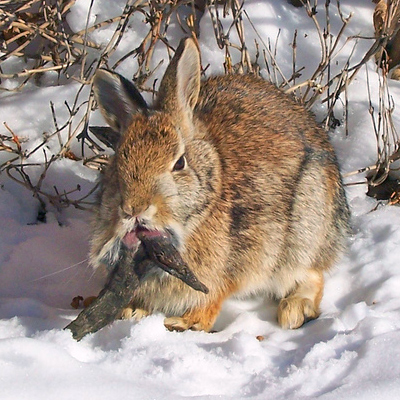
Rabbit with Shope papilloma virus infection

The theory that cancer could be caused by a virus began with the experiments of Oluf Bang and Vilhelm Ellerman in 1908 at the University of Copenhagen. Bang and Ellerman demonstrated that avian sarcoma leukosis virus could be transmitted between chickens after cell-free filtration and subsequently cause leukemia. This was subsequently confirmed for solid tumors in chickens in 1910–1911 by Peyton Rous. Rous at the Rockefeller University extended Bang and Ellerman's experiments to show cell-free transmission of a solid tumor sarcoma to chickens (now known as Rous sarcoma). The reasons why chickens are so receptive to such transmission may involve unusual characteristics of stability or instability as they relate to endogenous retroviruses. Charlotte Friend confirmed Bang and Ellerman findings for liquid tumor in mice by . In 1933 Richard Shope and Edward Weston Hurst showed that warts from wild cottontail rabbits contained the Shope papilloma virus. In 1936 John Joseph Bittner identified the mouse mammary tumor virus, an "extrachromosomal factor" (i.e. virus) that could be transmitted between laboratory strains of mice by breast feeding.

By the early 1950s, it was known that viruses could remove and incorporate genes and genetic material in cells. It was suggested that such types of viruses could cause cancer by introducing new genes into the genome. Genetic analysis of mice infected with Friend virus confirmed that retroviral integration could disrupt tumor suppressor genes, causing cancer. Viral oncogenes were subsequently discovered and identified to cause cancer. Ludwik Gross identified the first mouse leukemia virus (murine leukemia virus) in 1951 and in 1953 reported on a component of mouse leukemia extract capable of causing solid tumors in mice. This compound was subsequently identified as a virus by Sarah Stewart and Bernice Eddy at the National Cancer Institute, after whom it was once called "SE polyoma". In 1957 Charlotte Friend discovered the Friend virus, a strain of murine leukemia virus capable of causing cancers in immunocompetent mice. Though her findings received significant backlash, they were eventually accepted by the field and cemented the validity of viral oncogenesis.

In 1961 Eddy discovered the simian vacuolating virus 40 (SV40). Merck Laboratory also confirmed the existence of a rhesus macaque virus contaminating cells used to make Salk and Sabin polio vaccines. Several years later, it was shown to cause cancer in Syrian hamsters, raising concern about possible human health implications. Scientific consensus now strongly agrees that this is not likely to cause human cancer.

=== History of human oncoviruses ===
In 1964 Anthony Epstein, Bert Achong and Yvonne Barr identified the first human oncovirus from Burkitt's lymphoma cells. A herpesvirus, this virus is formally known as human herpesvirus 4 but more commonly called Epstein–Barr virus or EBV. In the mid-1960s Baruch Blumberg first physically isolated and characterized Hepatitis B while working at the National Institute of Health (NIH) and later the Fox Chase Cancer Center. Although this agent was the clear cause of hepatitis and might contribute to liver cancer hepatocellular carcinoma, this link was not firmly established until epidemiologic studies were performed in the 1980s by R. Palmer Beasley and others.

In 1980 the first human retrovirus, Human T-lymphotropic virus 1 (HTLV-I), was discovered by Bernard Poiesz and Robert Gallo at NIH, and independently by Mitsuaki Yoshida and coworkers in Japan. But it was not certain whether HTLV-I promoted leukemia. In 1981 Yorio Hinuma and his colleagues at Kyoto University reported visualization of retroviral particles produced by a leukemia cell line derived from patients with Adult T-cell leukemia/lymphoma. This virus turned out to be HTLV-1 and the research established the causal role of the HTLV-1 virus to ATL.

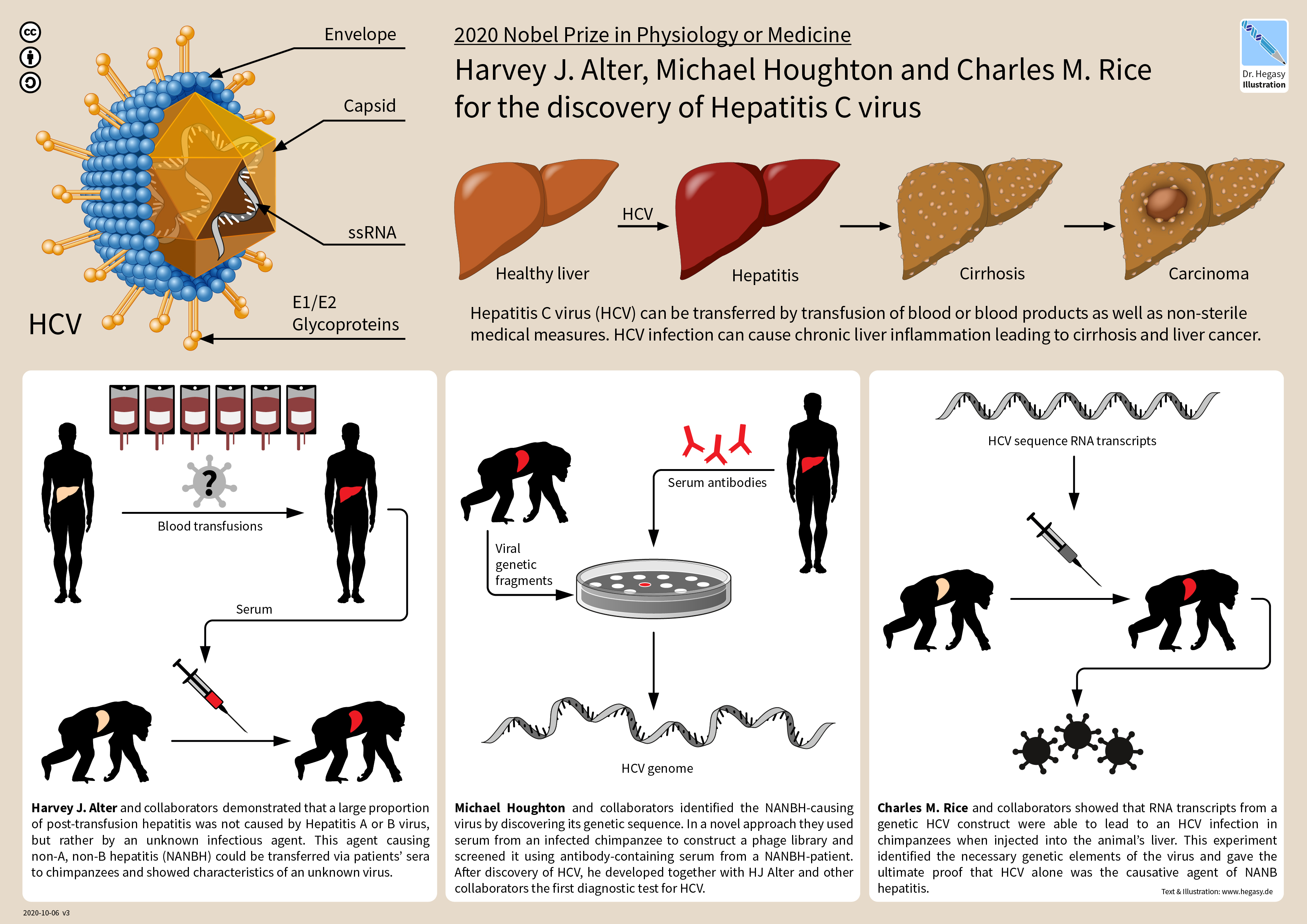
Nobel Prize in Physiology or Medicine 2020: Seminal experiments by Harvey J. Alter, Michael Houghton and Charles M. Rice leading to the discovery of HCV as the causative agent of non-A, non-B hepatitis.

Between 1984 and 1986 Harald zur Hausen and Lutz Gissmann discovered HPV16 and HPV18, together these Papillomaviridae viruses (HPV) are responsible for approximately 70% of human papillomavirus infections that cause cervical cancers. For the discovery that HPV cause human cancer the 2008 Nobel Prize was awarded. In 1987 the Hepatitis C virus (HCV) was discovered by panning a cDNA library made from diseased tissues for foreign antigens recognized by patient sera. This work was performed by Michael Houghton at Chiron, a biotechnology company, and Daniel W. Bradley at the Centers for Disease Control and Prevention (CDC). HCV was subsequently shown to be a major contributor to Hepatocellular carcinoma (liver cancer) worldwide.

In 1994 Patrick S. Moore and Yuan Chang at Columbia University), working together with Ethel Cesarman, isolated Kaposi's sarcoma-associated herpesvirus (KSHV or HHV8) using representational difference analysis. This search was prompted by work from Valerie Beral and colleagues who inferred from the epidemic of Kaposi's sarcoma among patients with AIDS that this cancer must be caused by another infectious agent besides HIV, and that this was likely to be a second virus. Subsequent studies revealed that KSHV is the "KS agent" and is responsible for the epidemiologic patterns of KS and related cancers.

In 2008 Yuan Chang and Patrick S. Moore developed a new method to identify cancer viruses based on computer subtraction of human sequences from a tumor transcriptome, called digital transcriptome subtraction (DTS). DTS was used to isolate DNA fragments of Merkel cell polyomavirus from a Merkel cell carcinoma and it is now believed that this virus causes 70–80% of these cancers.

== See also ==
- Infectious causes of cancer
- Carcinogen
- Oncogenic
- Oncogene
- Adult T-cell leukemia/lymphoma
- Cancer bacteria
- Oncolytic virus, a virus that infects and kills cancer cells
- Gag-onc fusion protein
- List of infectious diseases
- Chronic diseases and cancers linked to infectious microbes
