= Kidamycin =

Names
- Other names Rubiflavin B

Identifiers
CAS Number	11072-82-5
3D model (JSmol)	Interactive image
ChEMBL	ChEMBL1988097
ChemSpider	4514106
PubChem CID	5359060
UNII	E59M3D67RY
- InChI: InChI=1S/C39H48N2O9/c1-11-17(2)26-15-25(42)29-18(3)12-23-31(37(29)50-26)36(46)32-30(35(23)45)21(27-14-24(40(7)8)33(43)19(4)48-27)13-22(34(32)44)28-16-39(6,41(9)10)38(47)20(5)49-28/h11-13,15,19-20,24,27-28,33,38,43-44,47H,14,16H2,1-10H3/b17-11+ Key: MFTJRTUKCOVIMD-GZTJUZNOSA-N
- SMILES: C/C=C(\C)/C1=CC(=O)C2=C(O1)C3=C(C=C2C)C(=O)C4=C(C3=O)C(=C(C=C4C5CC(C(C(O5)C)O)N(C)C)C6CC(C(C(O6)C)O)(C)N(C)C)

Properties
Chemical formula	C_{39}H_{48}N_{2}O_{9}
Molar mass	688.818 g·mol^{−1}
- Except where otherwise noted, data are given for materials in their standard state (at 25 °C [77 °F], 100 kPa). Infobox references

Kidamycin is an anthracycline antibiotic with anticancer activity. It was first synthesized from a strain of streptomyces bacteria isolated from a soil sample. In clinical trials, Kindamycin showed high effect against gram positive bacteria as well as multiple cancer models including Ehrlich ascites carcinoma, Sarcoma 180, NF-sarcoma, and Yoshida sarcoma.
