= Boston Society of Film Critics =

Organization of film reviewers

The Boston Society of Film Critics (BSFC) is an organization of film reviewers in Boston, Massachusetts.

== History ==
The BSFC was formed in 1981 as a society of film critics in the New England area. It was founded to make "Boston’s unique critical perspective heard on a national and international level by awarding commendations to the best of the year’s films and filmmakers and local film theaters and film societies that offer outstanding film programming."

Every year for the past three decades, the Boston Society of Film Critics give their Boston Society of Film Critics Awards. The 2009 award for best picture and best director went to The Hurt Locker directed by Kathryn Bigelow and also won three other awards (best actor, best cinematography and best film editing). It was the first time in the organization's thirty-year history that one film took home five awards.

The New Filmmaker award is named for David Brudnoy, Boston-area radio talk show host and film critic, who was a founding member of the BSFC; he died in 2004. Winners include Joe Wright (Pride and Prejudice), Ryan Fleck (Half Nelson) and Florian Zeller (The Father).

== Categories ==
- Best Actor
- Best Actress
- Best Cast
- Best Cinematography
- Best Director
- Best Editing
- Best Film
- Best Foreign Language Film
- Best New Filmmaker
- Best Screenplay^{[A]}
- Best Supporting Actor
- Best Supporting Actress
- Best Use of Music in a Film
- Best Animated Film

== Notes ==
^A: The Society does not distinguish between original screenplays and adaptation for their Best Screenplay award.
