= Charlotte Friend =

American virologist (1921–1987)

- Born: March 11, 1921; New York City, New York
- Died: January 13, 1987 (aged 65); New York, New York
- Education: Hunter College, Yale
- Known for: Discovery of the Friend Leukemia Virus and Friend erythroleukemia cells, her research is still widely used today. It has become especially important in the field of HIV/AIDS research following her death.
- Scientific career
- Fields: Virology
- Workplaces: New York University, Sloan-Kettering Institute for Cancer Research, Icahn School of Medicine

Charlotte Friend (March 11, 1921 – January 13, 1987) was an American virologist. She is best known for her discovery of the Friend leukemia virus. She helped to establish the concept of the oncovirus, studied the role of the host immune response in disease development, and helped define modern retrovirology.

== Biography ==
=== Family ===
Born and raised in New York, she was the youngest daughter of Russian Jewish immigrants, Morris Friend, a businessman, and Cecilia (Wolpin) Friend, a pharmacist. Friend had three siblings, two older sisters, Priscilla and Leafan, and a younger brother, Morris. When she was three years old, her father died, leaving her mother alone to raise four children during the Great Depression. Her mother made sure all four of her children completed their education, despite living on "Home Relief".

=== Education and research ===
She graduated from Hunter High School in 1940 and Hunter College in 1944. That same year, she enlisted in the United States Navy. As a lieutenant junior grade she worked in the hematology laboratory at U.S. Naval Hospital Shoemaker, California. After the war ended she enrolled as a graduate student in the Department of Microbiology at Yale, where she received her PhD in 1950 with a thesis on the effects of sodium salicylate (aspirin) on antigen-antibody reactions During her time at Yale she frequently traveled to New York to consult with Elvin Kabat and Michael Heidelberger, eminent immunologists at Columbia. As a post-doc she worked at the Sloan-Kettering Institute under the direction of Cornelius P. Rhoads. While at Sloan-Kettering, she met Cecily Cannan Selby, who had recently earned her Ph.D. from the Massachusetts Institute of Technology. Both scientists were interested in cell structure. Once, when looking through an unused electron microscope at the university, they decided to look at fine structures within the cells of the Ehrlich ascites carcinoma, a commonly used model for cancer research. What they found were structures in the cytoplasm of the cells which resembled those found in virus-infested cells. It was this incident that sparked Friend's interest in the possibility of cancer being caused by viruses, which became a main focus of her research. In 1966 she accepted a position as professor and director of the Center for Experimental Cell Biology at The Mount Sinai Hospital.

At various times, she was president of the Harvey Society (1978-79), the American Association for Cancer Research (1975-76) and the New York Academy of Sciences (1978), and was the first woman to do so. In 1998, the American Association for Cancer Research established the AACR-Women in Cancer Research Charlotte Friend Lectureship in her honor to recognize scientists who have made significant contributions to cancer research and advanced the role of women in science. Charlotte Friend also served as a member of the Advisory Committee for the Virus Cancer Program of the National Institutes of Health and a member of the Board of Scientific Counselors of the Division of Cancer Cause and Prevention of the National Cancer Institute. Over the years, she served on a number of other advisory committees and on the editorial boards of several cancer and hematology journals. In all, she published 163 papers, 70 of which she wrote by herself or with one other author.

On her sixtieth birthday she was diagnosed with a lymphoma. She was insistent that her diagnosis remain secret, and continued to carry out her duties in her laboratory. She died in 1987 at the age of 65.

== Legacy ==
- Cemented the knowledge that virus can be responsible for some types of cancer.
- Friend Virus is today the model to study viral leukemogenesis
- Helped set the foundations for the study of retrovirus. Her techniques and characterisation studies allowed the future isolation of the human immunodeficiency virus.
- Observed the relation between liver cell damage and virus release and elevation of enzyme levels. Furthermore, she detected that increases in serum enzymes are also a feature of some human leukaemia, both still of vital clinical relevance today.
- Observed the cytodifferentiating effect of DMSO which laid the groundwork for the development of HDAC inhibitors

== Prize and Honors ==
- 1962 Alfred P. Sloan Award in Cancer Research
- 1979 Leopold Griffuel Prize
- 1979 U.S. National Academy of Sciences
- 1986 Honorary Doctor of Science, Brandeis University

== Selected works ==
- “Cell-Free Transmission in Adult Swiss Mice of a Disease Having the Character of a Leukemia.” Journal of Experimental Medicine 105 (1957): 307–318
- “The Coming of Age of Tumor Virology.” Cancer Research 37 (1977): 1255–1263
- “Hemoglobin Synthesis in Murine Virus-induced Leukemic Cells in Vitro: Stimulation of Erythroid Differentiation by Dimethyl Sulfoxide,” with W. Scher, J.G. Holland, and T. Sato. Proceedings of the National Academy of Sciences 68 (1971): 378–382.
