= Patrick S. Moore =

American virologist and epidemiologist

Patrick Moore
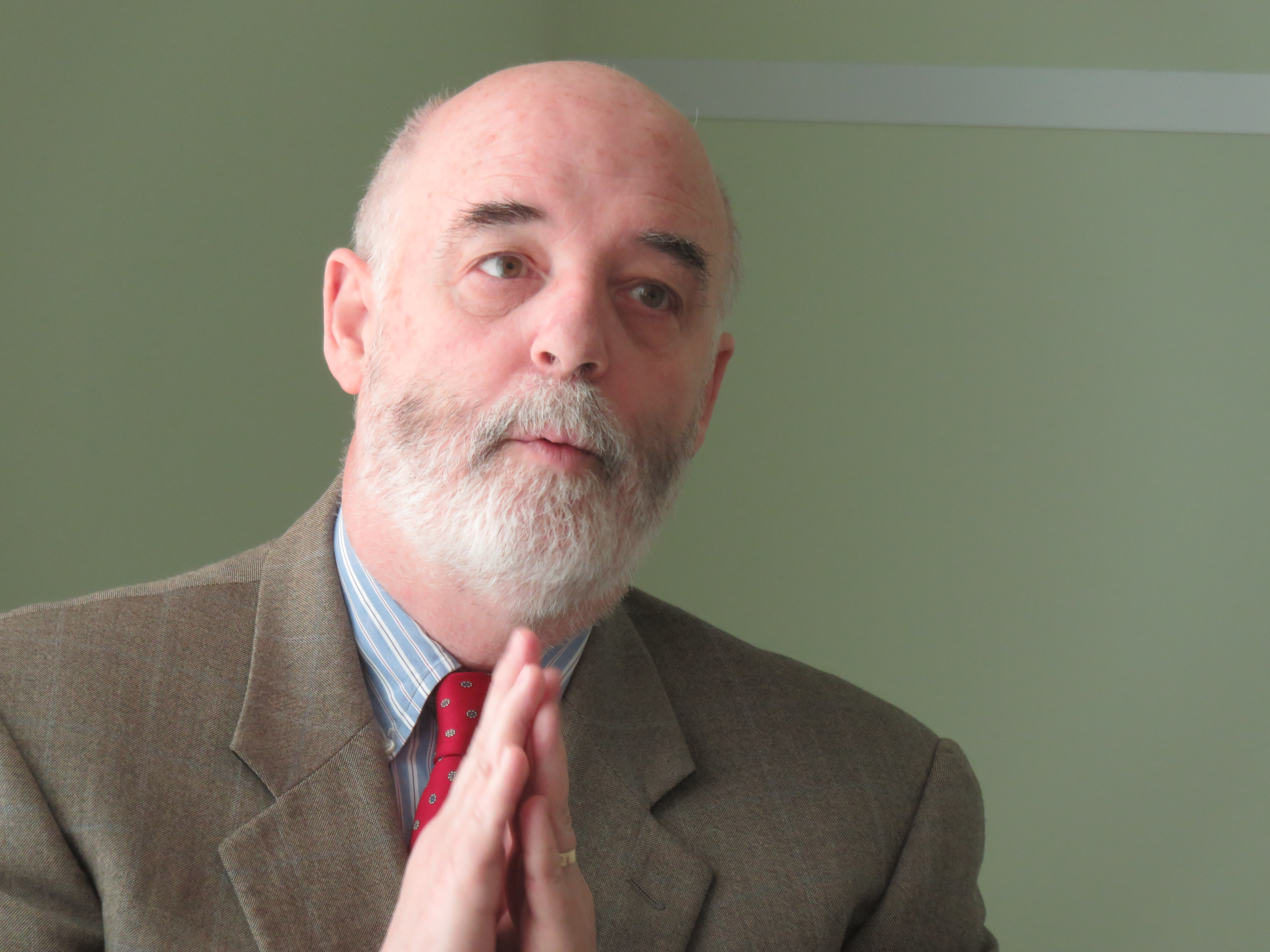
- Moore in 2017
- Born: October 21, 1956 (age 69); Seattle, Washington, U.S.
- Education: Westminster College; Stanford University; University of Utah; University of California, Berkeley
- Known for: Discovery of the human cancer viruses KSHV and MCV
- Spouse: Yuan Chang
- Awards: Meyenburg Prize (1997); Robert Koch Prize (1998); Charles S. Mott Prize (2003); Passano Award (2017); Paul Ehrlich and Ludwig Darmstaedter Prize (2017); Clarivate Citation Laureates (2017)
- Scientific career
- Fields: Cancer, Microbiology, Epidemiology
- Workplaces: UPMC Hillman Cancer Center University of Pittsburgh

Patrick S. Moore (born October 21, 1956) is an Irish and American virologist and epidemiologist who co-discovered together with his wife, Yuan Chang, two different human viruses causing the AIDS-related cancer Kaposi's sarcoma and the skin cancer Merkel cell carcinoma. Moore and Chang have discovered two of the seven known human viruses causing cancer. The couple met while in medical school together and were married in 1989 while they pursued fellowships at different universities.

== Education and career ==
Moore received a Bachelor of Science in chemistry and biology from Westminster College in Salt Lake City, an M.S. degree from Stanford University, and M.D. and MPhil degrees from the University of Utah, and an M.P.H. degree from the University of California, Berkeley. As an epidemiologist working at the US Centers for Disease Control and Prevention (CDC), he developed widely used international guidelines to control meningococcal meningitis epidemics and led a team of CDC epidemiologists during the 1992 Somali Civil War. Civilian death rates documented during this civil war-famine were among the highest ever reported. The extreme mortality statistics helped to solidify international support behind the US-led military intervention Operation Restore Hope. He received the 1989 CDC Langmuir Prize for his work on epidemic meningitis control.

After leaving the CDC, Moore served briefly as a New York City epidemiologist but quit to search for new human viruses with his wife, Yuan Chang who was then a newly appointed assistant professor at Columbia University. Unemployed, he worked in his wife's laboratory, allowing him to rapidly pick up training in molecular biology. Despite having no research funding, Moore and Chang used a new molecular biology technique, representational difference analysis, to search for a virus causing Kaposi's sarcoma, the most common malignancy among AIDS patients. In 1994, they discovered a new human herpesvirus, KSHV, in a KS tumor and along with several collaborators showed that it was the etiologic agent of Kaposi's sarcoma, primary effusion lymphoma, and some forms of multicentric Castleman's disease. Moore was hired onto the faculty at Columbia and the Chang-Moore Laboratory secured research funding to investigate this new virus. They subsequently sequenced KSHV, identified oncogenes encoded by the virus, demonstrated transmission during transplantation and developed diagnostic tests to detect infection. In 2002, he moved his laboratory to the University of Pittsburgh where he served as founding director of the Cancer Virology Program at the UPMC Hillman Cancer Centerr until 2018. Chang and Moore jointly developed a new technique to find human tumor viruses called digital transcriptome subtraction (DTS). Using this approach, they identified the most recently discovered cancer virus, a new human polyomavirus infecting Merkel carcinoma cells in 2008. This virus causes of 50-80% of Merkel cell carcinomas and hence is named Merkel cell polyomavirus. His laboratory currently seeks to understand the role of tumor virus immunoevasion of the innate immune system as a cause for viral tumorigenesis. They have also discovered another polyomavirus (Human polyomavirus 7) as a cause of skin disease in transplant patients, the generation of viral circular RNAs in KSHV, EBV and MCV, the role of CDK1 in controlling protein translation during mitosis and they defined the clonal mutation pattern of Merkel cell polyomavirus in cancers as well as its oncogenes.

== Awards ==
- Moore and Chang are American Cancer Society Research Professors and have been awarded the 1997 Meyenburg Cancer Research Prize, 1998 Robert Koch Prize, the 2003 General Motors Cancer Research Foundation Charles S. Mott Prize, the 2017 Paul Ehrlich and Ludwig Darmstaedter Prize and the 2017 Passano Foundation Passano Award. They are 2017 Clarivate Citation Laureates.
