= Keratin 20 =

Protein found in humans

KRT20

Identifiers
- Aliases: KRT20, CD20, CK-20, CK20, K20, KRT21, keratin 20
- External IDs: OMIM: 608218; MGI: 1914059; GeneCards: KRT20

Gene location (Human)
Chr.	Chromosome 17 (human)
Band	17q21.2	Start	40,875,889 bp
Band	17q21.2	End	40,885,242 bp

Gene location (Mouse)
Chr.	Chromosome 11 (mouse)
Band	11|11 D	Start	99,319,229 bp
Band	11|11 D	End	99,328,976 bp
RNA expression pattern
Bgee	Human / Mouse (ortholog); Top expressed in: mucosa of transverse colon; rectum; duodenum; appendix; epithelium of colon; gastric mucosa; smooth muscle tissue; body of stomach; urinary bladder; muscle layer of sigmoid colon / Top expressed in: intestinal villus; Ileal epithelium; large intestine; colon; duodenum; left colon; mucous cell of stomach; pyloric antrum; Paneth cell; jejunum; More reference expression data
BioGPS	n/a
Gene ontology
Molecular function	structural molecule activity; protein binding; structural constituent of cytoskeleton
Cellular component	cytoplasm; intermediate filament; cytosol
Biological process	intermediate filament organization; apoptotic process; regulation of protein secretion; keratinization; cornification; cellular response to starvation
Sources:Amigo / QuickGO
Orthologs
Databases	NCBI: entry; OMA: entry
Species	Human	Mouse
Entrez	54474	66809
Ensembl	ENSG00000171431; ENSG00000263057	ENSMUSG00000035775
UniProt	P35900	Q9D312
RefSeq (mRNA)	NM_019010	NM_023256
RefSeq (protein)	NP_061883	NP_075745
Location (UCSC)	Chr 17: 40.88 – 40.89 Mb	Chr 11: 99.32 – 99.33 Mb
PubMed search
- Wikidata
View/Edit Human	View/Edit Mouse

Keratin 20, often abbreviated CK20, is a protein that in humans is encoded by the KRT20 gene.

Keratin 20 is a type I cytokeratin. It is a major cellular protein of mature enterocytes and goblet cells and is specifically found in the gastric and intestinal mucosa.

In immunohistochemistry, antibodies to CK20 can be used to identify a range of adenocarcinoma arising from epithelia that normally contain the CK20 protein. For example, the protein is commonly found in colorectal cancer, transitional cell carcinomas and in Merkel cell carcinoma, but is absent in lung cancer, prostate cancer, and non-mucinous ovarian cancer. It is often used in combination with antibodies to CK7 to distinguish different types of glandular tumour.

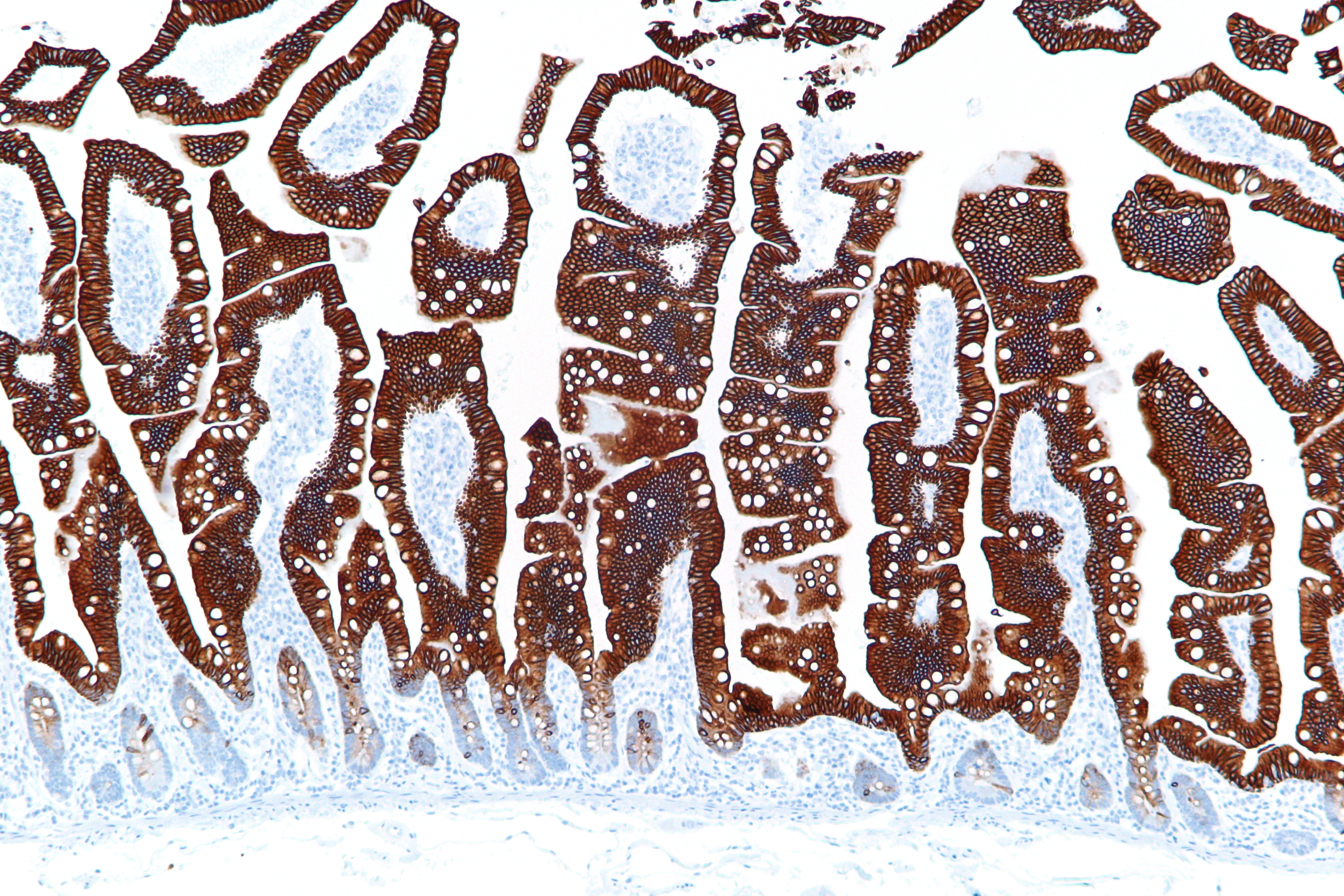
Micrograph showing CK20 immunostaining of normal small intestine.

CK7 and CK20 expression by various body locations.
