= Merkel cell polyomavirus =

Virus classification
- (unranked): Virus
- Realm: Monodnaviria
- Kingdom: Shotokuvirae
- Phylum: Cossaviricota
- Class: Papovaviricetes
- Order: Sepolyvirales
- Family: Polyomaviridae
- Genus: Alphapolyomavirus
- Species: Alphapolyomavirus quintihominis

Synonyms
- Human polyomavirus 5

Species of virus

Merkel cell polyomavirus (MCV or MCPyV) is one of seven currently known human oncoviruses. It is suspected to cause the majority of cases of Merkel cell carcinoma, a rare but aggressive form of skin cancer. It was the first example of a human viral pathogen discovered using unbiased metagenomic next-generation sequencing with a technique called digital transcriptome subtraction by a team at the University of Pittsburgh Cancer Institute in 2008.

Approximately 80% of Merkel cell carcinoma (MCC) tumors have been found to be infected with MCV. MCV appears to be a common—if not universal—infection of older children and adults. It is found in respiratory secretions, suggesting that it might be transmitted via a respiratory route. However, it has also been found elsewhere, such as in shed healthy skin and gastrointestinal tract tissues, thus its precise mode of transmission remains unknown. In addition, recent studies suggest that this virus may latently infect the human sera and peripheral blood mononuclear cells.

Most MCV viruses found in MCC tumors, however, have at least two mutations that render the virus nontransmissible: 1) The virus is integrated into the host genome and 2) The viral T antigen has truncation mutations that leave the T antigen unable to initiate DNA replication needed to propagate the virus.

Evidence that MCV is the cause for most MCC tumors comes from studies in which T antigen oncoproteins from the virus are inhibited. Knockdown of these viral proteins causes cells from MCV-positive MCC tumors to die whereas there is no effect on cells from tumors that are uninfected with the virus. This indicates that MCV is necessary to maintain the virus-positive tumor cells. Further, clonal pattern of MCV insertions into MCC cell genomes indicates that the virus was present in the Merkel cell before it underwent cancerous transformation. The IARC has recently classified MCV as a Group 1 carcinogen.

== Classification ==
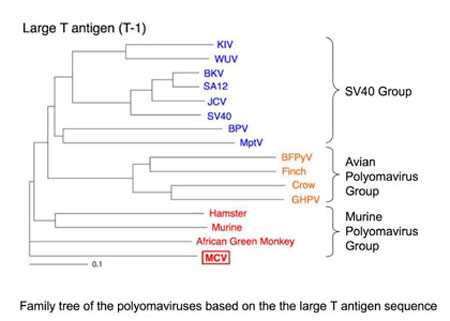
Family tree of the polyomaviruses, based on large T antigen sequence

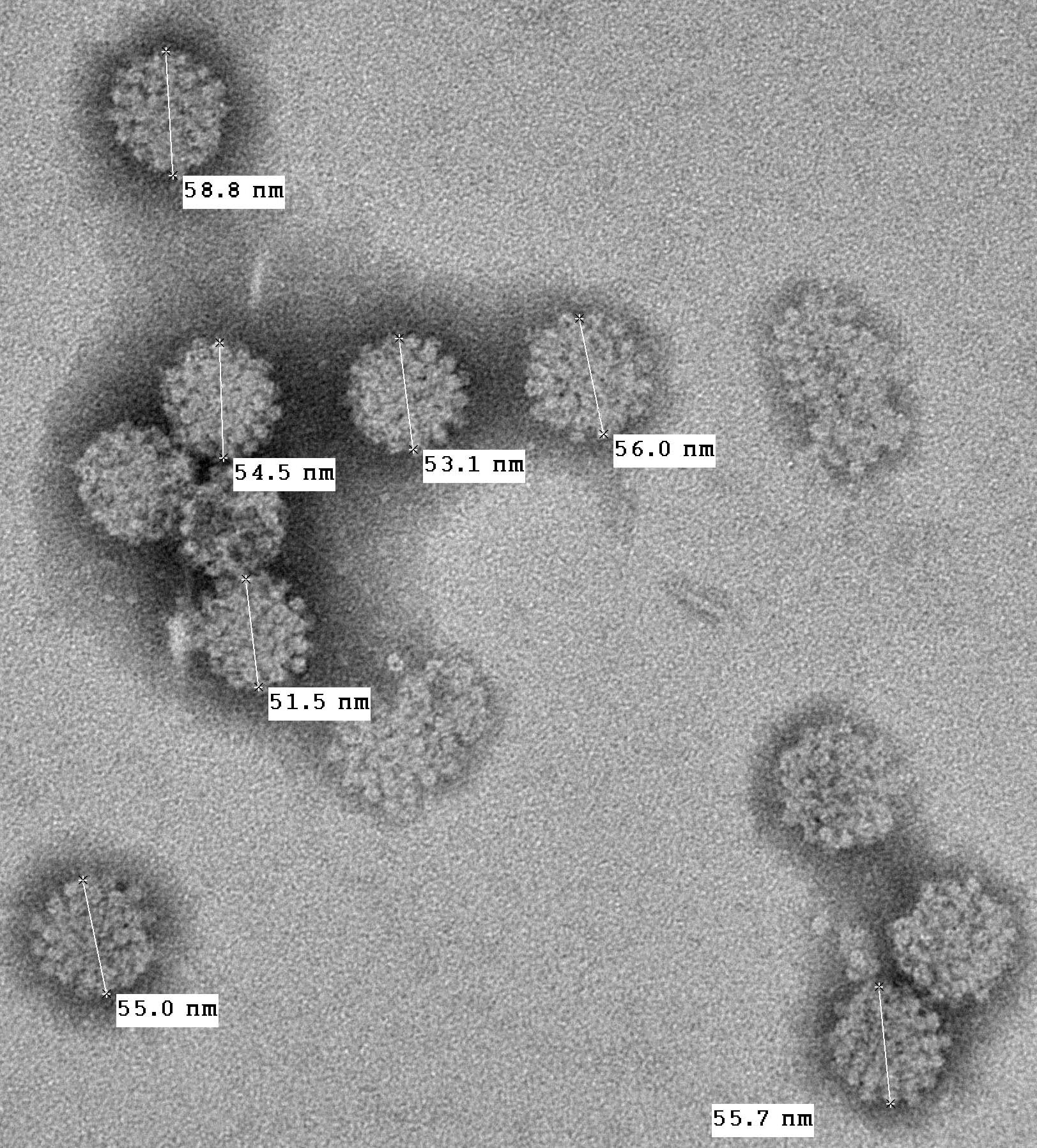
Electron microphotograph (x50,000) of MCV capsids artificially produced as virus-like particles by expressing MCV structural proteins in cells. The 55–60 nm viral capsids have typical icosahedral symmetry found in polyomaviruses.

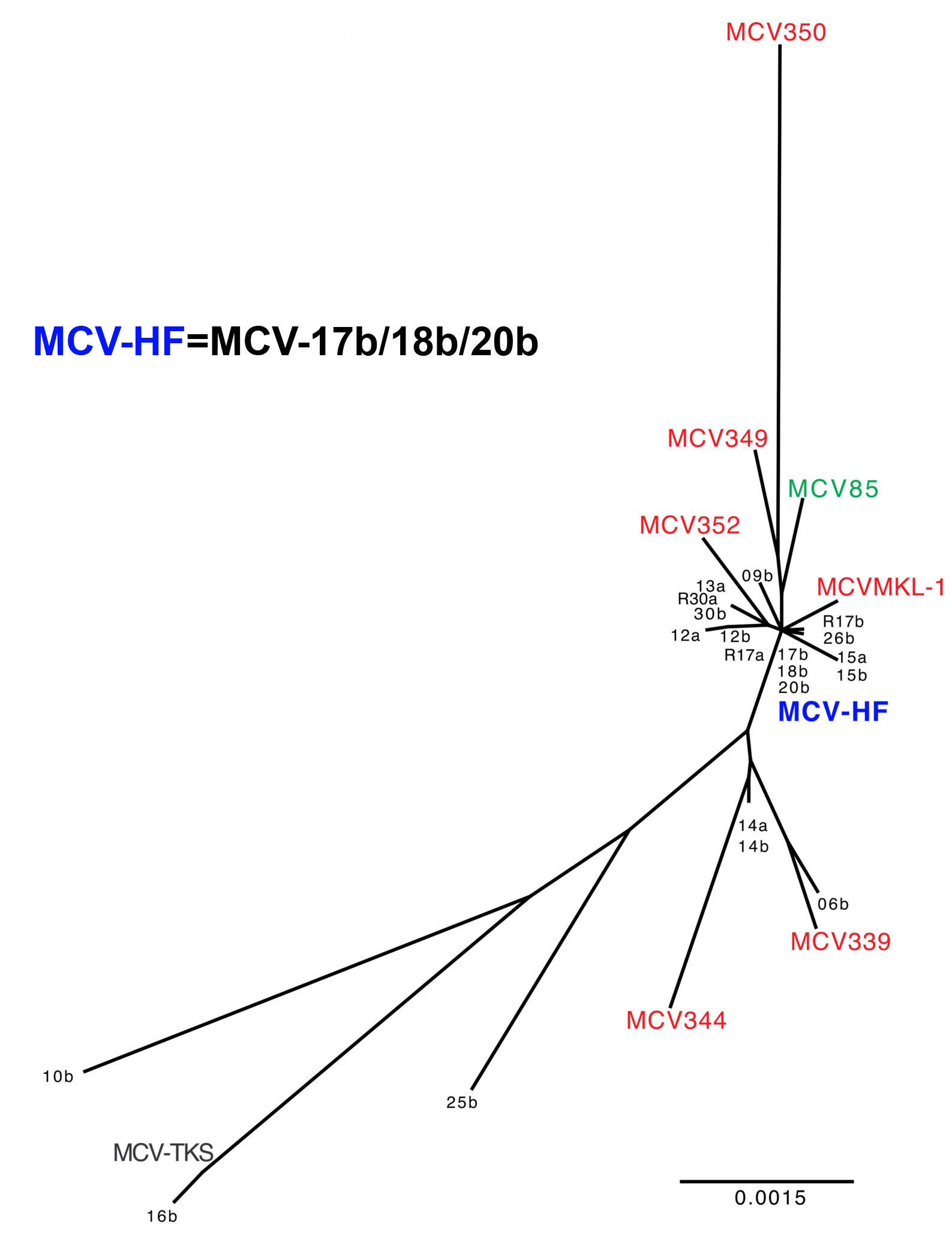
A complete MCV genome was designed from multiple Merkel Cell carcinoma tumors and normal human tissues.

Polyomaviruses are small (~5400 base pair), non-enveloped, double-stranded DNA viruses. MCV is the fifth polyomavirus that infects humans to be discovered. It belongs to the murine polyomavirus group, one of the three main clades of polyomaviruses. (The group is named for murine polyomavirus, the earliest virus of the group to be discovered, and does not imply that MCV is transmitted to humans from rodents.) Although it has been confused with the controversial SV40 virus in some blog postings, it is a distinct virus.

MCV is genetically most closely related to the African green monkey lymphotropic polyomavirus (formerly known as African green monkey lymphotropic papovavirus), which is consistent with MCV coevolving with human primates.

The prototype sequence of MCV has a 5387 base pair double-stranded DNA (dsDNA) genome and encodes characteristic polyomavirus genes from opposite strands including a large T antigen, a small T antigen (LT and sT, respectively, from early strand) and viral capsid proteins VP1 and VP2/3 genes (from late strand) Our Viruses - MCV. MCV T antigen has similar features to the T antigens of other polyomaviruses, which are known oncoproteins, and is expressed in human tumors. The T antigen is a spliced gene that forms multiple different proteins depending on the splicing pattern. Both large T and small T oncoproteins are probably needed to transform healthy cells into cancer cells, and they act by targeting tumor suppressor proteins, such as retinoblastoma protein. The LT antigen possesses a helicase motif needed for virus replication that is deleted in MCC tumors. Unlike for other polyomaviruses, MCV sT antigen transforms cells in vitro by activating cap-dependent translation.

MCV also expresses a microRNA (miRNA) known as MCV-miR-M1 from its late strand which bears perfect complementarity to LT and has been shown to negatively regulate LT expression . In addition to its role in regulating MCV LT expression and DNA replication, MCV-miR-M1 has been shown to directly target and downregulate the expression of host cell immune related transcript SP100 and its role in the establishment of long-term persistent infection has been demonstrated in vitro.

== Viral cause for Merkel cell carcinoma ==
Merkel cell carcinoma is a highly aggressive type of skin cancer that was first described by Cyril Toker in 1972 as "trabecular tumor of the skin". Based on its origin, the cancer cell type is called a neuroectodermal tumor. Although rare compared with other skin cancers, the incidence of Merkel cell carcinoma in the United States tripled between 1986 and 2001, to around 1400 cases per year.

Merkel cell carcinoma is mainly seen in older individuals. It is known to occur at increased frequency in people with immunodeficiency, including transplant recipients and people with AIDS, and this association suggests the possibility that a virus or other infectious agent might be involved in causing the cancer. Kaposi's sarcoma and Burkitt's lymphoma are examples of tumors known to have a viral etiology that occur at increased frequency in immunosuppressed people. Other factors associated with the development of this cancer include exposure to ultraviolet light.

Eight of 10 Merkel cell carcinoma tumors initially tested were found to be infected with MCV. In these tumors, the virus has integrated into the cancer cell genome and can no longer freely replicate. Recent studies from other laboratories have reproduced these findings: in one study 30 of 39 (77%) of Merkel cell tumors were MCV positive; in another study, 45 of 53 (85%) Merkel cell tumors were positive.

Sequencing of the virus from Merkel cell cancers reveals that it generally has tumor-specific mutations that truncate the MCV T antigen. These mutations (which are not found in native virus obtained from nontumor sites) eliminate the T antigen helicase, preventing the integrated virus from replicating independently from the host cancer cell. The tumor is therefore a "dead-end host" for MCV. Normally, the virus exists as circular episome (or plasmid) within the cell and its DNA is packaged into viral capsids and transmitted to other cells. In tumors, the viral DNA has broken and become integrated into human DNA within the tumor, so that the virus is no longer transmissible. The integrated virus cannot be excised from the host cell and it must replicate as the host cell is replicated. Examination of infected tumors reveals that the majority have a clear monoclonal pattern, indicating that the virus integrated into a single cell before it began its cancerous expansion. For this reason, there is very strong evidence that MCV causes some, but not all, Merkel cell carcinomas. MCV can also be found in healthy tissues from people without Merkel cell carcinoma. A complete MCV genome (MCV-HF) was designed from multiple tumor-type MCV genomes and examined with successful replication capability in vitro. The identical sequences were found in human normal skins. While the precise prevalence of infection is unknown in humans, it is likely that most infections do not cause cancers.

== Prevention, diagnosis, and treatment ==
Persons who have Merkel cell carcinoma with this virus are not infectious to others and no infectious restrictions are warranted. The reasons for this are: 1) the virus in tumors is already mutated and no longer can be transmitted from tumors, and 2) most persons are already naturally exposed to this virus as children and young adults by other asymptomatic carriers.

Based on current data, prevention advice for MCC is similar to other skin cancers, such as avoiding sunburns and unnecessary sun exposure together with use of sun lotion. This may prevent mutations in the virus that increase risk for MCC among those already infected with MCV. Persons with immunosuppression (e.g., AIDS or organ transplant patients) are at higher risk for this cancer and may benefit from periodic skin examinations. Emergence of a painless lump that expands rapidly, especially among persons over age 50 or persons with immunosuppression, warrants examination by a physician. Biopsy of a Merkel cell tumor should readily provide a diagnosis and when caught early, has a good prognosis through standard treatment. At this time there are no vaccines or medications that can prevent MCV infection or prevent emergence of Merkel cell carcinoma.

Detection of the virus is still at a research phase and is generally not available as a clinical test. Detection of viral DNA is performed by PCR or by Southern blot. Caution is needed in interpreting results from PCR since it is prone to false-positive contamination and a substantial fraction of healthy skin samples may harbor low-level infection. Sequencing of the viral genome may determine whether or not tumor-specific mutations are present.

Antibodies have been developed to stain for T antigen in tumor tissues and appear to be specific for MCV-infected tumor cells. Blood tests have also been developed that show the majority of adults have been previously exposed to MCV and may continue to carry it as an asymptomatic infection.

Treatment guidelines do not differ for Merkel cell carcinoma infected with MCV or without MCV. A recent country-wide study from Finland suggests that MCV-positive tumors have a better prognosis than uninfected tumors (although this has not been found in other studies). If this is confirmed, routine detection of the virus may provide a future benefit for medical guidance. The virus itself is not known to be susceptible to current antiviral medications.

Recent studies reveal that the survivin oncoprotein is activated by MCV large T protein targeting the cellular retinoblastoma protein and that survivin inhibitors can delay tumor progression in animal models. Clinical trials are now being organized to determine whether this has any benefit in humans. The importance of this finding is that a promising rational drug target was uncovered within four years of the initial discovery of the virus and that other new treatments might be rapidly developed now that the cause of the cancer is known. MCV is a target for cell-mediated immune responses, and so important research efforts are being focused on immunologic therapies that may benefit MCC patients.

== Discovery and characterization ==
Yuan Chang and Patrick S. Moore discovered Kaposi's sarcoma-associated herpesvirus by a physical subtraction method in 1994. A virtual subtraction method was developed by Huichen Feng in the lab as a novel high-throughput sequencing technique of digital transcriptome subtraction (DTS)New Pathogen Discovery to search for the presence of a virus in Merkel cell tumors. In this method, all mRNAs from a tumor are converted into cDNAs and sequenced to a depth likely to sequence a viral cDNA if it is present. The sequences are then compared with the human genome and all human sequences are "subtracted" to leave a group of sequences that are most likely nonhuman. When this was performed on four cases of Merkel cell carcinoma, one cDNA was found that was similar to sequences of known polyomaviruses but clearly distinct enough that it could be shown to be a new virus. Genetic sequences from nearly 400,000 mRNAs were analyzed for the study. Once the virus was found, Feng and coworkers quickly determined that infected Merkel cell carcinomas have the virus in an integrated monoclonal pattern and 80% of tissues taken from patients with MCC were positive for the virus. This was quickly confirmed by studies of MCC patients from around the world, including evidence for monoclonal integration of the virus in these tumors.

== As a cause for Merkel cell carcinoma ==
While the original authors conservatively noted that it is "too early to tell" whether MCV is a cause of Merkel cell carcinoma, general scientific opinion now suggests that the virus causes most, but not all Merkel cell tumors. The virus is monoclonally integrated into the tumor when present, indicating that the proto-tumor cell was infected with the virus prior to its cancerous expansion. Mutations in the T antigen render the virus noninfectious, and therefore it is not a passenger virus that infected the tumor after the tumor had already started. Finally, the T antigen oncogene is expressed in all of the tumor cells and when it is inhibited ("knocked down" by RNAi), MCV-positive cells die. Thus, the virus is required for MCV-positive tumors to grow. It is likely that additional host cell mutations act in concert with the integrated virus to actually cause the tumor. Merkel cell carcinoma is associated with exposure to ultraviolet (UV) light and to ionizing radiation, and it is likely that these mutagens increase the rate of mutation in either the virus or the Merkel cell genome, contributing to the risk for cancer after infection.

The reasons why 20% of Merkel cell carcinoma are negative for the virus remain completely unknown but speculations include the possibility that "Merkel cell carcinoma" is actually two or more closely related cancers, only one of which is infected with MCV. Misdiagnosis of this difficult cancer may also account for some of the negative results. Only a very small proportion of people infected with MCV develop the cancer. At this time no test for the presence of the virus is generally available, nor would patients be advised to change their treatment based on knowledge of MCV infection status. MCC patients can be enrolled in research studies, but these are not likely to directly benefit participants. Reducing risk of UV exposure through sun screens is likely to reduce the risk of Merkel cell carcinoma as well as other skin cancers.

Moore has suggested that if his findings are confirmed, information about the virus could lead to a blood test or a vaccine that could improve the management of the disease or aid in prevention, much as the human papillomavirus vaccine can be used to prevent cervical cancer. Chang explained that study of the virus may assist in understanding other human cancers. "Once the virus integrates, it could express an oncoprotein, or it could knock out a gene that suppresses tumor growth. Either way, the results are bound to be interesting."

== Other associations ==
Possible associations with cervical carcinoma, cutaneous squamous cell carcinoma, Bowen's disease, basal cell skin carcinoma, extrapulmonary small cell carcinoma, and EGFR mutation-driven non-small cell lung cancer have been reported.
