= Keratin 7 =

Protein found in humans

KRT7

Identifiers
- Aliases: KRT7, CK7, K2C7, K7, SCL, keratin 7
- External IDs: OMIM: 148059; MGI: 96704; GeneCards: KRT7
Available structures
PDB	Ortholog search: PDBe RCSB
PDB	List of PDB id codes 4XIF

Gene location (Human)
Chr.	Chromosome 12 (human)
Band	12q13.13	Start	52,232,520 bp
Band	12q13.13	End	52,252,186 bp

Gene location (Mouse)
Chr.	Chromosome 15 (mouse)
Band	15 F1- F2|15 56.88 cM	Start	101,308,924 bp
Band	15 F1- F2|15 56.88 cM	End	101,328,194 bp
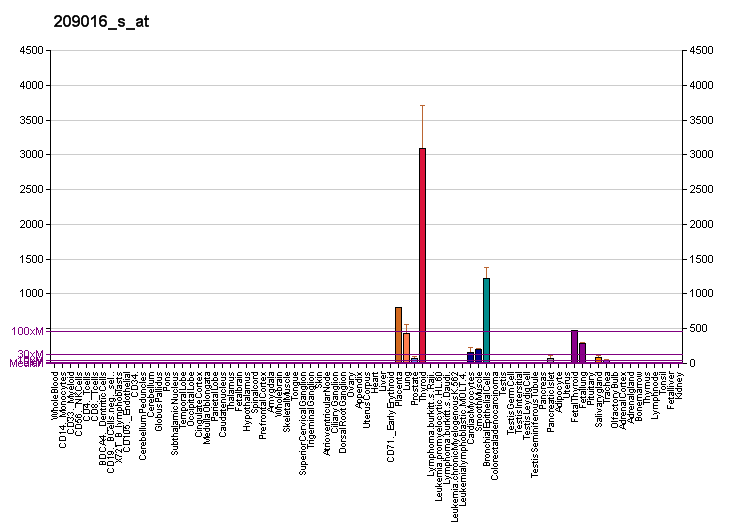
RNA expression pattern
Bgee	Human / Mouse (ortholog); Top expressed in: left lobe of thyroid gland; right lobe of thyroid gland; olfactory zone of nasal mucosa; upper lobe of left lung; right lung; islet of Langerhans; right uterine tube; gallbladder; minor salivary glands; placenta / Top expressed in: transitional epithelium of urinary bladder; right lung lobe; left lung; left lung lobe; crypt of lieberkuhn of small intestine; conjunctival fornix; submandibular gland; cervix; pyloric antrum; efferent ductule; More reference expression data
BioGPS	More reference expression data
Gene ontology
Molecular function	protein binding; structural molecule activity
Cellular component	cytoplasm; keratin filament; extracellular exosome; intermediate filament; nucleus; cytosol
Biological process	viral process; keratinization; cornification
Sources:Amigo / QuickGO
Orthologs
Databases	NCBI: entry; OMA: entry
Species	Human	Mouse
Entrez	3855	110310
Ensembl	ENSG00000135480	ENSMUSG00000023039
UniProt	P08729	Q9DCV7
RefSeq (mRNA)	NM_005556	NM_033073
RefSeq (protein)	NP_005547	NP_149064
Location (UCSC)	Chr 12: 52.23 – 52.25 Mb	Chr 15: 101.31 – 101.33 Mb
PubMed search
- Wikidata
View/Edit Human	View/Edit Mouse

Keratin, type II cytoskeletal 7 also known as cytokeratin-7 (CK-7) or keratin-7 (K7) or sarcolectin (SCL) is a protein that in humans is encoded by the KRT7 gene. Keratin 7 is a type II keratin. It is specifically expressed in the simple epithelia lining the cavities of the internal organs and in the gland ducts and blood vessels.

== Function ==
Keratin-7 is a member of the keratin gene family. The type II cytokeratins consist of basic or neutral proteins which are arranged in pairs of heterotypic keratin chains coexpressed during differentiation of simple and stratified epithelial tissues. This type II cytokeratin is specifically expressed in the simple epithelia lining the cavities of the internal organs and in the gland ducts and blood vessels. The genes encoding the type II cytokeratins are clustered in a region of chromosome 12q12-q13. Alternative splicing may result in several transcript variants; however, not all variants have been fully described.

Keratin-7 is found in simple glandular epithelia, and in transitional epithelium. Epithelial cells of the lung and breast both contain keratin-7, but some other glandular epithelia, such as those of the colon and prostate, do not.

== Immunohistochemistry ==
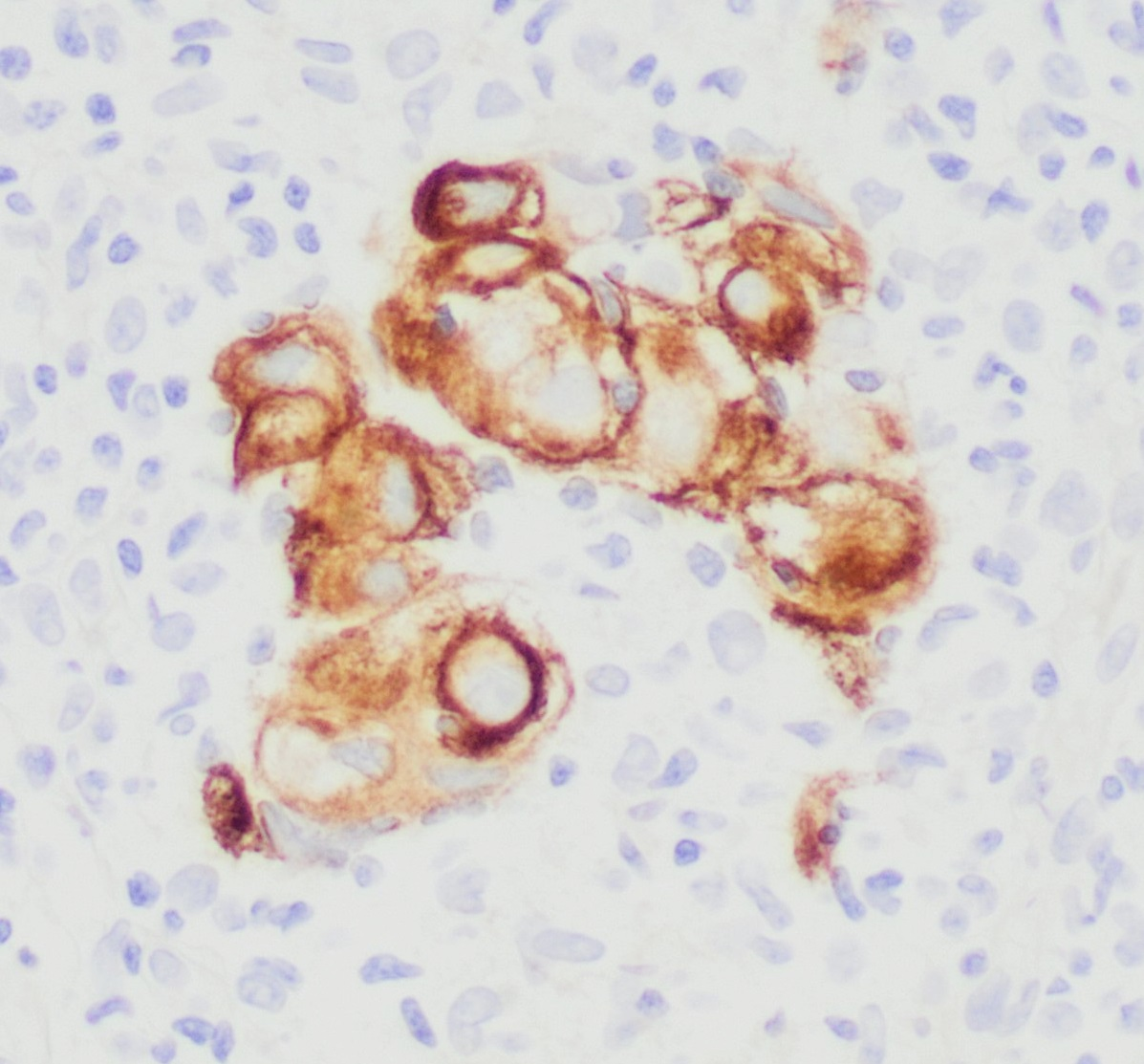
Immunohistochemistry for CK7 of a metastatic undifferentiated carcinoma to a lymph node.

Because the keratin-7 antigen is found in both healthy and neoplastic cells, antibodies to CK7 can be used in immunohistochemistry to distinguish ovarian and transitional cell carcinomas (staining positive) from colonic and prostate cancers (negative), respectively. It is commonly used together with CK20 when making such diagnoses.

CK7 and CK20 expression by various body locations.
