= Friend virus =

Virus classification
- (unranked): Virus
- Realm: Riboviria
- Kingdom: Pararnavirae
- Phylum: Artverviricota
- Class: Revtraviricetes
- Order: Ortervirales
- Family: Retroviridae
- Genus: Gammaretrovirus
- Species: Murine leukemia virus
- Strain: Friend virus

Strain of murine leukemia virus

The Friend virus (FV) is a strain of murine leukemia virus identified by Charlotte Friend in 1957. The virus infects adult immunocompetent mice and is a well-established model for studying genetic resistance to infection by an immunosuppressive retrovirus. The Friend virus has been used for both immunotherapy and vaccines. It is a member of the retroviridae group of viruses, with its nucleic acid being ssRNA.

== Vaccination ==
Experiments have shown that it is possible to protect against Friend virus infection with several types of vaccines, including attenuated viruses, viral proteins, peptides, and recombinant vaccinia vectors expressing the Friend virus gene. In a study of vaccinated mice, it was possible to identify the immunological epitopes required for protection against the virus, thus determining the types of immunological responses necessary or required for protection against it. The research discovered protective epitopes that were localized to F-MuLV gag and env proteins. This was achieved using recombinant vaccinia viruses expressing the gag and env genes of FV.

== Implications ==
Friend virus models showed valuable information regarding genetic resistance to retroviral disease. A particular gene of interest is the Rfv-3 gene, which cause susceptibility to suppression of the FV specific antibody response. The greater understanding by which the mechanisms work may aid in the development of immunotherapies and vaccines that may be applicable to human diseases.
