= Yuan Chang =

American virologist and pathologist

- 張遠
- Born: November 17, 1959 (age 66); Taipei, Taiwan
- Education: Stanford University (BS); University of Utah (MD)
- Known for: Discovery of the human cancer viruses KSHV and MCV
- Spouse: Patrick S. Moore
- Awards: Meyenburg Prize (1997); Robert Koch Prize (1998); Charles S. Mott Prize (2003); Paul Marks Prize (2003); American Cancer Society Professorship; Clarivate Citation Laureate (2017); Paul Ehrlich and Ludwig Darmstaedter Prize (2017)
- Scientific career
- Fields: Virology, pathology
- Workplaces: University of Pittsburgh Cancer Institute; Columbia University

Yuan Chang (simplified Chinese: 张远; traditional Chinese: 張遠; pinyin: Zhāng Yuǎn; born 17 November 1959) is a Taiwanese-born American virologist and pathologist who co-discovered together with her husband, Patrick S. Moore, the Kaposi's sarcoma-associated herpesvirus (KSHV) and Merkel cell polyomavirus, two of the seven known human oncoviruses.

== Early life and education ==
Chang was born in Taiwan and moved to the United States as a young child. She was raised in Salt Lake City, Utah, and earned a Bachelor of Science (B.S.) from Stanford University and then a Doctor of Medicine (M.D.) from the University of Utah College of Medicine. Chang trained in neuropathology at Stanford University under the noted clinical neuropathologist, Dikran Horoupian, publishing studies on eosinophilia-myalgia syndrome and progressive multifocal leukoencephalopathy. During this period she contributed to studies led by her friend, Julie Parsonnet, showing that Helicobacter pylori is a cause for gastric cancer.

== Career ==
Chang moved to Columbia University to pursue her first academic appointment as a clinician-scientist. Although initially interested in using representational difference analysis to study the genetic origins of brain tumors, she applied this technique to Kaposi's sarcoma resulting in the discovery of this new human tumor virus. In 1994, she co-discovered KSHV, also called human herpesvirus-8 (HHV-8), working with her husband Patrick S. Moore at Columbia University. Chang, Moore and collaborators subsequently showed that this virus was the etiologic agent of Kaposi's sarcoma and primary effusion lymphoma, while others showed it to be the cause of some forms of multicentric Castleman's disease. From two small DNA fragments representing less than 1% of the viral genome, she cloned the entire KSHV 165 kbase genome and fully sequenced the virus genome within two years after its initial discovery. This led to blood tests to detect infection for this virus, discovery of viral proteins likely to cause cancer and elucidation of the role of immune evasion in carcinogenesis caused by virus infection.

In 2008, Chang and Moore identified Merkel cell polyomavirus (MCV) in Merkel cell carcinoma using a computational tumor sequencing approach they developed. MCV is the most recently identified human tumor virus and the first polyomavirus established as a cause of human cancer.

Chang is now the American Cancer Society Professor in the Department of Pathology at the University of Pittsburgh. She has received a number of awards for her work, including the Meyenburg Foundation Award for Cancer Research, the Robert Koch Prize, The Sloan-Kettering Paul Marks Prize for Cancer Research, and the General Motors Charles S. Mott Prize in Cancer Research. She was elected to the National Academy of Sciences in 2012 and the American Academy of Arts and Sciences in 2024, received the Marjory Stephenson Prize of the Society for General Microbiology (now the Microbiology Society) in 2012 and the NCI Director's Career Achievement Award in 2019, and was appointed by President Obama to the National Cancer Advisory Board in 2015.

== Selected works ==
- Chang, Y; Cesarman, E; Pessin, M; et al. (1994). "Identification of herpesvirus-like DNA sequences in AIDS-associated Kaposi's sarcoma". Science. 266 (5192). American Association for the Advancement of Science: 1865–9. Bibcode:1994Sci...266.1865C. doi:10.1126/science.7997879. PMID 7997879. S2CID 29977325.
- Chang, Y; Moore, PS (1995). "Detection of herpesvirus-like DNA sequences in Kaposi's sarcoma in patients with and without HIV infection". The New England Journal of Medicine. 332 (18). Massachusetts Medical Society: 1181–5. doi:10.1056/nejm199505043321801. PMID 7700310.
- Chang, Y; Cesarman, E; Moore, PS; Said, JW; Knowles, DM (1995). "Kaposi's sarcoma-associated herpesvirus-like DNA sequences in AIDS-related body-cavity-based lymphomas". The New England Journal of Medicine. 332 (18). Massachusetts Medical Society: 1186–91. doi:10.1056/nejm199505043321802. PMID 7700311.
- Antman, K; Chang, Y (2000). "Kaposi's sarcoma". The New England Journal of Medicine. 342 (14). Massachusetts Medical Society: 1027–38. doi:10.1056/nejm200004063421407. PMID 10749966.
- Chang, Y; Moore, PS; Weiss, RA (October 2017). "Human Oncogenic Viruses: Nature and Discovery". Philosophical Transactions of the Royal Society: Biological Sciences. 372 (20160264). Royal Society Publishing: 1–9. doi:10.1098/rstb.2016.0264. JSTOR 44679143. PMC 5597731. PMID 28893931.
