= David Brudnoy =

American radio broadcasting personality (1940–2004)

- Born: June 5, 1940; Minneapolis, Minnesota, US
- Died: December 9, 2004 (aged 64); Boston, Massachusetts, US
- Education: Yale University, BA; Harvard University, MA; Brandeis University, MA/PhD
- Occupations: Talk radio host Professor
- Years active: 1976–2004
- Political party: Libertarian
- Awards: Massachusetts Broadcasters Hall of Fame (2008)

David Barry Brudnoy (June 5, 1940 – December 9, 2004) was an American talk radio host in Boston from 1976 to 2004. His radio talk show aired on WBZ radio and he espoused his libertarian views on a wide range of political issues in a courteous manner. Thanks to WBZ's wide broadcast signal reach, he gained a following from across the United States as well as Canada. On December 9, 2004, he died from Merkel cell carcinoma after it had metastasized to his lungs and kidneys.

== Background, education and first career ==
Born in Minneapolis, Minnesota, United States, to a Jewish family, David Brudnoy was the only child of Doris and Harry Brudnoy. Harry was a dentist in the Minneapolis area, a profession he maintained for over 50 years. During his youth, David Brudnoy was known to be precocious, and in addition to reading a lot, he enjoyed collecting stamps. He was also interested in history, and thanks to the influence of his Aunt Kathie, with whom he was close for all of his life, he became interested in movies; he often attended them with her. Years later, Brudnoy would become known for his work as a film critic, and he remarked in his autobiography that his aunt had undoubtedly contributed to his success by taking him to so many films.

Although he did not articulate it at the time, he was also aware of certain homosexual attractions. Years later, he would detail the confusion he felt, discussing his teenage and college years in his 1997 autobiography, Life is Not a Rehearsal. During his childhood, Brudnoy and his family briefly lived in Macon, Georgia, and San Antonio, Texas; his father had enlisted in the United States Army Reserve and the moves were so that he could be near army bases. Brudnoy first attended college in 1958, receiving a BA in Japanese Studies from Yale in New Haven. He also received MAs from Harvard and Brandeis, and a PhD from Brandeis, focusing on East Asian studies and history. He received an honorary doctorate from Emerson College in 1996.

As a professor, Brudnoy taught classes or was a guest lecturer at many major colleges and universities throughout Boston and New England, as well as in Texas: Boston University, Boston College, Northeastern University, Merrimack College, University of Rhode Island, Harvard Kennedy School at Harvard University, as well as Texas Southern University. He was respected as an educator: student evaluations for his courses at Boston University indicate that they were very well received, and former students were among those who wrote eloquent tributes to him when he died. According to those students, he was such a devoted educator that even as he was dying, he made certain to finish grading their term papers.

== Broadcast career ==
Brudnoy began a career in broadcast commentary in 1971 on Boston's local PBS television station, WGBH-TV. In 1976, he took over as host of his friend Avi Nelson's radio show on WHDH, in the midst of the city's unrest over court-ordered busing and desegregation in schools. He took to the job with ease, and increasingly gained popularity. From 1981 to 1986, he appeared on former Top 40 station WRKO, which was now news and talk, before moving to local stalwart WBZ. The top-rated talk radio host in New England, he appeared in a regular weekday evening slot until his retirement. At the end of his career, Brudnoy was, according to WBZ Radio's promotional materials, derived from Arbitron ratings, among the most-listened-to evening talk hosts in the United States.

Over the years, Brudnoy also appeared as a news commentator and host on local TV stations besides WGBH, including WCVB-TV (ABC), WNAC-TV, and WBZ-TV (CBS). He also appeared nationally on the CBS Morning News. He wrote movie reviews for Boston magazine and local community newspapers. During the 1970s he wrote articles for the National Review, and befriended its editor William F. Buckley Jr. He also wrote for The Alternative (later known as The American Spectator) in the early 1970s, but quit because of the editor's unwillingness to adopt a more liberal position on gay rights. His articles have appeared in The New York Times, The New Republic, and The Saturday Evening Post.

In 1990, his WBZ show was canceled in favor of a less expensive syndicated show hosted by Tom Snyder, but a mass public response, including support from The Boston Globe and the Boston Herald, helped lead to his quick return to the station's lineup.

Brudnoy's popularity escalated him into the Boston media elite, and he was the host of numerous social gatherings at his upscale Back Bay apartment, mixing students, media personalities, and politicians. After his bout with AIDS, Brudnoy began broadcasting from his apartment four nights out of five, welcoming his radio guests into his home and eagerly offering them cocktails. When he returned to the air in early January 1995, after his first battle with HIV/AIDS kept him off the air for ten weeks, Boston Mayor Thomas Menino formally declared January 5 as "David Brudnoy Day" due to his popularity.

In 1997, Brudnoy was awarded the Freedom of Speech Award from the National Association of Radio Talk Show Hosts, and was nominated for the major market "Personality of the Year" Marconi Radio Award by the National Association of Broadcasters. In 2001, he celebrated his 25th anniversary on the air. He was inducted to the Massachusetts Broadcasters Hall of Fame, posthumously, in 2008.

== Politics and sensibilities ==
Brudnoy's strongly libertarian opinions were expressed with wit and thoughtfulness. He described his own manner as "less ideological and more empathic", in contrast to more recent figures of conservative talk radio. Many regard him as a unique radio host who was effective at injecting a different perspective into the political dialogue rather than merely cultivating a particular political segment of the population.

His non-partisan, thoughtful way of discussing issues helped him gain a large following despite being based in a staunchly Democratic region. Political figures from both ends of the spectrum praised him for his contributions to the local and national dialogue. Among those who eulogized him when he died were liberals like Senator Edward M. Kennedy who said that David was uniquely fair to his guests. "He couldn't care less about your party label, as long as you knew what you were talking about, because he always did"; and conservatives like then-Governor Mitt Romney who said that Brudnoy was "... a friend to hundreds of thousands of people, most of whom he never even saw in person . . . David has left us all a huge inheritance. It's an inheritance rich in tolerance, in faith, in the greatness of humanity, in respect for all people..."

In 2000, Brudnoy declared himself a member of the Libertarian Party.

Although his father Harry was a practicing Jew and a member of a Minneapolis synagogue, David Brudnoy was an agnostic who disliked organized religion and was critical of religions that tried to impose their views on others. He did have a bar mitzvah in May 1953, but he was already becoming skeptical of religion and recalled that event as the last time he followed his religious traditions. Years later, he wrote several opinion pieces about his opposition to religious dogmatism. But on the other hand, he also wrote favorably about the good that the church was capable of doing. In one piece, he stated that "...the church itself, for Catholics and non-Catholics alike, is a bulwark of our society. Its severely overburdened clergy are crucial to the development of our youths, to comforting our elders, and to tending our sick."

But while he was a skeptic about the tenets of organized religion, during his late-2004 bout of serious illness he admitted he had prayed in various ways, including with a Catholic priest who was a friend of his; and he said that he had discussed religion with several of his Jewish friends, including political commentator Jon Keller and conservative newspaper columnist Jeff Jacoby. But he said he did not expect to go to either a heaven or a hell.

== Homosexuality ==
Brudnoy came to realize that he was homosexual early in life but successfully hid the fact for many years. While at Texas Southern, he "adopted" a young, recently single mother, Patricia Kennedy, and for many years Brudnoy and Kennedy enjoyed a relationship of mutual convenience, with Brudnoy able to use Kennedy as a cover for his homosexuality, and in return serving as a surrogate father to her two young children. Brudnoy did not reveal his homosexuality to his father and stepmother until his illness in 1994; his father Harry was 88 years old when Brudnoy finally phoned him to give him the news and also discuss the health crisis he was undergoing. David was pleasantly surprised that his parents were supportive. Brudnoy had previously come out to his aunt and uncle after they lost a son (also homosexual) to AIDS.

Brudnoy publicly revealed his homosexuality in 1994, after returning from hospitalization to overcome his long-hidden fight with AIDS. Despite the controversy, his ratings reportedly did not suffer as a result. The controversy was rekindled somewhat after the release of his autobiography, in which he described a history of sexual excesses. Brudnoy did not attempt to mask his sexuality during his adult life, but also made no direct indications of it; it was well known among his colleagues in broadcasting long before he spoke publicly about it. His closest and oldest friend was psychologist Dr. Ward Cromer, with whom he took dozens of trips abroad, and who was incorrectly assumed by many to be Brudnoy's sexual partner. Neither of them used that phraseology to describe their relationship, preferring a more accurate title of "best friend". When Brudnoy died, it was Cromer who became executor of his estate.

== Illness ==
Brudnoy was diagnosed with HIV/AIDS in 1988, but kept his treatment a secret until his condition became serious after he contracted pneumonia in 1994. He was absent from public life for some time to fight the disease. Comatose and near death at one point, he eventually returned to reasonable health. It was at that time, in order to conserve his strength, that he broadcast his show from his apartment in the Back Bay section of Boston during part of 1994. Once he was able to return to the air, Brudnoy announced the creation of a fund to fight AIDS. His illness inspired him to publish his autobiography; at the time, it was not a best-seller, but after he died, it became a collector's item, since his publisher had originally let it go out of print and now many of his fans wanted copies of it.

In September 2003, he was diagnosed with Merkel cell carcinoma, a rare form of skin cancer. After hospitalization and treatment, including another period of being considered near death, the cancer went into apparent remission, and Brudnoy returned to work, with a strained voice, in March 2004. However, in November 2004, doctors discovered that cancer had spread into his lungs and kidneys, forcing him to undergo dialysis in addition to cancer treatment.

Brudnoy checked into Massachusetts General Hospital on December 3, 2004. On December 8, Brudnoy made his last radio broadcast on his show via a deathbed interview with WBZ reporter Gary LaPierre. The following day, Brudnoy ordered his doctors to remove all artificial life support systems, leaving him only with oxygen, morphine, and minimal food. He died hours after having the support removed, on December 9, 2004.

After a few days of on-air remembrance, Brudnoy's time slot was assigned to Paul Sullivan, who had previously taken over two hours of Brudnoy's shift when Brudnoy's illness necessitated reducing his show from five hours to three. Sullivan too would die of cancer, on September 9, 2007.

A public memorial was held for Brudnoy on February 27, 2005, at the Cutler Majestic Theater in Boston, arranged by his WBZ colleagues and Emerson College (which had previously awarded him an honorary doctorate). The memorial service included the participation of the brothers of the Phi Alpha Tau fraternity of Emerson College whom Brudnoy had mentored.

== Works ==
- Brudnoy, David (July 27, 1957). "Politeness Just Old Japanese Custom". The Minneapolis Star. p. 14 – via newspapers.com.
- Brudnoy, David (August 17, 1957). "High Schools in Japan 'Uniform'". The Minneapolis Star. p. 8 – via newspapers.com.
- Brudnoy, David (April 1971). Liberty's Bugler: The Seven Ages of Theodore Schroeder (PhD dissertation). Brandeis University. OCLC 47982158.
- Brudnoy, David (February 1975). "A Decade in Zion: Theodore Schroeder's Initial Assault On the Mormons". The Historian. 37 (2). Wiley: 241–256. doi:10.1111/j.1540-6563.1975.tb00024.x. JSTOR 24444028.
- Brudnoy, David; Cheeseman, William E. (1975). Our Heritage: A History of the United States.
- Brudnoy, David (1986). Caught. McGraw-Hill.
- Brudnoy, David (April 17, 1995). "Positively HIV". National Review. Archived from the original on December 12, 2004 – via Wayback Machine.
- Brudnoy, David (January 1997). Life is Not a Rehearsal. New York City: Doubleday. ISBN 0-385-48276-0.
