= Ehrlich ascites carcinoma =

Ehrlich-Lettre ascites carcinoma (EAC) is also known as Ehrlich cell. It was originally established as an ascites tumor in mice.

== Ehrlich cell ==
The tumor was cultured in vivo, which became known as the Ehrlich cell. After 1948 Ehrlich cultures spread around research institutes all over the world. The Ehrlich cell became popular because it could be expanded by in vivo passage. This made it useful for biochemical studies involving large amounts of tissues. It could also be maintained in vitro for more carefully controlled studies. Culture techniques in large-scale, mice passage is less attractive, due to the contamination of the tumor with multifarious host inflammatory cells.

== Properties ==
EAC is referred to as undifferentiated carcinoma, and is originally hyper-diploid. The permeability to water is highest at the initiation of the S phase and progressively decreases to its lowest value just after mitosis. Activation heats for water permeability vary during the cell cycle, ranging from 9–14 kca/mole.
