= Kenzel Doe =

American football player (born 1992)

Profile
- Positions: Wide receiver, Return specialist

Personal information
- Born: June 6, 1992 (age 34); Reidsville, North Carolina
- Listed height: 5 ft 8 in (1.73 m)
- Listed weight: 176 lb (80 kg)

Career information
- High school: Reidsville (NC)
- College: Wisconsin

Career history
- 2015: Pittsburgh Steelers*
- 2015: Brooklyn Bolts
- 2016: Edmonton Eskimos
- 2017: The Spring League
- 2018: Nebraska Danger
- * Offseason or practice squad member only
- Stats at CFL.ca

Kenzel Doe (born June 6, 1992) is an American former football wide receiver and return specialist, most recently for the Nebraska Danger of the Indoor Football League (IFL). He played college football for Wisconsin and has played in both the National Football League, and the Canadian Football League, as well as playing for two other minor league football teams.

== Early life ==
Doe was born and raised in Reidsville, North Carolina. He attended Reidsville High School, who went undefeated during Doe's time playing there.

== College career ==
Coming into college, Doe was rated as a 3 star recruit. Doe attended Wisconsin from 2010 to 2014, and majored in sociology. After red-shirting, Doe played in 48 games from 2011 to 2014, excelling on special teams. Doe returned 49 punts for 481 yards and one touchdown, as well as 58 kickoff returns for 1,388 yards and a touchdown, which was scored during the 2014 Capital One Bowl. Doe also caught 42 passes for 379 yards and a touchdown, plus rushing for 143 yards on 19 carries. Doe earned several letters during his time in college.

== Professional career ==
=== Pittsburgh Steelers ===
Despite being undrafted during the 2015 NFL draft, Doe participated in rookie mini-camps with the New England Patriots and Houston Texans, but remained unsigned until August, when Doe was signed by the Pittsburgh Steelers. Doe participated in four preseason games, including the Pro Football Hall of Fame Game, but was cut prior to the final week of preseason play. Doe participated exclusively on special teams, and returned 2 kickoffs for 43 yards, and 8 punts for 26 yards, with 1 fumble, which Doe recovered.

=== Brooklyn Bolts ===
After being cut by the Steelers, Doe played for the Brooklyn Bolts in the startup Fall Experimental Football League during their brief 2015 season, which was their final season before folding in early 2016. Led by quarterback Josh Freeman, and alongside fellow future CFL players John Harris, Ricky Collins, and LaDarius Perkins, Doe recorded 2 catches for 28 yards during the two games played that season, including one game which took place during storms influenced by Hurricane Joaquin. Doe also served as a returner during his time with the Bolts.

=== Edmonton Eskimos ===
Following his stints with the Steelers and the FXFL in 2015, Doe began receiving calls by Canadian Football teams in January 2016, and signed with the Edmonton Eskimos on his birthday, June 6. During the 2 game CFL preseason, Doe recorded two catches for 23 yards, 6 punt returns for 27 yards, and two kickoff returns for 42 yards. Doe made the active roster for the Eskimos, but was demoted to the practice roster after the first game. Doe was called back up in week 4 to become the starting returner for Edmonton, taking over for the struggling Joe McKnight. Doe ended up being demoted again during week 16, in favor of Troy Stoudermire. Stoudermire went on to have higher return averages, but fumbled several times over only a few touches over four games, something Doe only did only once in nearly a full season as a returner. Following Edmonton's postseason defeat, Doe was cut in January 2017. Doe finished his year in Edmonton with 45 kickoff returns for 937 yards, 56 punt returns for 437 yards, and 5 missed field-goal returns for 192 yards. Doe also had one catch for 13 yards. He was criticized for not accepting better field position by accepting kneels downs and therefore sacrificing single points to opposing teams on returns, but also provided stability to the Edmonton special teams, despite having poor blocking in front of him. One of Doe's most memorable plays was a return where he was tackled by his undershirt. While running the ball back, a member of the Saskatchewan Roughriders grabbed at Doe's shirt, which tore away. Doe was then reeled in by the threads of his shirt like a fishing line, slowing him enough for other players to tackle him.

=== The Spring League ===
Doe participated in the 2017 Spring League in West Virginia. This developmental league pairs veterans and younger players with NFL coaches to help them gain exposure to professional teams. During his time in the Spring League, Doe, appearing on both the "West" and "South" rosters, played with teammates such as Ben Tate and McLeod Bethel-Thompson, and faced opposing players such as Greg Hardy, Ahmad Bradshaw, Anthony Dixon, and Ricky Stanzi. During the first game of Spring League play, Doe faced his former Brooklyn Bolts coach Terry Shea, who was coaching the opposing East Roster, which also included Doe's former Bolts teammate, Manasseh Garner.

=== Nebraska Danger ===
On October 30, 2017, Doe signed with an arena football team, the Nebraska Danger of the IFL. In the season opener vs. the Cedar Rapids Titans, Doe scored the first touchdown of the 2018 IFL Season when he took an end-around for a score as part of a 44-31 Nebraska victory. Doe was the only receiver to play all 14 regular season games for Nebraska, hauling in 37 passes for 352 yards and 5 touchdowns. Doe's other stats included 16 rushes for 52 yards and a score, as well as throwing a pass for a 3-yard touchdown, 3 tackles on defense, and committing two fumbles. Doe also converted a pair of 2 point conversions, one as a passer and one as a receiver, and throughout the season served as the team long snapper. During Nebraska's playoff game, Doe was the most productive receiver for Nebraska, catching three passes for 48 yards in the 48–17 loss to the top seeded Iowa Barnstormers. Doe became a free agent on September 5, 2018.

== Personal life ==
Doe was born to Myra Blackwell and Kenneth Doe. His stepfather is Dale Blackwell. Prior to his time at Wisconsin, Doe had not lost a football game since he was 13 years old, going 103–0. During 2016, Doe lost two former teammates and/or roommates due to gun violence. Calgary Stampeders defensive back Mylan Hicks, Doe's teammate from the Brooklyn Bolts was killed in a shooting at a Calgary nightclub, and Edmonton teammate Joe McKnight was murdered in an incident of road rage. Doe is close friends with feller Badger Melvin Gordon and helped work for Gordon in marketing Gordon's personal brand.
