= A.C. Leonard =

American gridiron football player (born 1992)

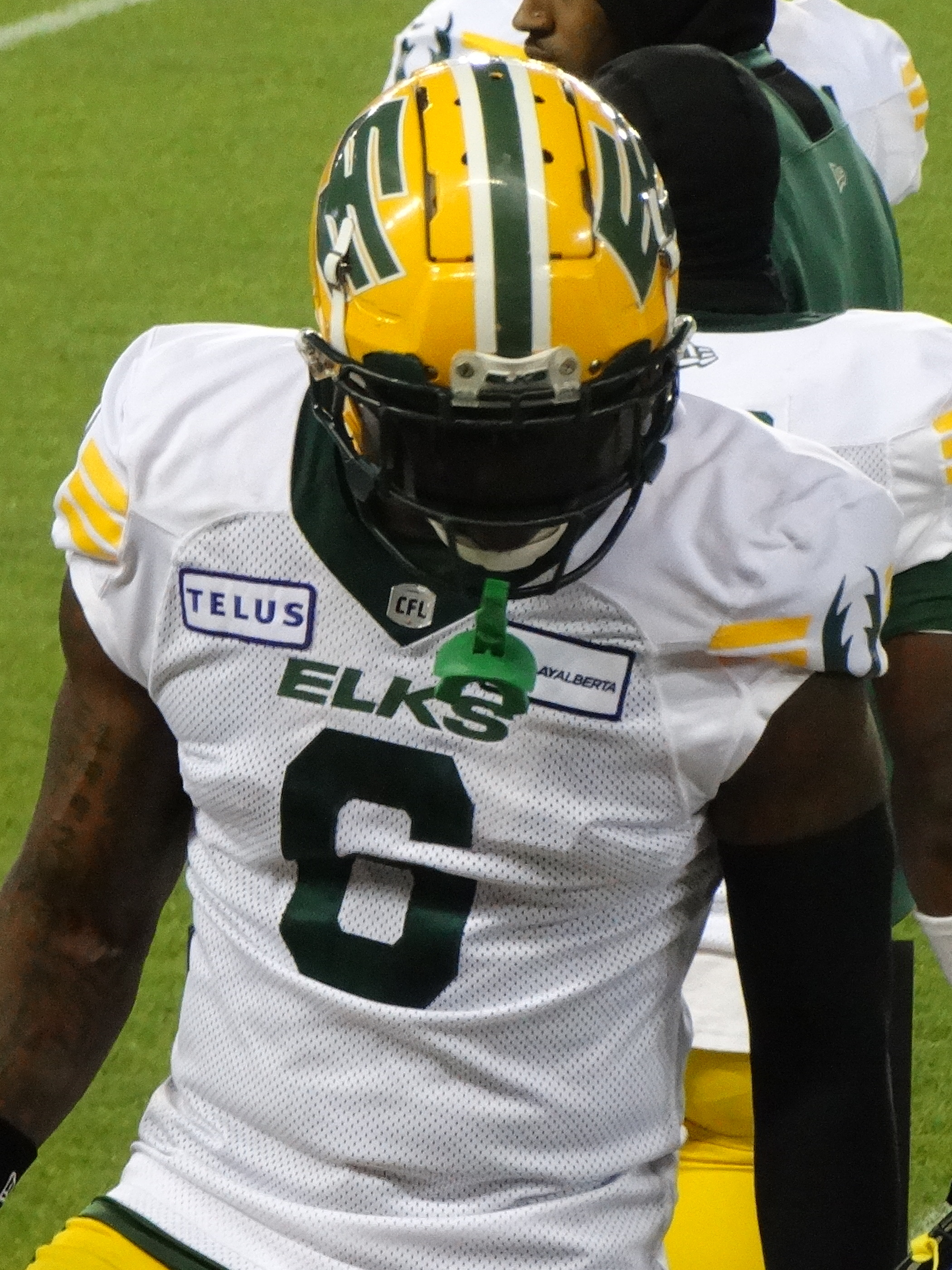
- Leonard with the Edmonton Elks in 2023

Profile
- Positions: Defensive lineman, tight end

Personal information
- Born: January 15, 1992 (age 34); Palatka, Florida, U.S.
- Listed height: 6 ft 2 in (1.88 m)
- Listed weight: 250 lb (113 kg)

Career information
- High school: University Christian (Jacksonville, Florida)
- College: Tennessee State
- NFL draft: 2014: undrafted

Career history
- Minnesota Vikings (2014)*; Brooklyn Bolts (2014); New Orleans VooDoo (2014–2015)*; BC Lions (2015); Hudson Valley Fort (2015)*; Jacksonville Sharks (2016)*; Saskatchewan Roughriders (2016–2017); Ottawa Redblacks (2018); Saskatchewan Roughriders (2019–2022); Edmonton Elks (2023–2024)
- * Offseason or practice squad member only

Awards and highlights
- CFL East All-Star (2018)

Career CFL statistics
- Receptions: 17
- Receiving yards: 187
- Receiving touchdowns: 2
- Stats at CFL.ca

AC Leonard (born January 15, 1992) is an American professional gridiron football defensive lineman. He played tight end for the BC Lions in 2015 before converting to a defensive lineman in 2016. He attended Tennessee State University, where he played college football for the Tigers and studied criminal justice. Leonard has been member of NFL, AFL, FXFL and CFL.

== Early life and college ==
Leonard played high school football at Jean Ribault before transferring to Interlachen and then to University Christian School in 2010. At University Christian, he played primarily as a tight end, but also as a linebacker and defensive end. He played college football for the Florida Gators in 2011, and recorded eight receptions for 99 yards over nine games. A knee injury caused him to miss three games in his freshman season. Leonard transferred to Tennessee State to play for the Tigers the following season, where he played for two years. He recorded 1,174 yards for 11 touchdowns on 85 receptions with the Tigers. Also played at Palatka High School his Freshman year.

== Professional career ==
Pre-draft measurables
Height	Weight	Arm length	Hand span	40-yard dash	20-yard shuttle	Three-cone drill	Vertical jump	Broad jump	Bench press
6 ft 2 3/8 in (1.89 m)	252 lb (114 kg)	33 in (0.84 m)	9 1/4 in (0.23 m)	4.50 s	4.45 s	7.10 s	34.0 in (0.86 m)	10 ft 8 in (3.25 m)	20 reps
All values from NFL Combine

=== Minnesota Vikings ===
Leonard was eligible for the 2014 NFL draft, and ran the fastest 40-yard dash among tight ends at the NFL Scouting Combine that year. He was signed as an undrafted free agent by the Minnesota Vikings. He participated in training camp, where he missed multiple practices due to an injury or illness initially described as a headache. He was later released on August 6, 2014.

=== Fall Experimental League and Arena Football ===
Later that year, Leonard played for the Brooklyn Bolts of the Fall Experimental Football League in its inaugural season. He was assigned to the New Orleans VooDoo of the Arena Football League on December 5, 2014. He was placed on the Other League Exempt list on February 23, 2015.

=== BC Lions ===
In April 2015, Leonard signed with the BC Lions. Leonard made his CFL debut on July 17, 2015, against the Saskatchewan Roughriders, where he recorded four receptions for 26 yards and two touchdowns.

=== Fall Experimental League and Arena Football (II) ===
He spent some time with the Hudson Valley Fort (FXFL) in 2015. On October 16, 2015, Leonard was assigned to the Jacksonville Sharks.

=== Saskatchewan Roughriders ===
Leonard signed with the Saskatchewan Roughriders of the CFL in May 2016. In two seasons with the Riders Leonard played in 33 games and played a significant role in the team's defense, totaling 66 tackles and 10 quarterback sacks. Following the 2017 season he was not re-signed and became a free agent on February 13, 2018.

=== Ottawa Redblacks ===
On February 13, 2018, Leonard was signed to a one-year contract with the Ottawa Redblacks. In one season with the Redblacks Leonard played in 17 games contributing 49 tackles and six quarterback sacks. He was not re-signed by the Redblacks following the season and became a free agent.

=== Saskatchewan Roughriders (II) ===
On February 14, 2019, Leonard signed with the Saskatchewan Roughriders. Leonard was placed on the six-game injured list on August 8, 2019, with an unspecified injury during practice. Leonard played three seasons for the Riders appearing in 41 regular season games and contributing with 118 defensive tackles, 23 sacks, five forced fumbles and one interception. He was released by the Riders on January 31, 2023; one day before he was due to receive a $40,000 roster bonus on February 1.

=== Edmonton Elks ===
On the same day he was released by the Roughriders, Leonard signed a contract with the Edmonton Elks of the Canadian Football League (CFL). The move reunited him with head coach and general manager Chris Jones who successfully converted him to a defensive lineman in 2016. He played in all 18 regular season games where he recorded 45 defensive tackles, 12 sacks, and two forced fumbles. He became a free agent upon the expiry of his contract on February 13, 2024.

== Domestic battery arrest ==
On February 15, 2012, Leonard was arrested and charged with misdemeanor domestic battery after an alleged altercation with a woman he had been dating for 17 months. The woman told police that she had been shoved and dragged from an apartment by her hair. As a result of the arrest, Leonard was suspended from the Florida Gators. He pleaded no contest to the charge in April, and received a six-month probation. Although Leonard's suspension was lifted in late March, Gators head coach Will Muschamp stated that he would serve a suspension during the 2012 season. Leonard and Muschamp later decided it would be best if the player transferred. Leonard transferred to Tennessee State prior to the start of the football season that year.
