= Earl Okine =

American football player (born 1990)

No. 95
- Position: Defensive end

Personal information
- Born: January 4, 1990 (age 36); Gainesville, Florida, U.S.
- Listed height: 6 ft 7 in (2.01 m)
- Listed weight: 290 lb (132 kg)

Career information
- High school: Gainesville
- College: Florida
- NFL draft: 2013: undrafted

Career history
- Houston Texans (2013)*; Calgary Stampeders (2013)*; Orlando Predators (2014); Brooklyn Bolts (2014); Indianapolis Colts (2015); Kansas City Chiefs (2016–2017)*; Detroit Lions (2017)*; Arizona Cardinals (2017)*; Orlando Apollos (2019); Saskatchewan Roughriders (2019); Toronto Argonauts (2020)*
- * Offseason or practice squad member only

Career NFL statistics
- Total tackles: 5
- Stats at Pro Football Reference

Career AFL statistics
- Total tackles: 22
- Sacks: 5.5
- Forced fumbles: 1
- Fumble recoveries: 1
- Stats at ArenaFan.com

Earl James Okine (born January 4, 1990) is an American former professional football player who was a defensive end in the National Football League (NFL) and Canadian Football League (CFL). He played college football for the Florida Gators and signed with the Houston Texans as an undrafted free agent in 2013. Okine was also a member of the CFL's Calgary Stampeders, Saskatchewan Roughriders, and Toronto Argonauts, the Arena Football League's Orlando Predators, the Fall Experimental Football League's Brooklyn Bolts, the NFL's Indianapolis Colts, Kansas City Chiefs and Detroit Lions, and the AAF's Orlando Apollos.

== High school & college ==
Okine played football and basketball for Gainesville High School. In football, he earned a Third-team Class 5A all-state selection as a senior. He dressed for 6 games in 2008 while with the Florida Gators, but did not appear and decided to redshirt that year. From 2009 to 2012 recorded 27 tackles, 1 sack, and 1 blocked field goal.

== Professional career ==
=== Houston Texans ===
Okine signed as an undrafted free agent with the Houston Texans in May 2013. He was cut before the start of the season.

=== Calgary Stampeders ===
He then spent 1 month with the Calgary Stampeders of the Canadian Football League (CFL), but did not appear in any games.

=== Orlando Predators ===
In 2014, Okine played for the Orlando Predators of the Arena Football League (AFL) and recorded 5.5 sacks in 16 games.

=== Brooklyn Bolts ===
He then played for the Brooklyn Bolts of the newly-formed Fall Experimental Football League.

=== Indianapolis Colts ===
On March 3, 2015, Okine signed with the Indianapolis Colts. He appeared in 3 games for the Colts, making 1 tackle, and was waived on October 1. He signed to the Colts' practice squad on October 5. On December 21 he was signed to the active roster. On September 3, 2016, he was waived by the Colts as part of final roster cuts.

=== Kansas City Chiefs ===
On September 9, 2016, Okine was signed to the Chiefs' practice squad. He spent time on and off the Chiefs' practice squad throughout the season before signing a reserve/future contract with the team on January 19, 2017.

On September 2, 2017, Okine was waived by the Chiefs.

=== Detroit Lions ===
On September 4, 2017, Okine was signed to the Detroit Lions' practice squad. He was released on September 22, 2017.

=== Arizona Cardinals ===
On September 26, 2017, Okine was signed to the Arizona Cardinals' practice squad.

=== Orlando Apollos ===
Okine signed with the Orlando Apollos of the Alliance of American Football for the 2019 season. In 8 games played with his second Orlando based team, Okine made 17 tackles 5 sacks, 11 quarterback hits, and an interception.

=== Saskatchewan Roughriders ===
After the AAF ceased operations in April 2019, Okine signed with the practice roster for the Saskatchewan Roughriders of the Canadian Football League on July 14, 2019. He was promoted to the active roster on July 19. Okine recorded 3 tackles and scored a defensive touchdown during 6 games played, but was released on October 14.

=== Toronto Argonauts ===
Okine signed a contract extension with the Toronto Argonauts on December 28, 2020. On February 1, 2021, Okine was released by the Argonauts.
