= Brock Jensen =

American gridiron football player (born 1990)

No. 16
- Position: Quarterback

Personal information
- Born: September 19, 1990 (age 36); Waupaca, Wisconsin, U.S.
- Listed height: 6 ft 3 in (1.91 m)
- Listed weight: 225 lb (102 kg)

Career information
- High school: Waupaca (WI)
- College: North Dakota State (2009–2013)
- NFL draft: 2014: undrafted

Career history
- Miami Dolphins (2014)*; Omaha Mammoths (2014); Ottawa Redblacks (2015–2016)
- * Offseason or practice squad member only

Awards and highlights
- Grey Cup champion (2016); 3× FCS national champion (2011–2013); MVFC Offensive Player of the Year (2013); First-team All-MVFC (2013)
- Stats at CFL.ca

Brock Jensen (born September 19, 1990) is an American former professional football quarterback. He played college football at North Dakota State. He led the North Dakota State Bison to three consecutive national championships (2011–2013). After completing his college career Jensen spent time with the Miami Dolphins, Omaha Mammoths, and Ottawa Redblacks. While with the Ottawa Redblacks he became a Grey Cup champion as the backup to Henry Burris.

== College career ==
=== Statistics ===
Season	Team	Games			Passing								Rushing			
Season	Team	GP	GS	Record	Cmp	Att	Pct	Yds	Y/A	TD	Int	Rtg	Att	Yds	Avg	TD
2009	North Dakota State	0	0	—	Redshirted (redshirt)											
2010	North Dakota State	9	7	4–3	59	131	45.0	950	7.3	7	2	120.5	68	231	3.4	4
2011	North Dakota State	15	15	14–1	219	326	67.1	2,524	7.7	14	4	143.9	73	173	2.4	9
2012	North Dakota State	14	14	14–1	207	338	61.2	2,331	6.9	17	8	131.0	111	357	3.2	12
2013	North Dakota State	15	15	15–0	218	329	66.3	2,793	8.5	34	7	167.4	99	479	4.8	10
Career		54	52	47–5	703	1,124	62.5	8,598	7.6	72	21	144.2	351	1,240	3.5	35

== Professional career ==
=== Miami Dolphins ===
Jensen signed with the Miami Dolphins of the National Football League (NFL) as an undrafted free agent following the 2014 NFL draft; he was released on July 28, 2014. On August 5, 2014, Jensen re-signed with the Dolphins after a shoulder injury to quarterback Matt Moore, and was again released August 11, 2014.

=== Omaha Mammoths ===
In 2014, Jensen played with the Omaha Mammoths of the Fall Experimental Football League (FXFL), splitting time at quarterback with Jordan Jefferson. In Week 1 against the Boston Brawlers, he relieved Jefferson and completed 10 of 12 passes for a team-high 168 yards and two touchdowns in a 41–18 victory. The following week against the Florida Blacktips, Jensen completed 5 of 11 passes for 56 yards and added 15 rushing yards, including a touchdown, in a 20–19 win. In Week 3 against the Brooklyn Bolts, he again relieved Jefferson and rushed for two touchdowns, including a 27-yard score, in a 15–13 loss. Following a 3–1 start, the remainder of the season was canceled.

=== Ottawa Redblacks ===
Jensen saw his first CFL regular-season action on July 22, 2016, following an injury to Trevor Harris, completing 20 of 29 pass attempts for 271 yards and two touchdowns against the Saskatchewan Roughriders. He made his first career start in Week 20 of the 2016 season as Ottawa had already clinched a playoff spot and were resting some of their starters. Jensen was released, along with 6 other players, on June 5, 2017, during training camp for the 2017 season.

== Career statistics ==
=== CFL ===
Year	Team	Games			Passing								Rushing			
Year	Team	GD	GS	Record	Cmp	Att	Pct	Yds	Y/A	TD	Int	Rtg	Att	Yds	Avg	TD
2016	OTT	17	1	0–1	29	43	67.4	330	7.7	2	0	105.8	19	73	4.8	4
Career		17	1	0–1	29	43	67.4	330	7.7	2	0	105.8	19	73	4.8	4
