= LaDarius Perkins =

American football player (born 1990)

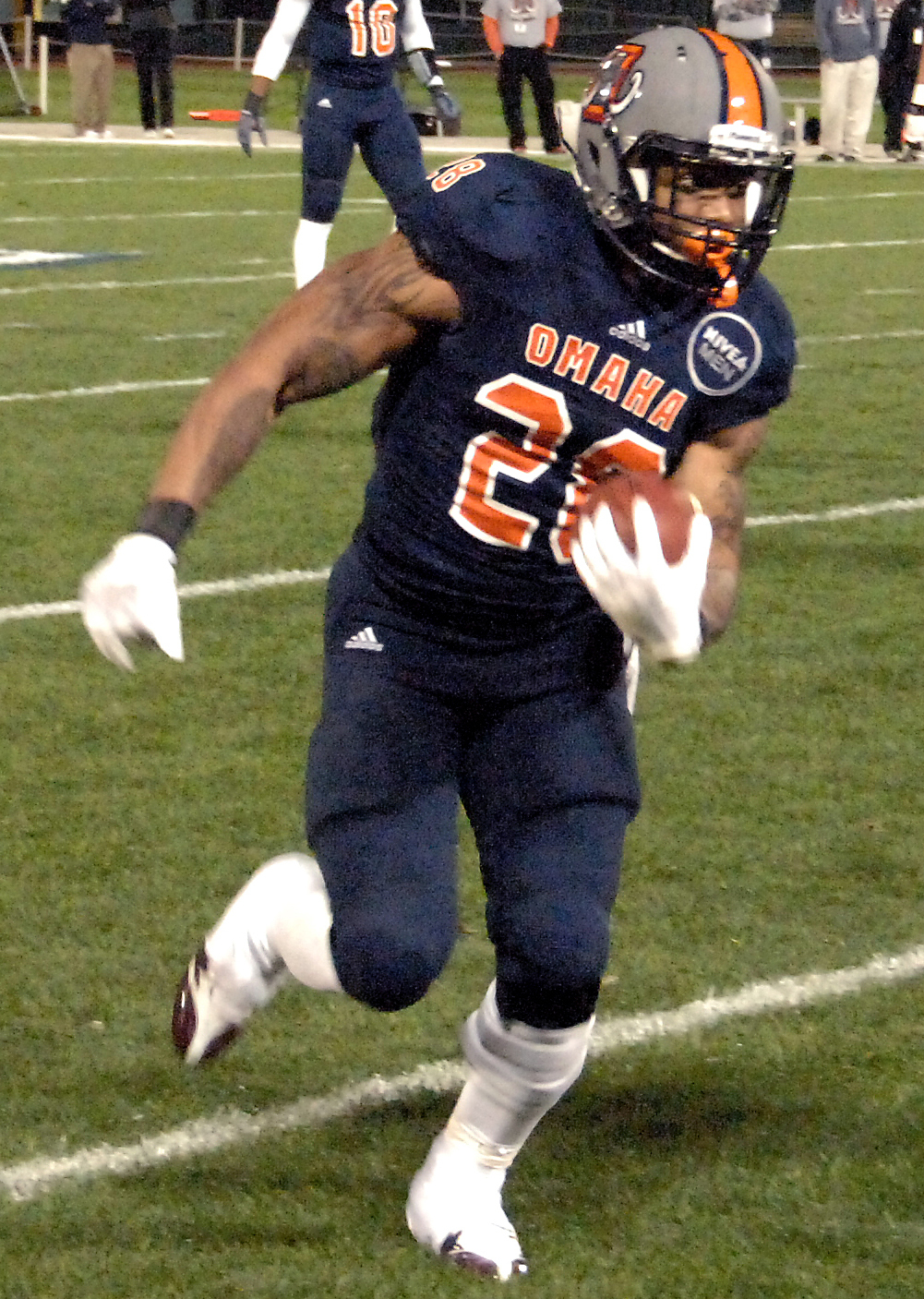
- Perkins with the Omaha Mammoths in 2014

No. 36
- Position: Running back

Personal information
- Born: September 18, 1990 (age 36)
- Listed height: 5 ft 7 in (1.70 m)
- Listed weight: 208 lb (94 kg)

Career information
- High school: Greenville (MS) St. Joseph's Catholic
- College: Mississippi State
- NFL draft: 2014: undrafted

Career history
- Green Bay Packers (2014)*; Omaha Mammoths (2014); Pittsburgh Steelers (2014)*; Brooklyn Bolts (2015); Indianapolis Colts (2015)*; Edmonton Eskimos (2016–2017); Birmingham Iron (2019)
- * Offseason or practice squad member only

Awards and highlights
- Second Team All-SEC (2012)
- Stats at Pro Football Reference
- Stats at CFL.ca

LaDarius Robert Perkins (born September 18, 1990) is an American former professional football running back. He played college football for Mississippi State University, and signed with the Green Bay Packers as an undrafted free agent in 2014. Perkins was also a member of the Pittsburgh Steelers and Indianapolis Colts, as well as the Fall Experimental Football League's Omaha Mammoths and Brooklyn Bolts, the Canadian Football League's Edmonton Eskimos, and the Alliance of American Football's Birmingham Iron.

== Professional career ==
=== Green Bay Packers ===
After going undrafted in the 2014 NFL draft, Perkins signed with the Green Bay Packers on May 12, 2014.

=== Pittsburgh Steelers ===
On November 19, 2014, Perkins was signed to the Pittsburgh Steelers practice squad.

=== Indianapolis Colts ===
Perkins was signed to the practice squad of the Indianapolis Colts on December 16, 2015.

=== Edmonton Eskimos ===
Perkins signed with the Edmonton Eskimos of the Canadian Football League (CFL) on September 1, 2016, half-way through the 2017 season. He saw his first action in the CFL when running backs John White, Travon Van, and Kendial Lawrence all went down with injury moving Perkins into a prominent role for the teams Week 7 match against the Hamilton Tiger-Cats, in which he carried the ball 19 times for 105 yards.

He was released on May 20, 2018.

=== Birmingham Iron ===
In 2019, Perkins joined the Birmingham Iron of the Alliance of American Football. After the first 5 games of the season, he was waived on March 12, 2019. Perkins' statistic numbered 14 carries for 42 yards and 14 receptions for 66 yards.
