= Phillip Steward =

American gridiron football player (born 1990)

No. 58
- Position: Linebacker

Personal information
- Born: September 7, 1990 (age 36); Missouri City, Texas, U.S.
- Listed height: 6 ft 1 in (1.85 m)
- Listed weight: 235 lb (107 kg)

Career information
- High school: Missouri City (TX) Hightower
- College: Houston
- NFL draft: 2013: undrafted

Career history
- St. Louis Rams (2013); Boston Brawlers (2014); Saskatchewan Roughriders (2015)*; FXFL Blacktips (2015)
- * Offseason or practice squad member only

Awards and highlights
- 2014 FXFL All-Star; First-team All-C-USA (2012)
- Stats at Pro Football Reference
- Stats at CFL.ca (archive)

Phillip Deshawn Steward (born September 7, 1990) is an American former professional football linebacker. He was signed by the St. Louis Rams as an undrafted free agent in 2013. He played college football at Houston.

== Early life ==
Steward helped lead the Hightower Hurricanes to a 15–1 record and berth in the state championship game his junior season and was named All-District and All-State honoree. During his senior season, he competed in the Space City Classic and Texas-Louisiana All-Star games. Finished as the second-leading tackler on the team with 150 solo stops, 12 sacks and three forced fumbles and was named a member of the Houston Chronicle Top 100 and named First Team All-District 23-5A.

== College career ==
Steward was a four-year starter for Houston. During his freshman season, he finished fourth on team with 89 tackles and was one of 29 players to compete in all 14 games and one of only five freshmen to compete in every game. He suffered a sophomore slump, but regained his freshman form in 2011 as he led all linebackers nationally with six interceptions, finishing 11th nationally regardless of position with those six picks. Finished fourth on the squad with 77 total tackles and was fourth with 8.0 tackles-for-loss. Also finished fourth on the squad with seven passes broken up and had five quarterback hurries, which was second on club. He had arguably the best season of any linebacker in Cougar history in his final season. Started all 12 games at strongside linebacker and was named first team All-Conference USA by the league's coaches and Phil Steele and received the program's Wilson Whitley Defensive Most Valuable Player award. Finished 14th nationally with 11 sacks, led Conference USA and was fourth nationally with five forced fumbles, second in Conference USA and ninth nationally with 19.5 tackles for loss. Led the Cougars and was ninth nationally with 128 total tackles and also had three interceptions, three pass breakups and one fumble recovery. He had at least 12 tackles in seven games including a career-high 16 stops at Marshall. He had multiple tackles for loss in seven games and a career-high three tackles for loss in three games and had a career-high 2.5 sacks against UAB.

== Professional career ==
Steward was signed by the St. Louis Rams after going undrafted in the 2014 NFL draft. He was released during final cuts on August 29, 2014.
