= Darryl Cato-Bishop =

American football player (born 1990)

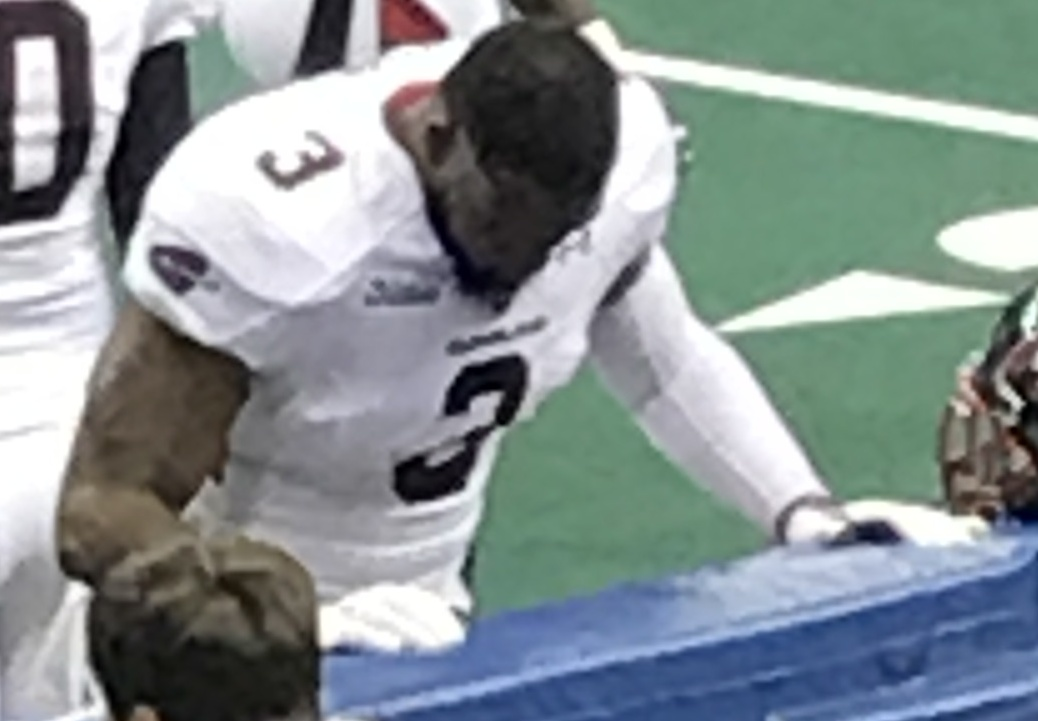
- Cato-Bishop with the Cleveland Gladiators in 2017

No. 3, 2
- Position: Defensive lineman

Personal information
- Born: January 26, 1990 (age 36); Roxbury, Massachusetts, U.S.
- Listed height: 6 ft 4 in (1.93 m)
- Listed weight: 260 lb (118 kg)

Career information
- High school: Lawrence Academy (Groton, Massachusetts)
- College: NC State
- NFL draft: 2014: undrafted

Career history
- Los Angeles KISS (2014–2015); Boston Brawlers (2014); Columbus Lions (2015)*; Orlando Predators (2016); Cleveland Gladiators (2017); Albany Empire (2018); Baltimore Brigade (2019)
- * Offseason or practice squad member only

Awards and highlights
- 2× Second Team All-Arena (2016, 2018)

Career AFL statistics
- Tackles: 59.5
- Sacks: 15
- Pass breakups: 5
- Stats at ArenaFan.com

Darryl Cato-Bishop (born January 26, 1990) is an American former professional football defensive lineman who played in the Arena Football League (AFL). He played college football at North Carolina State University in Raleigh, North Carolina. He was a member of the Los Angeles KISS, Boston Brawlers, Columbus Lions, Orlando Predators, Cleveland Gladiators, Albany Empire, and Baltimore Brigade.

== Early life ==
Cato-Bishop attended the Fessenden School in West Newton, Massachusetts, for 9th grade before finishing his high school career at Lawrence Academy in Groton, Massachusetts. He played football and basketball at Lawrence Academy.

College recruiting
Name	Hometown	School	Height	Weight	Commit date
Darryl Cato-Bishop; DE	Roxbury, Massachusetts	Lawrence Academy	6 ft 3 in (1.91 m)	238 lb (108 kg)	Nov 28, 2008
Darryl Cato-Bishop; DE	Recruit ratings: Scout: Rivals: 247Sports:				
Overall recruit ranking: Scout: 198 (DE) Rivals: -- (DE), 5 (MA)
Note: In many cases, Scout, Rivals, 247Sports, On3, and ESPN may conflict in their listings of height and weight.; In these cases, the average was taken. ESPN grades are on a 100-point scale.; Sources: "NC State Football Commitment List". Rivals.; "NC State College Football Recruiting Commits". Scout.; "Scout.com Team Recruiting Rankings". Scout.; "2009 Team Ranking". Rivals.com.

== College career ==
Cato-Bishop played for the NC State Wolfpack from 2009 to 2013. He was the team's starter his final year and helped the Wolfpack to 27 wins. He played in 48 games during his career including 28 starts at defensive end and 1 at defensive tackle.

=== Statistics ===
Year	Team	Tackles						Interceptions				
Year	Team	Solo	Ast	Total	Loss	Sacks	FF	Int	Yards	Avg	TD	PD
2009	NC State	Redshirt										
2010	NC State	6	7	13	2.0	0.0	0	0	0	--	0	0
2011	NC State	12	10	22	7.0	5.5	1	1	2	2.0	0	1
2012	NC State	20	16	36	10.5	6.5	0	0	0	--	0	1
2013	NC State	6	18	24	4.0	0.5	1	0	0	0.0	0	0
Totals		44	51	95	23.5	12.5	2	1	2	2.0	0	0

== Professional career ==
Pre-draft measurables
Height	Weight	40-yard dash	10-yard split	20-yard split	20-yard shuttle	Three-cone drill	Vertical jump	Broad jump
6 ft 2 in (1.88 m)	257 lb (117 kg)	4.96 s	1.64 s	2.84 s	4.53 s	7.43 s	29.5 in (0.75 m)	9 ft 1 in (2.77 m)
All values from NC State Pro Day

Cato-Bishop was invited to rookie mini-camp with the New York Jets, but was not offered a contract.

On June 26, 2014, Cato-Bishop was assigned to the Los Angeles KISS of the Arena Football League (AFL). He recorded two sacks in 4 games as a rookie. On September 24, 2014, the KISS picked up his rookie option.

Cato-Bishop played for the Boston Brawlers of the Fall Experimental Football League.

On November 30, 2015, he was assigned to the AFL's Orlando Predators.

Cato-Bishop was assigned to the Cleveland Gladiators of the AFL for the 2017 season.

On March 19, 2018, Cato-Bishop was assigned to the Albany Empire of the AFL.

On April 3, 2019, Cato-Bishop was assigned to the AFL's Baltimore Brigade.
