= 2015 FXFL season =

Second season of Fall Experimental Football League

The 2015 FXFL season was the second season of the Fall Experimental Football League (FXFL) and the final season of league play before it was replaced by The Spring League in 2017.

== Relocations and franchise changes ==
- The Boston Brawlers ceased operations. The team had originally announced it was relocating the team to Eastwood Field in Niles, Ohio to become the "Mahoning Valley Brawlers" but had its franchise revoked one week before the start of play.
- The Omaha Mammoths ceased operations and were replaced by the Hudson Valley Fort, who will play at Dutchess Stadium in Fishkill, New York.

With the Brawlers' sudden contraction, the league shrank from four teams to three, with the Brooklyn Bolts and traveling Florida Blacktips remaining as they were in 2014. The league's geographic footprint also shrank so that both teams with home fields are located in the state of New York.

== Coaching changes ==
- In Brooklyn, John Bock left the team. Replacing Bock was Terry Shea, who moved over from the same position with the Brawlers.
- Hudson Valley hired John Jenkins, who had previously served as coach of the Blacktips and the Ottawa Renegades of the CFL, as their head coach. Sandy Buda, who had coached the predecessor Omaha Mammoths, declined to leave Omaha. The Blacktips never announced who their head coach was for the 2015 season. Jenkins himself would quit the league midseason after not being paid, with Robert Gordon serving as the Fort's head coach for the remainder of the season.
- The Brawlers had planned to hire Rick Worman, most recently offensive coordinator for the Montreal Alouettes, as head coach before the team was contracted.

== Regular season ==
The second Blacktips/Bolts game was originally scheduled for Friday, October 30, but the game was rescheduled to one day earlier due to Game 3 the 2015 World Series, which was to be hosted by the Bolts' parent company, the New York Mets.

As was the case in the 2014 season, the last game of the season (the only matchup between the Blacktips and Hudson Valley) was canceled, and no championship was played. As a result, because the Blacktips and Hudson Valley never faced each other, it became impossible to determine a true champion; although Brooklyn technically had the better record, the Blacktips and Bolts split the two-game series between each other 1–1 and the three games' difference between them and the Blacktips was all in games against winless Hudson Valley, whom the Blacktips never got to face.

== Schedule ==
Date	Visitor	Score	Home	Score	Attendance
Friday, October 2	Blacktips	29	Brooklyn	6	est. 950
Saturday, October 3	Hudson Valley	—	Mahoning Valley	—	canceled
Saturday, October 10	Brooklyn	45	Hudson Valley	23	1,776
Thursday, October 15	Blacktips	—	Mahoning Valley	—	canceled
Saturday, October 17	Hudson Valley	9	Brooklyn	34	—
Friday, October 23 (Note: The original schedule had Brooklyn hosting Mahoning Valley on this date instead of this game.)	Brooklyn	30	Hudson Valley	6	—
Thursday, October 29	Blacktips	24	Brooklyn	31	—
Wednesday, November 4	Brooklyn	—	Mahoning Valley	—	canceled
Friday, November 6	Blacktips	—	Hudson Valley	—	canceled

== Final standings ==
Team	Wins	Losses	Win %	PF	PA	Net points	Home	Road	Streak
Brooklyn	4	1	.800	146	91	+55	2–1	2–0	W4
Blacktips	1	1	.500	53	37	+16	0–0	1–1	L1
Hudson Valley	0	3	.000	38	109	-71	0–2	0–1	L3
