= Elliott Mealer =

American football player (born 1989)

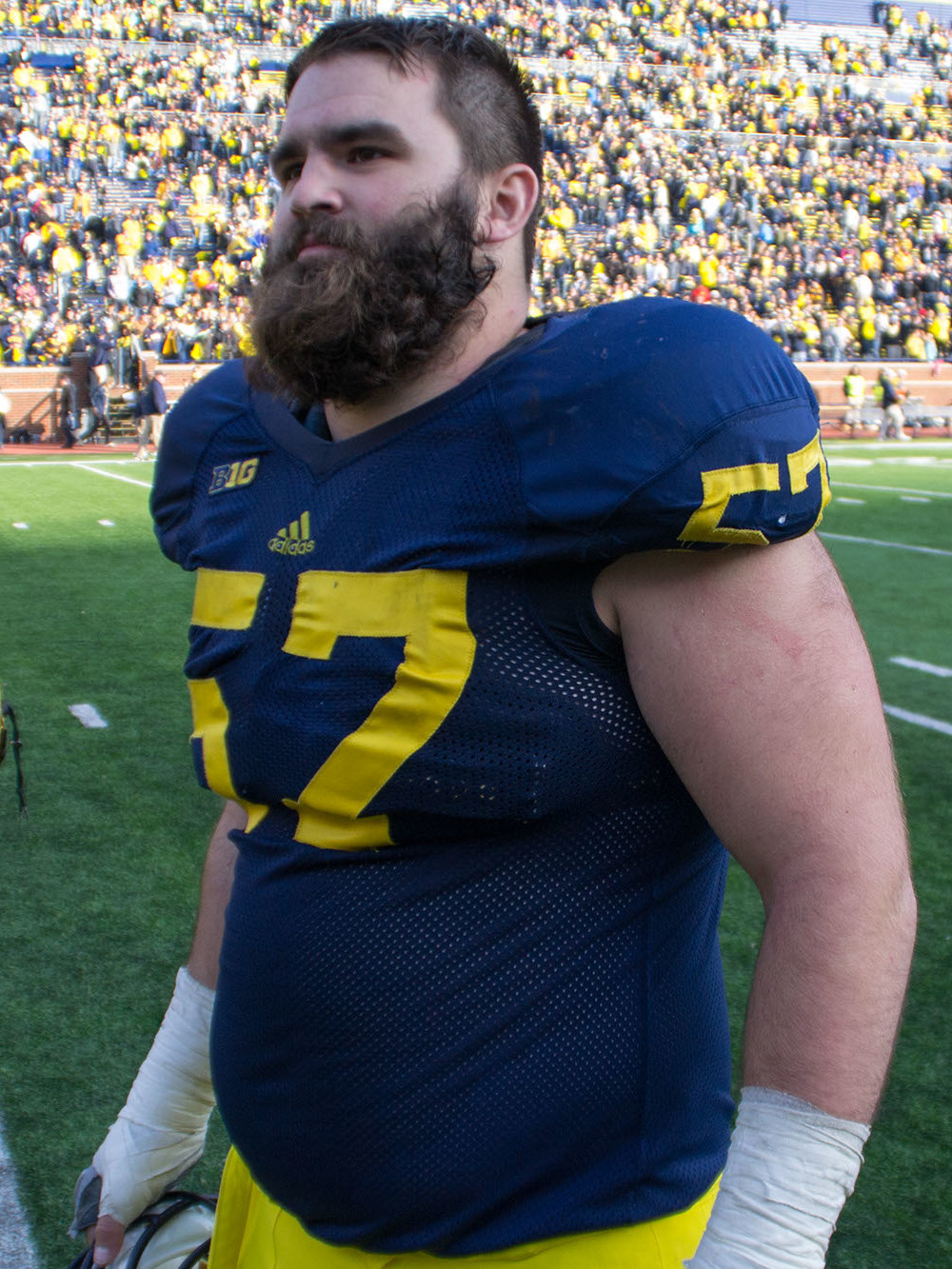
- Mealer in 2012

No. 70
- Position: Center

Personal information
- Born: June 30, 1989 (age 37)
- Listed height: 6 ft 5 in (1.96 m)
- Listed weight: 308 lb (140 kg)

Career information
- High school: Wauseon (OH)
- College: Michigan
- NFL draft: 2013: undrafted

Career history
- New Orleans Saints (2013)*; San Jose SaberCats (2014); Omaha Mammoths (2014)
- * Offseason or practice squad member only
- Stats at ArenaFan.com

Elliott Mealer (born June 30, 1989) is an American former football offensive lineman. He was a center for the Michigan Wolverines. He appeared in 50 games, making 13 starts at center. On April 27, 2013, Elliott signed a free agent contract with the New Orleans Saints.

== Early life ==
Mealer played as an offensive tackle while at Wauseon High. He was a three-year varsity starter. Rivals.com named him a PrepStar Magazine All-American and was ranked No. 24 offensive tackle in the country and 14th-best player in the state of Ohio. Scout.com named Mealer a four-star prospect and ranked him 28th-best offensive tackle prospect in the nation. During the senior year, Mealer was named Northwest Ohio Division IV Offensive Lineman of the Year.

== College career ==
After redshirting in 2008, Mealer played for the University of Michigan. He played 11 games during the 2009 season. He went on to start 13 of the 50 total games in which he played from 2009 to 2012. While in school, Mealer attended the University of Michigan's College of Literature, Science, and the Arts majoring in general studies.

== Professional career ==
As a free agent, Mealer joined the NFL on April 27, 2013, upon signing a 3-year contract with the New Orleans Saints for $1,495,000, including a guaranteed $5,000 signing bonus. Mealer was assigned to play as a guard but was released on August 31, 2013 as a result of the team's final roster cuts.

Mealer joined the Arena Football League upon signing with the San Jose SaberCats on July 5, 2014.

Mealer joined the Omaha Mammoths of the Fall Experimental Football League in 2014 however, the team ceased operations the same year.

== Acting career ==
In 2020, Mealer appeared in a Geico commercial about a baby reveal.

== Personal life ==
During December 2007, Mealer survived a car accident that killed Mealer's girlfriend and his father. Mealer's brother Brock was paralyzed from the waist down in the same accident. His brother began physical therapy with the help of former U-M strength coach Mike Barwis.
