= John Bock (American football) =

American football player (born 1971)

No. 67, 68, 60
- Positions: Center, guard

Personal information
- Born: February 11, 1971 (age 55); Crystal Lake, Illinois, U.S.
- Listed height: 6 ft 3 in (1.91 m)
- Listed weight: 295 lb (134 kg)

Career information
- High school: Crystal Lake Central
- College: Louisville; Indiana State
- NFL draft: 1994: undrafted

Career history
- Buffalo Bills (1994)*; Amsterdam Admirals (1995); New York Jets (1995); Miami Dolphins (1996–2000); Oakland Raiders (2001)*
- * Offseason or practice squad member only

Career NFL statistics
- Games played: 55
- Games started: 17
- Stats at Pro Football Reference

John Bock (born February 11, 1971, in Crystal Lake, Illinois) is an American former professional football player who was an offensive lineman for six seasons with the New York Jets and Miami Dolphins of the National Football League (NFL). He played college football for the Louisville Cardinals and Indiana State Sycamores

Bock served as Florida Atlantic University's offensive line coach from 2002 until 2004. He became the head coach for the Brooklyn Bolts in the FXFL during its inaugural season, for which he was named Coach of the Year for leading the Bolts to the league championship. Bock did not return to the FXFL for 2015.
