= Hudson Valley Fort =

New York football team

- Founded: 2015
- Folded: 2016
- League: Fall Experimental Football League (2015–2016)
- Team history: Hudson Valley Fort (2015–2016)
- Based in: Fishkill, New York
- Stadium: Dutchess Stadium
- Colors: Light Blue, Black, Silver, White
- Owner: Fall Experimental Football League; Hudson Valley Renegades
- Head coach: John Jenkins
- General manager: John Jenkins
- Championships: 0
- Conference titles: 0
- Playoff berths: 0

The Hudson Valley Fort was a team in the Fall Experimental Football League (FXFL). The team played the 2015 season at Dutchess Stadium in Fishkill, New York.

== History ==
After the 2014 season, the FXFL announced that three of its four teams would begin sharing operations with teams in the New York–Penn League, a low-end minor league baseball circuit in the northeastern United States. One of those teams, the Brooklyn Bolts, already fit that description, but the other three did not. Initially, it was assumed that the two other teams would be the Blacktips (a traveling team that had been unable to play in its originally announced home state of Florida) and the Boston Brawlers, who had the worst attendance, and that the Bolts and Omaha Mammoths (who had by far the league's best attendance and were also an on-field success) would remain in their cities. Indeed, the Brawlers would relocate to Ohio and become the Mahoning Valley Brawlers that offseason, later being forced out of the league before the 2015 season began. However, in a somewhat surprise move, the league decided to keep the Blacktips and fold the Mammoths, claiming that the team would have had to sell even more tickets than they did to offset the travel costs.

The Hudson Valley Fort were announced as members of the league on August 6, 2015. As with the Bolts and Brawlers, the Fort was operated as a joint venture with the local NYPL franchise, the Hudson Valley Renegades. On September 23, the Fort announced via Facebook that former Blacktips head coach, John Jenkins, would be the new general manager and head coach for 2015. Jenkins and several players quit the team midseason due to lack of payment, water and access to trainers; Robert Gordon replaced Jenkins for what would be the team's final two game. Wayne Anderson Jr. would take over as offensive coordinator for the remainder of the season. The league canceled the Fort's final game against the Blacktips, with the league citing the NFL trade deadline and independent observers noting that Dutchess Stadium had major safety concerns in its football configuration and that the Blacktips were largely a paper team consisting of whoever the league could sign for any particular game.

On the field, the Fort played only three games, all blowout losses to the Brooklyn Bolts. Two of the contests were held at Dutchess Stadium, the first drawing an alleged (and patriotic) 1,776 fans; the second game's attendance was not recorded, but was believed to be no more than a few hundred. (Only two other games were played in the FXFL that season, the others being the Bolts against the traveling Blacktips team.) The Fort's final home game, against the Blacktips, was cancelled; citing safety concerns, three high-school playoff games scheduled for Dutchess were also nixed.

As the owner of Dutchess Stadium, Dutchess County held veto power over whether the Fort would return for the 2016 season, had the league survived. The county only offered the league a one-year "pilot" lease on the stadium; county executive Marcus Molinaro would have reviewed the results of the 2015 season before deciding if they would offer another lease. The league never returned for the 2016 season, rendering the decision moot.

== Schedule ==
Date	Visitor	Score	Home	Score	Attendance
Saturday, October 3	Hudson Valley	—	Mahoning Valley	—	canceled
Saturday, October 10	Brooklyn	45	Hudson Valley	23	1,776
Saturday, October 17	Hudson Valley	9	Brooklyn	34	—
Friday, October 23 (Note: The original schedule had Brooklyn hosting Mahoning Valley on this date instead of this game.)	Brooklyn	30	Hudson Valley	6	—
Friday, November 6	Blacktips	—	Hudson Valley	—	canceled
