= Nate Dreiling =

American football player and coach (born 1990)

Current position
- Title: Inside linebackers coach
- Team: Oklahoma
- Conference: SEC

Biographical details
- Born: October 27, 1990 (age 36); Victoria, Kansas, U.S.

Playing career
- 2009–2013: Pittsburg State
- 2014: Green Bay Packers
- 2014: Kansas City Chiefs
- 2014: Omaha Mammoths
- Position: Linebacker

Coaching career (HC unless noted)
- 2015–2016: Kansas (GA)
- 2017: Pittsburg State (S)
- 2018–2019: Pittsburg State (DC)
- 2020: Oregon (defensive analyst)
- 2021: Southeast Missouri State (defensive RGC / MLB)
- 2022–2023: New Mexico State (DC)
- 2024: Utah State (interim HC / DC)
- 2025–present: Oklahoma (ILB)

Head coaching record
- Overall: 4–8

Accomplishments and honors

Awards
- DII National Defensive Player of the Year (2011); 4× First-team DII All-American (2010–2013); MIAA Defensive Player of the Year (2011); MIAA Freshman of the Year (2010); 4× First-team All-MIAA (2010–2013)

Nate Dreiling (born October 27, 1990) is an American football coach and former player who currently serves as the inside linebacker coach at University of Oklahoma, a position he has held since 2025. He was previously the interim head football coach and defensive coordinator at Utah State University in 2024. He also served as the defensive coordinator at New Mexico State University from 2022 to 2023.

Dreiling played college football at Pittsburg State University as a linebacker from 2009 to 2013. He signed with the Green Bay Packers of the National Football League (NFL) as an undrafted free agent in 2014. Dreiling held various assistant coaching positions at the University of Kansas, Pittsburg State, the University of Oregon, Southeast Missouri State University and New Mexico State.

== Playing career ==
=== College ===
Dreiling played for the Pittsburg State Gorillas as a linebacker from 2009 to 2013, where he helped the Gorillas win the NCAA Division II National Championship in 2011.

=== Professional ===
In 2014, Dreiling signed with the Green Bay Packers as an undrafted free agent. After being released by the Packers, he signed with the Kansas City Chiefs. He also played for the Omaha Mammoths of the Fall Experimental Football League (FXFL).

== Coaching career ==
=== Early career ===
Dreiling began his coaching career as a graduate assistant at the University of Kansas in 2015.

=== Pittsburg State ===
In 2017, Dreiling was hired as the safeties coach at his alma mater Pittsburg State. In 2018, he was promoted to defensive coordinator.

=== Oregon ===
In 2020, Dreiling joined the University of Oregon as a defensive analyst under head coach Mario Cristobal.

=== Southeast Missouri State ===
In 2021, Dreiling was hired as the defensive run game coordinator and middle linebackers coach at Southeast Missouri State University under head coach Tom Matukewicz.

=== New Mexico State ===
In 2022, Dreiling joined New Mexico State University as their defensive coordinator under head coach Jerry Kill.

=== Utah State ===
In 2024, Dreiling was hired as the defensive coordinator at Utah State University.

On July 2, 2024, then-head coach Blake Anderson was placed on administrative leave and formally fired 16 days later; Dreiling was named interim head coach in Anderson's place.

=== Arkansas State ===
On January 3, 2025, Dreiling was named the defensive coordinator at Arkansas State University.

=== Oklahoma ===
Less than a month later on February 1, 2025, Dreiling was hired by head coach Brent Venables to be the inside linebackers coach at Oklahoma.

== Personal life ==
Dreiling and his wife, Alexa, have three children. His father, Randy Dreiling, is a decorated high school football and holds the Kansas state record for state championships as a head coach with 10.

== Head coaching record ==
Year	Team	Overall	Conference	Standing	Bowl/playoffs
Utah State Aggies (Mountain West Conference) (2024)
2024	Utah State	4–8	3–4	T–5th	
Utah State:		4–8	3–4		
Total:		4–8			
