= Sandy Buda =

American football coach

Biographical details
- Born: c. 1945

Playing career

Football
- 1964–1966: Kansas

Baseball
- 1965–1967: Kansas
- Positions: End, quarterback (football); First baseman (baseball)

Coaching career (HC unless noted)

Football
- 1967–1974: Kansas (assistant)
- 1975–1977: Kansas State (DL)
- 1978–1989: Nebraska–Omaha
- 2000–2003: Omaha Beef
- 2014: Omaha Mammoths

Head coaching record
- Overall: 84–49
- Tournaments: 1–2 (NCAA D-II playoffs)

Accomplishments and honors

Championships
- 2 NCC (1983–1984)

Santo Buda (born c. 1945) is an American former football coach. He served as the head football coach at the University of Nebraska Omaha from 1978 to 1989, compiling a record of 84–49, the Omaha Beef of the National Indoor Football League from 2000 to 2003 and the Omaha Mammoths of the Fall Experimental Football League during that team's lone season in 2014. Buda attended Creighton Preparatory School in Omaha, Nebraska. He played college football and college baseball at the University of Kansas, before graduating in 1967.

== Head coaching record ==
Year	Team	Overall	Conference	Standing	Bowl/playoffs
Nebraska–Omaha Mavericks (North Central Conference) (1978–1989)
1978	Nebraska–Omaha	8–3	4–1–1	2nd	L NCAA Division II First Round
1979	Nebraska–Omaha	8–3	3–3	T–4th	
1980	Nebraska–Omaha	7–3	5–2	T–2nd	
1981	Nebraska–Omaha	5–6	3–4	5th	
1982	Nebraska–Omaha	6–5	3–4	5th	
1983	Nebraska–Omaha	9–2	8–1	T–1st	
1984	Nebraska–Omaha	11–2	8–1	T–1st	L NCAA Division II Semifinal
1985	Nebraska–Omaha	6–5	4–5	T–6th	
1986	Nebraska–Omaha	5–6	4–5	T–6th	
1987	Nebraska–Omaha	7–4	5–4	T–4th	
1988	Nebraska–Omaha	6–5	4–5	T–6th	
1989	Nebraska–Omaha	6–5	5–4	T–4th	
Nebraska–Omaha:		84–49	56–39–1		
Total:		84–49			
National championship Conference title Conference division title or championship game berth

=== IPFL/NIFL ===
Team	Year	Regular season					Postseason			
Team	Year	Won	Lost	Ties	Win %	Finish	Won	Lost	Win %	Result
OMA	2000	8	8	0	.500	3rd in IPFL	0	1	.000	Lost to Mississippi Fire Dogs in Semifinal
OMA	2001	15	1	0	.938	1st in IPFL	0	1	.000	Lost to Tennessee ThunderCats in 2001 IPFL Championship Game
OMA	2002	9	6	0	.643	2nd in Pacific Northern	0	1	.000	Lost to Bismarck Roughriders in Divisional Round
OMA	2003	12	4	0	.750	1st in Pacific Northern	1	1	.500	Lost to Utah Warriors in Pacific Conference Championship
Total		44	19	0	.698		1	4	.200	

=== FXFL ===
Team	Year	Regular season					Postseason			
Team	Year	Won	Lost	Ties	Win %	Finish	Won	Lost	Win %	Result
OMA	2014	3	1	0	.750	2nd in FXFL	–	–	–	–
Total		3	1	0	.750		0	0	.000	
