= Brandon Ford =

American football player (born 1989)

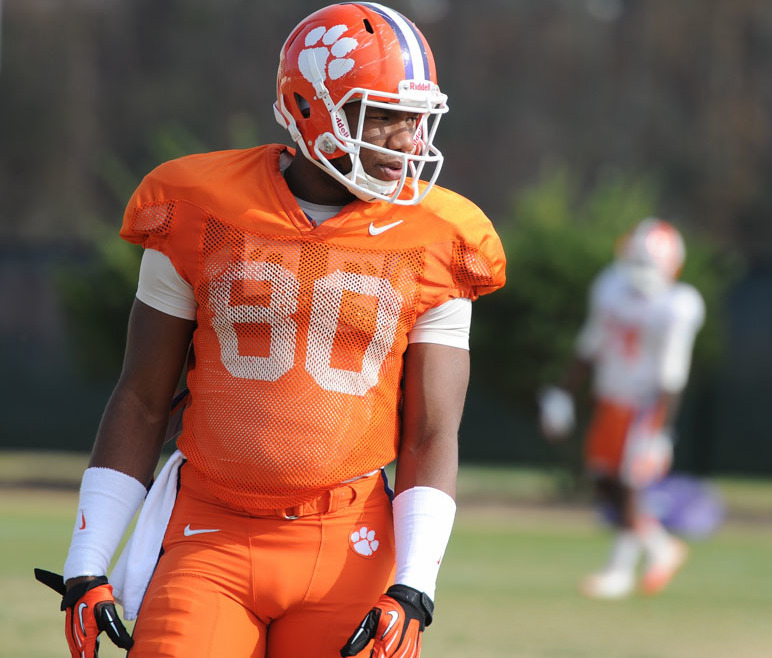
- Ford with the Clemson Tigers (2008–'12).

No. 88
- Position: Tight end

Personal information
- Born: December 31, 1989 (age 36)
- Listed height: 6 ft 3 in (1.91 m)
- Listed weight: 240 lb (109 kg)

Career information
- College: Clemson
- NFL draft: 2013: undrafted

Career history
- New England Patriots (2013)*; Boston Brawlers (2014)
- * Offseason or practice squad member only

Awards and highlights
- First-team All-ACC (2012); 2019 Fall CFFL D1 Champions; 2020 Fall CFFL D1 Champions

Brandon Ford (born December 31, 1989) is an American former professional football tight end. He was signed as an undrafted free agent by the New England Patriots in 2013. He played college football for Clemson from 2008 to 2012.

== Early life ==
Ford graduated from Hanahan High School in South Carolina in 2008.

== College career ==
Ford redshirted in 2009 before contributing in a limited capacity in 2009, catching one pass for four yards over the course of 28 offensive snaps. As a sophomore, Ford's role increased, as he caught ten passes for 78 yards over 123 snaps. As a junior, Ford started one game, collecting 14 receptions for 166 yards and two touchdowns over 222 snaps. He was named to the ACC Academic Honor Roll in each of his first three seasons. As a senior, Ford was a First-team All-ACC selection by both media and coaches after catching 40 passes for 480 yards and eight touchdowns, starting all thirteen games and playing 695 snaps.

== Professional career ==
=== Clemson Pro Day ===
Pre-draft measurables
Height	Weight	40-yard dash	10-yard split	20-yard split	20-yard shuttle	Three-cone drill	Vertical jump	Broad jump	Bench press
6 ft 3 3/8 in (1.91 m)	245 lb (111 kg)	4.74 s	1.73 s	2.72 s	4.67 s	7.13 s	37 in (0.94 m)	9 ft 10 in (3.00 m)	17 reps
All values from Clemson Pro Day

=== New England Patriots ===
On April 27, 2013, he was signed as an undrafted free agent by the New England Patriots. On August 12, 2013, he was waived by the Patriots. On the next day, he cleared waivers and was placed on the Patriots' injured reserve list. On August 17, 2013, he was released by the Patriots.

=== Boston Brawlers ===
Ford signed with the Boston Brawlers of the Fall Experimental Football League (FXFL) in 2014.
