= John Harris (wide receiver) =

American gridiron football player (born 1991)

No. 9
- Position: Wide receiver / Slotback

Personal information
- Born: November 11, 1991 (age 34); Dallas, Texas, U.S.
- Listed height: 6 ft 2 in (1.88 m)
- Listed weight: 218 lb (99 kg)

Career information
- High school: Garland (TX) Naaman Forest
- College: Texas
- NFL draft: 2015: undrafted

Career history
- Philadelphia Eagles (2015)*; Atlanta Falcons (2015)*; Brooklyn Bolts (2015); Ottawa Redblacks (2016); Edmonton Eskimos (2017)*
- * Offseason or practice squad member only

Awards and highlights
- Grey Cup champion (2016); Second-team All-Big 12 (2014)
- Stats at CFL.ca

John Harris (born November 11, 1991) is an American former professional football wide receiver. He played college football at Texas. He has been a member of the Philadelphia Eagles, Atlanta Falcons, Brooklyn Bolts (FXFL), Ottawa Redblacks (CFL) and Edmonton Eskimos (CFL).

== College career ==
Harris redshirted his first year with the Texas Longhorns. In 2011 and 2012, he suffered through a series of injuries which limited his play time. In 2014, Harris had a breakout final season with Texas, and was their leading receiver with more than 1,000 receiving yards.

== Professional career ==
After going undrafted in the 2015 NFL draft, Harris signed with the Philadelphia Eagles.

Harris signed with the Ottawa Redblacks of the Canadian Football League (CFL) on May 25, 2016. Harris spent most of the 2016 season on the Redblacks practice roster, before playing in the final game of the regular season, catching 3 passes for 28 yards. He was released by the Redblacks on May 1, 2017, as they trimmed their roster down to 75 players. On May 11, 2017, Harris signed with the Edmonton Eskimos of the CFL, ahead of the team's training camp.
