= Tysyn Hartman =

American football player (born 1989)

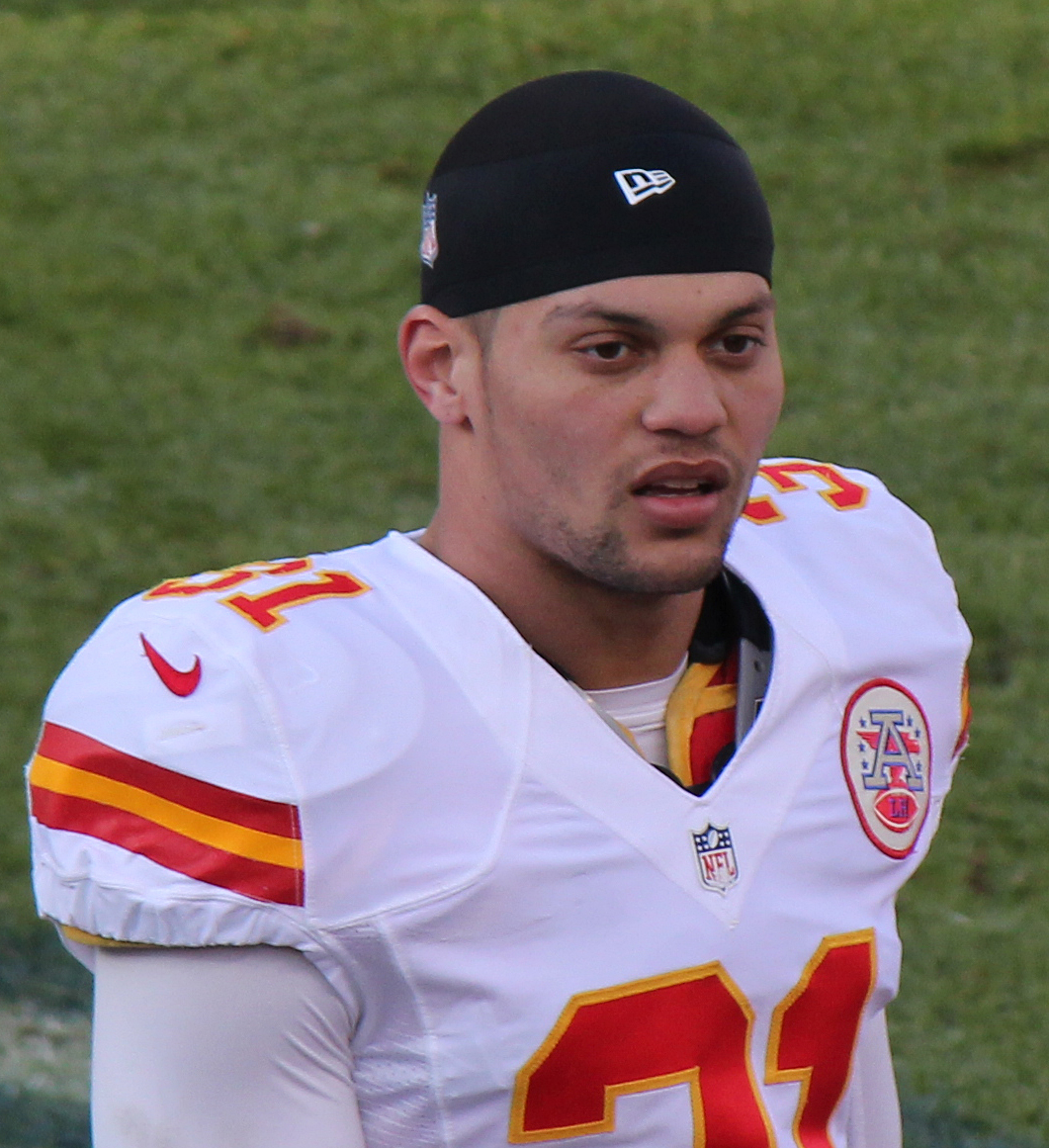
- Hartman with the Kansas City Chiefs in 2012

No. 31
- Position: Safety

Personal information
- Born: August 9, 1989 (age 37); Hays, Kansas, U.S.
- Listed height: 6 ft 3 in (1.91 m)
- Listed weight: 206 lb (93 kg)

Career information
- High school: Kapaun Mt. Carmel (Wichita, Kansas)
- College: Kansas State
- NFL draft: 2012: undrafted

Career history
- Kansas City Chiefs (2012); Omaha Mammoths (2014)

Awards and highlights
- Second-team All-Big 12 (2011)

Career NFL statistics
- Total tackles: 24
- Pass deflections: 3
- Stats at Pro Football Reference

Tysyn Hartman (born August 9, 1989) is an American former professional football player who was a safety for the Kansas City Chiefs of the National Football League (NFL). Hartman was signed as an undrafted free agent by the Chiefs in 2012. He also played for the Omaha Mammoths of the Fall Experimental Football League (FXFL). He played college football for the Kansas State Wildcats. He attended high school at Kapaun Mt. Carmel Catholic High School in Wichita, Kansas.
