= Craig Roh =

American football player (1991–2024)

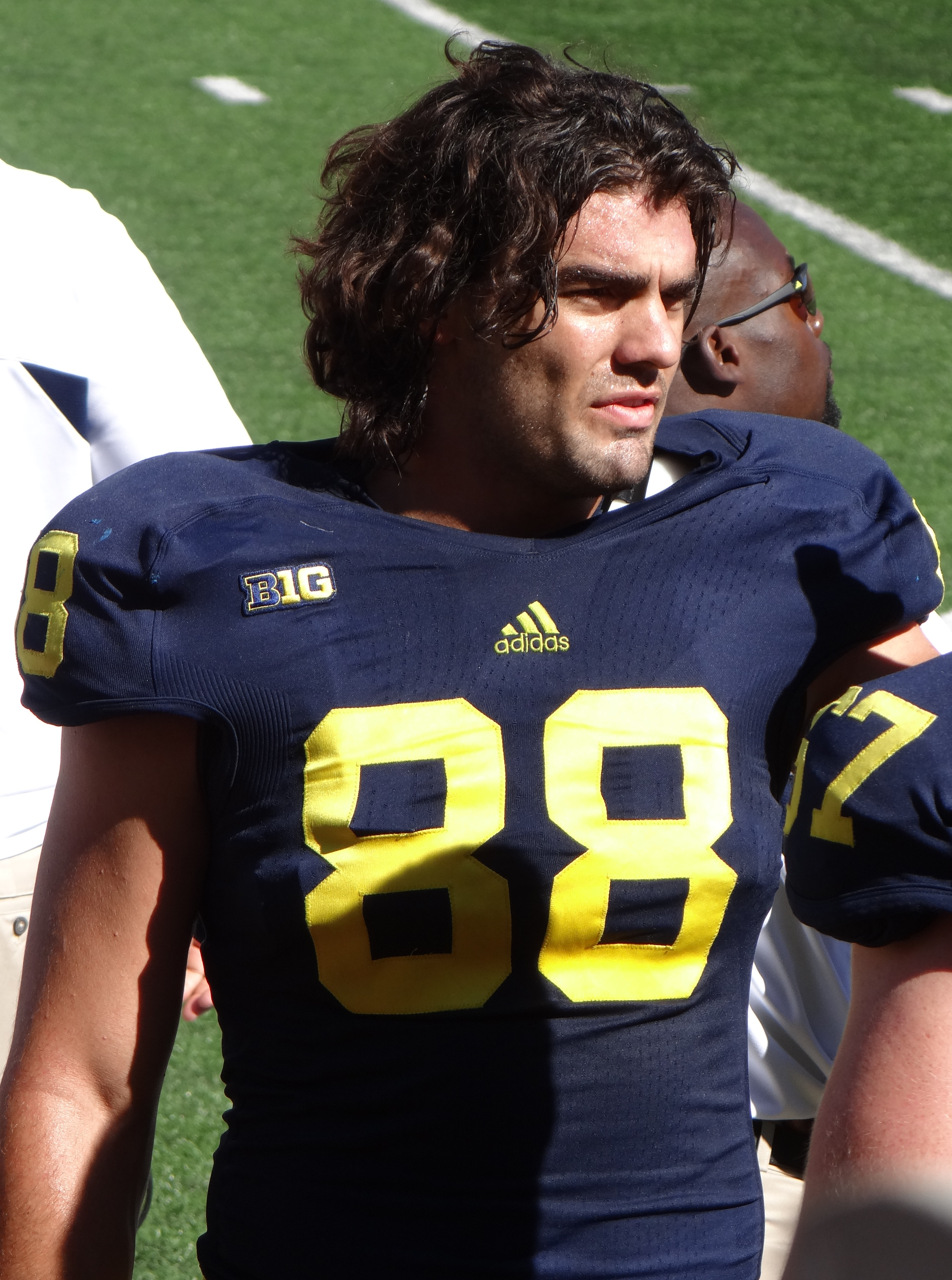
- Roh with the Michigan Wolverines in 2012

No. 93
- Position: Defensive end

Personal information
- Born: January 25, 1991; Scottsdale, Arizona, U.S.
- Died: February 26, 2024 (aged 33)
- Listed height: 6 ft 5 in (1.96 m)
- Listed weight: 266 lb (121 kg)

Career information
- High school: Chaparral (Scottsdale)
- College: Michigan
- NFL draft: 2013: undrafted

Career history
- Carolina Panthers (2013–2014)*; Omaha Mammoths (2014); BC Lions (2015–2017); Winnipeg Blue Bombers (2018–2019); Toronto Argonauts (2020–2021)
- * Offseason or practice squad member only

Awards and highlights
- Gatorade Player of the Year in Arizona, 2008–09; Curley Culp Award (outstanding defensive lineman in Arizona), 2008; 2009 Scholar-Athlete Award from the College Football Hall of Fame.; Second-team All-Big Ten (2012); 2014 FXFL All-Star; Grey Cup champion (2019)
- Stats at Pro Football Reference
- Stats at CFL.ca

Craig Robert Roh (January 25, 1991 – February 26, 2024) was an American professional football player who was a defensive end in the National Football League (NFL) and Canadian Football League (CFL). He was the Gatorade Player of the Year in Arizona for the 2008–2009 academic year and received the 2009 Scholar-Athlete Award from the College Football Hall of Fame. He played college football for the Michigan Wolverines beginning in 2009, starting all 12 games at the "hybrid linebacker" position as a true freshman. He earned second-team all-conference honors in the Big Ten in 2012.

== Early life ==
Roh grew up in Scottsdale, Arizona. His father, Fred Roh, played basketball at Grand Valley State University in Allendale, Michigan. Roh attended Paradise Valley Christian Prep for junior high, and also attended Chaparral High School in Scottsdale, where he was a member of the varsity football and basketball teams. He was a standout at the defensive end position for the Chaparral football team. As a junior in 2007, Roh recorded 99 tackles, 45 tackles for loss and two fumble recoveries. As a senior in 2008, he recorded 140 tackles, 56 tackles for loss, 16.5 sacks, one interception, and two fumble recoveries. He broke the school record for sacks in both years. He also helped lead Chaparral to the Arizona Class 4A-I state championship game in 2008.

Roh was selected by The Arizona Republic and East Valley Tribune as a first-team All-Arizona player as a junior and again as a senior. He was also named the Gatorade Player of the Year in Arizona and received the Curley Culp Award as the outstanding defensive lineman in Arizona. With a high school grade point average of 4.3, he was also selected for the 2009 Scholar-Athlete Award from the College Football Hall of Fame.

== Recruiting ==
During his senior year, Roh became one of the most highly recruited high school football players in the United States. He was rated by ESPN.com as the fourth-best defensive end and the No. 48 player in the nation at all positions. Scout.com rated him as the eighth-best defensive end and the No. 67 overall player in the nation. Rivals.com rated him as the seventh-best defensive end, the No. 156 overall player, and the No. 3 quickest first step among defensive ends.

With his combination of size (6 feet, 5 inches, and 230 pounds), strength (bench press of 280 pounds, squat of 400 pounds) and speed (4.675 in the 40-yard dash), Roh received scholarship offers from many of the major college football programs, including Arizona, Arizona State, Cal, Nebraska, Stanford, UCLA, and USC. In late August 2008, Roh made an official visit to the University of Michigan. He announced his commitment to Michigan three weeks later on September 19, 2008.

In January 2009, Roh played as a defensive end in the Under Armour All-America Game in Orlando, Florida, recording a sack and several quarterback hurries.

== University of Michigan ==
=== 2009 season ===
==== Roh earns starting role as a true freshman ====
Roh enrolled in Michigan's College of Literature, Science and the Arts and joined the football team for summer practice in August 2009. He impressed the coaching staff during summer practice and earned a spot in the starting lineup as a true freshman. His speed and athleticism were attributes that drew the coaches' attention. Michigan's tailback, Carlos Brown, described seeing the big freshman running by his side, and keeping up. Brown added, "He turned around and looked at me, and I said, 'That's Craig Roh running with me right down the field?' It's ridiculous. He's real fast."

Michigan head coach Rich Rodriguez said that Roh had adapted so quickly that it was tough to deny him. Rodriguez added, "Probably for me, it was the one-on-one pass-rush drills that they did against the varsity or upperclass offensive linemen. He was a handful for those guys to block. . . . [H]e's a hard worker that wants to be great – he doesn't want to be good, he wants to be great. I'm excited to see what he's going to do." Michigan offensive tackle Stephen Schilling confirmed that Roh had "given some of the older guys some fits."

==== The "hybrid linebacker" position ====
Roh started all 12 games for Michigan in 2009, playing at a position variously called the "quick" or "hybrid linebacker". Roh describe his role as follows: "I'm that hybrid type of position. Half linebacker, half defensive lineman." The position requires Roh to be versatile, with duties that vary from rushing the quarterback to dropping into pass coverage or filling a gap. Roh said that his favorite thing to do is sack the quarterback. He told one interviewer, "I love hitting the quarterback. I love it! When I get there it's . . . there's nothing like it." But Roh emphasized in interviews that he enjoyed the hybrid role. He told The Detroit News: "I love the versatility of (my position). It makes me a more complete football player."

==== Success as a freshman ====
After Roh's first start, Coach Rodriguez said of him, "He's got a high motor, he's a guy who loves football, he plays so hard on every snap." Michigan's All-American defensive lineman Brandon Graham added, "Oh, I seen Craig Roh out there, you know, sticking his nose in there, and he did good for today and all he can do is get better."

Roh was named Michigan's defensive player of the game in the third game of the season, a 45–17 victory over Eastern Michigan. Roh had seven tackles, including a tackle for loss, assisted on a sack and recorded his first collegiate interception late in the third quarter.

Roh and quarterback Tate Forcier were the only two freshmen to start all 12 games for Michigan during the 2009 season. For the season, Roh had 37 tackles, including 7.5 tackles for loss, two sacks, one interception, and three pass breakups. At the conclusion of the 2008 football season, Roh was named to the Sporting News Freshman All-Big Ten team. He was also selected as a Freshman All-American honorable mention by College Football News.

=== 2010 season ===
==== Weight gain and spring practice ====
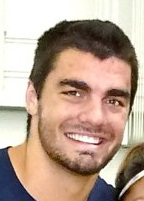
Roh in June 2011

During the offseason, Roh gained 20 pounds to increase his weight to 251 pounds. In an interview with ESPN.com's Adam Rittenberg, Roh described himself as "tiny" among Big Ten defensive linemen. Accordingly, he spent the offseason bulking up in the weight room and "followed a diet most people would dream about: six meals and more than 4,000 calories a day." Roh told Rittenberg, "I have crazy metabolism, and putting on weight was tough for me. It's something I've really got to concentrate on. Some meals, you're like, 'I really don't want to eat this right now,' but you have to."

During spring practice, Roh again impressed the coaching staff. Michigan's defensive coordinator Greg Robinson mentioned Roh as one of the players who had "stepped up" in the spring camp. He was identified as one of the players who "could be counted on to at least partially fill [Brandon] Graham's role of chasing the quarterback." AnnArbor.com cited him as one of the "Top 5 revelations" from spring practice and concluded that "he appears ready to take over as Michigan's top pass rusher next year." Roh himself acknowledged, "I'm a guy that's expected to perform this year. BG [Graham] was just an amazing player, and I feel like in some sense I need to replace what he's done."

Shortly before the 2010 season opener, The Michigan Daily and the Bleacher Report web site referred to him as Craig "Death" Roh. The Detroit News also published a profile on Roh under the headline, "Bulked-up linebacker Craig Roh to anchor young U-M defense." Defensive coordinator Greg Robinson said at the time, "Craig is just another year into it. He showed versatility last year, now he's a little bigger, a little stronger, a little smarter about everything that's going on. He's a real good football player."

==== Development as team leader ====
In the first two games of the 2010 season, Roh began to establish himself as a team leader. Roh recorded five tackles and two tackles for loss in Michigan's season opener, a 30–10 win against Connecticut. One writer praised Roh's performance as follows

Denard Robinson stole the spotlight during the Wolverines' opener on Saturday, but don't be fooled into thinking that Roh wasn't just as exciting to watch, even without the ball in his hands. One could be forgiven for losing track of Roh because he lined up all over the field. From the five technique to outside linebacker to middle linebacker, playing both in a three-point stance and with his hand off the ground, Roh was very rarely in the same spot twice.

After the Connecticut game, Roh told reporters, "Last year, we weren't good, so this year we wanted to come out and make a statement." He was also an outspoken defender of Michigan's embattled head coach, Rich Rodriguez. Following the Connecticut game, he told reporters: "He's had more on him than any other coach in the USA. He's just stayed so positive, and he's just kept his eyes toward the goal. To get this win right here, it's a stepping stone to what greater things can happen this season."

After a 28–24 win against Notre Dame, Roh spoke publicly about the character of the Michigan team. He noted that the team had adopted the battle cry "Hoka Hey," a Lakota phrase that traces its roots back to Oglala Lakota Chief Crazy Horse. Roh told reporters that the chant translates as "it's a great day to die." Roh noted that the chant had become a rallying cry for the team: "They literally aren't going to die. It's sacrifice for your teammate. It's the whole team. We're relying on the offense; the offense is relying on us. We all count on each other and would take a bullet for each other."

Asked about the success of his fellow sophomore Denard Robinson, Roh recalled having to chase him through spring practice and noted it was nice having someone else chase him. Roh added, "I had to chase that guy all spring and let me tell you, it's not easy catching that guy."

=== 2011 season ===
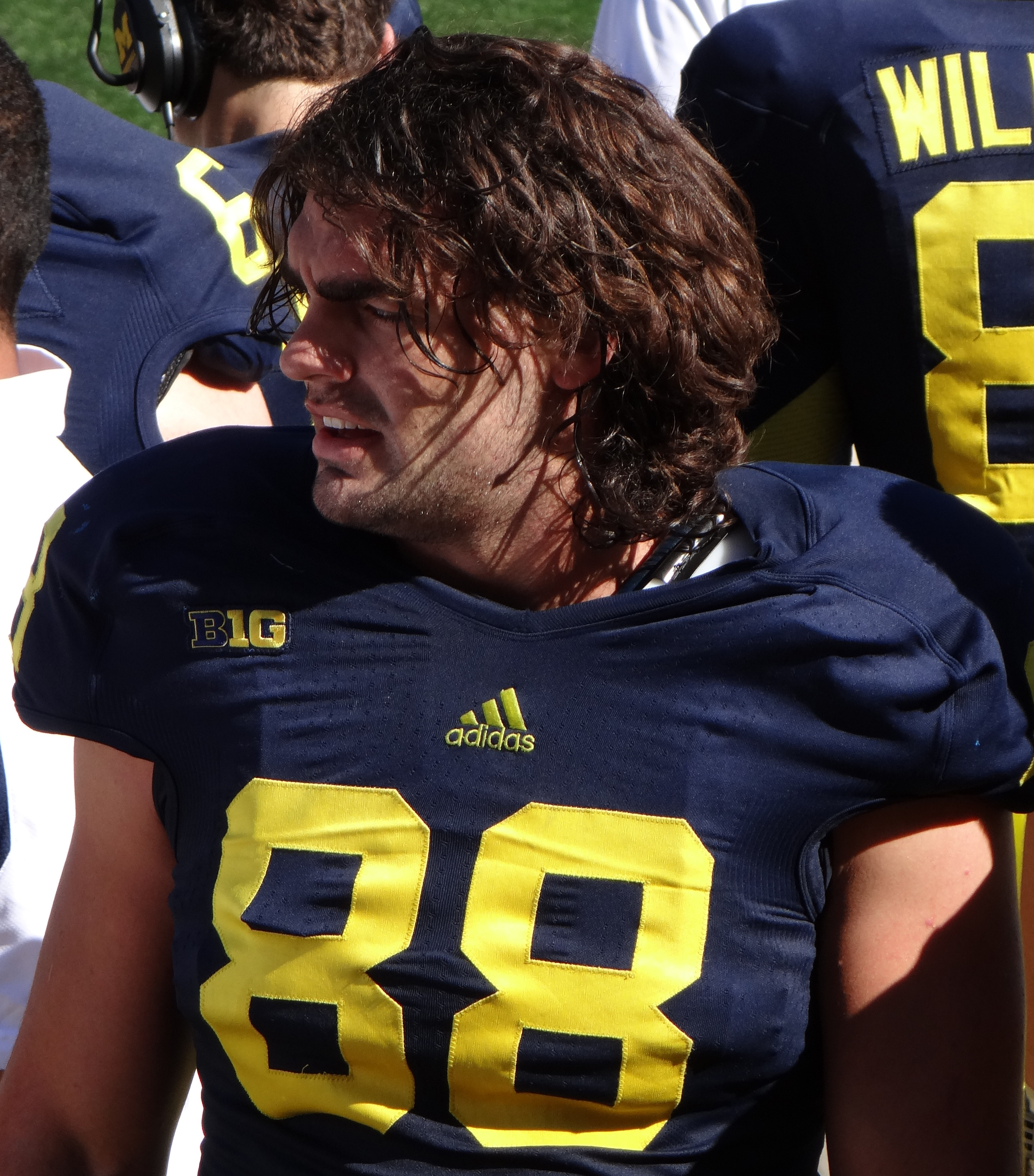
Roh at UMass game

As a junior, Roh was moved to defensive end. After contracting a respiratory infection over the summer, Roh's performance suffered in the early games of the 2011 season. He came under criticism from Michigan's new defensive coordinator, Greg Mattison. After Roh appeared lifeless during a telephone conversation, his father flew from Arizona to Ann Arbor. They spent two days in Roh's apartment assessing where he was in life and football and reviewing Bible verses. During the visit with his father, Roh reported having an epiphany, and Michigan's coaching staff saw a turnaround in Roh's performance. Through the first seven games of the 2011 season, Roh had 13 solo tackles and seven assists. He led the team with 6.5 tackles for loss and was second on the team with 2.5 sacks. Following the 2011 Big Ten Conference football season, he earned All-Big Ten Conference honorable mention recognition from the media.

=== 2012 season ===
Roh was an All-Big Ten second-team selection by the coaches and honorable mention selection by the media as well as the Richard Katcher Award winner, given to Michigan's best defensive lineman each season. He earned Academic All-Big Ten recognition in 2012.

== Professional career ==
After going undrafted during the 2013 NFL draft, Roh was signed as a free agent by the Carolina Panthers. He was released on August 24, 2014.

Roh played for the BC Lions in the Canadian Football League during the 2015, 2016, and 2017 seasons. In those 3 years, Roh played in 45 games for BC, and recorded 64 tackles to go along with 6 sacks in 2015, 7 sacks and one forced fumble in 2016, and 7 more sacks in 2017. In the 2018 season, Roh was a member of the Winnipeg Blue Bombers where he set career highs in games played with 17, tackles with 30, and sacks with 8. Roh also put up 4 tackles and a sack in the playoffs. In 2019, Roh finished the regular season injured, with a career low 12 games played; he still put up 16 tackles, 6 sacks, and 3 forced fumbles.

== Death ==
On February 28, 2024, Roh's wife, Chelsea, announced that Roh had died from colon cancer on February 26. He was 33.
