= JoJo Dickson =

American football player (born 1989)

No. 52, 34
- Position: Linebacker

Personal information
- Born: July 13, 1989 (age 37); Wailuku, Hawaii, U.S.
- Listed height: 6 ft 1 in (1.85 m)
- Listed weight: 245 lb (111 kg)

Career information
- High school: Wailuku (HI) Baldwin
- College: Idaho
- NFL draft: 2011: undrafted

Career history
- Jacksonville Jaguars (2011–2012)*; Cleveland Browns (2012)*; Omaha Nighthawks (2012); New York Jets (2012–2013)*; Arizona Cardinals (2013–2014)*; Omaha Mammoths (2014); Kansas City Chiefs (2014–2015)*; BC Lions (2015–2016)
- * Offseason or practice squad member only
- Stats at Pro Football Reference

Joseph Dickson (born July 13, 1989) is an American former professional football linebacker. He was signed by the Jacksonville Jaguars as an undrafted free agent in 2011. He played college football at Idaho.

He was also a member of the Cleveland Browns, Omaha Nighthawks, New York Jets, Arizona Cardinals, Omaha Mammoths, Kansas City Chiefs and BC Lions.

== Professional career ==
Pre-draft measurables
Height	Weight	40-yard dash	10-yard split	20-yard split	20-yard shuttle	Three-cone drill	Vertical jump	Broad jump	Bench press
6 ft 1 3/8 in (1.86 m)	245 lb (111 kg)	4.75 s	1.59 s	2.68 s	4.22 s	7.37 s	35.5 in (0.90 m)	9 ft 7 in (2.92 m)	36 reps
All values from Pro Day

=== Jacksonville Jaguars ===
Dickson signed with the Jacksonville Jaguars following the 2011 NFL draft as a rookie free agent. He was waived on July 31, 2011, to make room for punter Matt Turk. He was signed on April 16, 2012. He was waived on April 27, 2012.

=== Cleveland Browns ===
The Cleveland Browns signed him on May 14, 2012, but waived him on August 26, 2012.

=== Omaha Nighthawks ===
In 2012, he went to training camp with the Omaha Nighthawks.

=== New York Jets ===
Dickson was signed to the New York Jets' practice squad on December 10, 2012. He was signed to a future/reserve contract on December 31, 2012. He was released on August 31, 2013.

=== Arizona Cardinals ===
Dickson later signed with the Arizona Cardinals practice squad, being released on December 23, 2013. He was signed to a future contract for 2014 by the Arizona Cardinals on January 16, 2014. The Cardinals released Dickson again on August 25, 2014.

=== Kansas City Chiefs ===
Dickson signed with the Kansas City Chiefs on December 30, 2014.

=== BC Lions ===
On September 1, 2015, Dickson signed with the BC Lions
