= University Christian School =

Location
- 5520 University Blvd W Jacksonville, (Duval County), Florida 32216; United States; 30°18′33″N 81°38′26″W

Information
- Type: Private, Coeducational
- Religious affiliation: Christian
- Denomination: Baptist
- Established: 1973
- Founder: Jack J. Dinsbeer (Former Pastor of University Baptist Church)
- Superintendent: Pastor Frank Ciresi
- President: Frank Ciresi
- Dean: John Sirmon
- Principal: Beverly Bandy (Upper School)
- Head of school: Heath Nivens
- Grades: pre-school–12
- Age: 6 weeks+
- Average class size: apx. 35 students
- Classes offered: K3-12
- Hours in school day: apx.7
- Campus: Lower Socially Economic Suburban
- Campus size: .9 acres (0.36 ha)
- Colors: Blue, Vegas Gold, and White
- Slogan: "Truth, Tradition, Transformation"
- Sports: football, baseball, basketball, soccer, cross country, track, wrestling and golf
- Mascot: Christian Knight
- Team name: "Fighting Christians"
- Rival: Trinity Christian School
- Accreditation: Southern Association of Colleges and Schools
- School fees: $1200-$1650 depending on grade level
- Tuition: Grades K5-6th=$8850; Grades 7th-12th= $9950
- Website: http://www.ucsjax.com

University Christian School is a private Christian school in Jacksonville, Florida, U.S. It is part of the ministry of the University Church, a local Baptist congregation. It serves students from pre-kindergarten through graduation. The school has a strong focus on sports and has won several state titles in various sports such as football, baseball and wrestling. The school was established as a segregation academy in order to keep white children away from minorities in response to court ordered desegregation of public schools.

== History ==
University Christian School is an extension of University Church. University Church was founded in 1950; Jack J. Dinsbeer became pastor of the small congregation in 1953. Under his leadership the church grew in membership, and in 1965 the church established a kindergarten. In 1970 University Christian School expanded into a full elementary school with grades one through six. The first class graduated in 1973, and a year later the administration acquired more land for additional buildings to house a middle and high school. The school continued to expand in the 1990s.

== Academics ==
In 2012, the school replaced textbooks with iPads.

== Notable alumni ==
- Otis Anderson Jr., American football player
- Glenn Davis, Former professional baseball player (Houston Astros, Baltimore Orioles)
- Storm Davis, Former professional baseball player (Baltimore Orioles, San Diego Padres, Oakland Athletics, Kansas City Royals, Detroit Tigers) and current Pitching Coach of the Daytona Cubs
- Ashley Greene, actress in the Twilight Saga
- Marquis Haynes, Outside Linebacker for the Carolina Panthers
- Kelly Kelly, WWE personality. Kelly Kelly, formerly known as Barbara Blank
- AC Leonard, CFL football player
