= Jake McDonough =

American football player (born 1989)

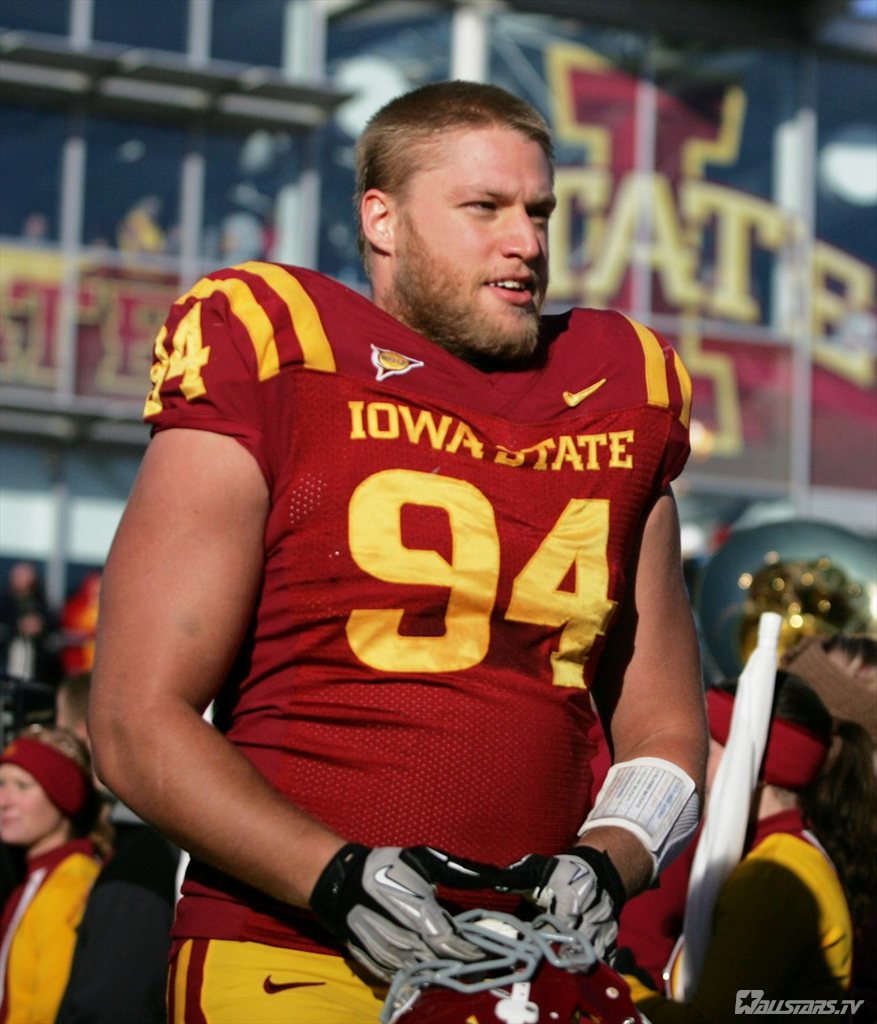
- McDonough at Iowa State in 2012

No. 9, 99
- Position: Defensive end

Personal information
- Born: November 3, 1989 (age 37); Urbandale, Iowa
- Listed height: 6 ft 5 in (1.96 m)
- Listed weight: 280 lb (127 kg)

Career information
- High school: West Des Moines (IA) Valley
- College: Iowa State
- NFL draft: 2013: undrafted

Career history
- New York Jets (2013)*; Portland Thunder (2013); Indianapolis Colts (2013)*; Portland Thunder (2014–2015); Washington Redskins (2014)*; Omaha Mammoths (2014)
- * Offseason or practice squad member only

Awards and highlights
- First-team All-Big 12 (2012)

Career AFL statistics
- Tackles: 14.0
- Sacks: 0.0
- Interceptions: 0
- Forced fumbles: 0
- Passes Broken Up: 5
- Stats at ArenaFan.com
- Stats at Pro Football Reference

Jake McDonough (born November 3, 1989) is an American former football player. He played college football at Iowa State University, and was signed as an undrafted free agent by the New York Jets in 2013. He was also a member of the Portland Thunder, Indianapolis Colts, Washington Redskins, and Omaha Mammoths.

== Early life ==
He attended Valley High School in West Des Moines, Iowa. He was selected to the 2006 second-team Des Moines Register Class 4A all-state as a defensive lineman. He was selected to the 2007 second-team 4A all-state at the defensive lineman position and also was selected to the 2007 first-team all-state by Iowa Newspaper Association. He was selected to the 2007 first-team all-conference team.

== College career ==
He played college football at Iowa State as a defensive lineman. Prior to his Senior season, he was selected Phil Steele's College Football Preview 2012 second-team All-Big 12 team. While at Iowa State, he finished with a total of 89 Tackles, 5 Sacks, 3 Forced fumbles and one Forced fumble. He was named Iowa State Defensive Lineman of the Year (2012), All-Big 12 First-team (Coaches - 2012), All-Big 12 Honorable Mention (Associated Press - 2012), and was the Big 12 Defensive Lineman of the Year Honorable Mention (Coaches - 2012)

== Professional career ==
=== New York Jets ===
On April 27, 2013, he signed with the New York Jets as an undrafted free agent. On July 25, 2013, the Jets waived McDonough with an injury settlement.

=== Portland Thunder ===
On October 30, 2013, McDonough was assigned to the Portland Thunder of the Arena Football League. In 2015, McDonough was awarded the Iron Man Award for most versatile player. He played both offensive and defensive line, while also contributing on special teams.

=== Indianapolis Colts ===
In December 2013, the Thunder placed McDonough on the other league exempt list when he was signed to the Indianapolis Colts practice squad.

He was waived by the Colts on February 18, 2014.

=== Washington Redskins ===
The Washington Redskins signed McDonough on July 30, 2014. He was waived on August 24.

== Personal life ==
McDonough later became a police officer for the Ankeny Iowa Police Department.
