= Eric Bassey =

American football player (born 1983)

No. 41
- Position: Safety

Personal information
- Born: January 23, 1983 (age 43); Garland, Texas, U.S.
- Listed height: 6 ft 1 in (1.85 m)
- Listed weight: 200 lb (91 kg)

Career information
- College: Oklahoma

Career history
- Buffalo Bills (2006–2007)*; St. Louis Rams (2007–2009)
- * Offseason or practice squad member only

Career statistics
- Total tackles: 21
- Fumble recoveries: 1
- Stats at Pro Football Reference

Eric O. Bassey (born January 23, 1983) is an American former professional football player who was a safety in the National Football League (NFL). He was signed by the Buffalo Bills as an undrafted free agent in 2006. He played college football for the Oklahoma Sooners.

== Early life ==
Bassey Attended North Garland High School in Garland, Texas, where he played wide receiver and defensive back in addition to returning kicks. He also excelled in track as a member of a 4×100-meter relay team that finished second in the state championship meet and he won state championship in 400-meter event.

== College career ==
Bassey played college football at the University of Oklahoma. He played in 48 games totaling 112 tackles, two sacks, three forced fumbles, one fumble recovery and three interceptions. Had a fumble recovery returned for a touchdown against Alabama in the season opener at OU Memorial Stadium, and in 2004 returned an interception for a touchdown against UCLA Bruins.

== Professional career ==
=== Buffalo Bills ===
Bassey was originally signed by the Buffalo Bills as an undrafted free agent in 2006 and spent the entire season on the practice squad.

=== St. Louis Rams ===
On September 12, 2007, he was signed by the St. Louis Rams to their practice squad and was then later signed to the active roster. During the 2007 season, he played in eight games recording 11 tackles.

Bassey spent the first seven weeks of the 2008 season on the Rams' practice squad. He was promoted to the active roster on October 22, 2008, after wide receiver Eddie Kennison was waived.

On August 9, 2009, Bassey was waived/injured after suffering a torn ACL in a special teams drill.

== Post-Retirement ==
Bassey is now the co-owner of the Texas Outlaws of the new Fall Experimental Football League along with fellow NFL alum Tommie Harris.
