= John Jenkins (American football coach) =

American gridiron football player and coach (born 1952)

Biographical details
- Born: June 21, 1952 (age 74); Pampa, Texas, U.S.

Playing career
- 1970–1973: Arkansas
- Positions: Quarterback, running back

Coaching career (HC unless noted)
- 1977–1978: Arkansas (DB)
- 1979–1983: Mississippi State (LB)
- 1984: Houston Gamblers (ST)
- 1985: Houston Gamblers (OC)
- 1986: Pittsburgh (QB)
- 1987–1989: Houston (OC)
- 1990–1992: Houston
- 1994: Winnipeg Blue Bombers (DB)
- 1995: Birmingham Barracudas (OC)
- 1996: Hamilton Tiger-Cats (OC)
- 1997–1998: Toronto Argonauts (OC)
- 1999: Milwaukee Mustangs (AHC/OC)
- 2001: Toronto Argonauts (OC)
- 2004: Calgary Stampeders (OC)
- 2006: Ottawa Renegades
- 2014: FXFL Blacktips
- 2015: Hudson Valley Fort

Head coaching record
- Overall: 18–15 (college)

John Jenkins (born June 20, 1952) is an American football coach and former player. He served as the head football coach the University of Houston from 1990 to 1992, compiling a record of 18–15. A proponent of the run and shoot offense, Jenkins also coached professional football in the United States Football League (USFL), the Canadian Football League (CFL) and the Fall Experimental Football League (FXFL). He served as the head coach of the CFL's Ottawa Renegades in 2006, the FXFL's Blacktips in 2014 and the Hudson Valley Fort for part of 2015. During his career as a coach, Jenkins has mentored a number of notable quarterbacks such as Andre Ware, David Klingler, Jim Kelly, Eric Crouch, Kliff Kingsbury, Anthony Calvillo and Doug Flutie.

== Early life and playing career ==
Jenkins was raised in Pampa, Texas. He played college football at the University of Arkansas.

== Coaching career ==
=== Houston Gamblers ===
After serving as the special teams coach for the Houston Gamblers of the USFL in 1984, Jenkins was promoted to offensive coordinator in 1985 with the departure of Mouse Davis, who moved to the Denver Gold as head coach. Jenkins kept the run and shoot offense that Davis had installed, but modified the offense into his own version. In Jenkins' debut as offensive coordinator against Steve Young and the Los Angeles Express, the Gamblers trailed 33–13 with eight minutes left in the fourth quarter. Employing a hurry-up offense, the Gamblers came back to win the game 34–33. Since the game was not televised, Sports Illustrated dubbed it "The Greatest Game Never Seen".

In the fourth week of the 1985 season, the Gamblers met Davis' Denver Gold in the first game ever to pit two run and shoot offenses. The two offenses showed only small similarities as Jenkins employed various new tactics such as motioning receivers out of the backfield and going into empty sets. The Gamblers won 36–17.

After the game, quarterback Jim Kelly was on pace to finish the season with 7,434 yards and 78 touchdowns. But due to a leg injury, he missed six games of the regular season and he fell well short of those marks. However, Kelly and his backup, Todd Dillon, combined 6,118 yards passing on the season, a record for professional American football. The Gamblers offense also featured three receivers—Clarence Verdin, Gerald McNeil, and Richard Johnson—that each totaled over 1,000 yards, a rarity that only Don Coryell's San Diego Chargers accomplished in the early 1980s. The Gamblers made the playoffs with a 10–8 record, and lost to the Birmingham Stallions, 22–20.

==== Dream Team ====
In 1986, Donald Trump, owner of the New Jersey Generals, bought the Houston Gamblers. The Gamblers and the Generals were merged, matching the USFL's leading rusher, Herschel Walker, with its leading passer, Kelly, and creating what ESPN called the "Dream Team". There were also rumors of Jenkins installing a two-quarterback system with Doug Flutie in the slot. However, after a failed attempt to launch the season in the fall, the USFL folded, and the "Dream Team" never took the field.

=== Houston Cougars ===
==== Offensive coordinator ====
Jenkins moved to the University of Houston and joined the Houston Cougars football staff as the offensive coordinator in 1987. There he inherited a veer option offense featuring Andre Ware, who only threw one touchdown pass his entire high school career, and converted it into one of the most prolific passing attacks in college football history.

When Jenkins joined the Cougars, he had further developed his offense from a pure run and shoot attack into what he referred to as the "Multiple Adjusting Passing Offense" or "MAPO". Jenkins' new offense made an immediate impact in the Southwest Conference as Houston beat the Texas Longhorns handily in each of his first three seasons: 60–40 in 1987, 66–15 in 1988, and 47–9 in 1989. In 1988, Jason Phillips and James Dixon became the first two college football receivers to finish a season with over 100 catches. In 1989, Houston scored over 40 points in nine of their 11 games, including a 95–21 rout of SMU in which they racked up 1,021 yards of offense. Ware finished the season with 4,699 yards and 44 touchdowns, set 26 NCAA records, and won the Heisman Trophy. The 1989 Houston offense averaged 624.9 total yards per game and 10.1 yards rushing per carry, both national records.

==== Head coach ====
In 1990, Cougars head coach Jack Pardee left the team to take the head coaching position with the National Football League's Houston Oilers. Jenkins was promoted to head coach of the Cougars. With Ware gone, David Klingler took over at quarterback and continued the success of Jenkins' passing attack. Klingler threw for over 400 yards in nine of 11 games in 1990, including a 716-yard performance against Arizona State in the Coca-Cola Classic. He averaged 474.6 yards a game, a national record. Klingler also broke the national record for most touchdown passes in a game with 11 against Eastern Washington. He completed the season with 5,140 yards and 54 touchdowns, outpacing Ware's totals from 1989, but fell short in the Heisman race, finishing fifth behind winner Ty Detmer and three others. Houston finished the season 10–1. Their only loss came against Texas. The Cougars were not allowed to go to a bowl game due to NCAA sanctions for violations under former coach Bill Yeoman. Jenkins' teams featured the nation's leading receiver each year from 1987 to 1992.

The Cougars started the 1991 season poised to pick up right where they left off. After routing Louisiana Tech 73–3 in the first game of the season, the next game was a nationally televised road game against the Miami Hurricanes. They lost 40–10. Houston won only seven more games during the remainder of Jenkins' tenure. He resigned under fire in the spring of 1993.

=== Canadian Football League ===
After leaving Houston, Jenkins landed a job as a defensive backs coach with the Winnipeg Blue Bombers of the Canadian Football League (CFL). Jenkins coached with a number of CFL teams before joining the Toronto Argonauts as the offensive coordinator. There Jenkins installed a new offense built around the strengths of quarterback, Doug Flutie. The Argonauts won the Grey Cup in 1997.

=== FXFL ===
Jenkins was appointed as head coach for the Fall Experimental Football League's Blacktips for the 2014 season. In 2015, he became the head coach of the Hudson Valley Fort. He quit that position midway through the season, citing payment and player safety problems.

=== FCF ===
In 2021, Jenkins signed as a coach with Fan Controlled Football.

== Head coaching record ==
=== College ===
Year	Team	Overall	Conference	Standing	Bowl/playoffs	AP^{#}
Houston Cougars (Southwest Conference) (1990–1992)
1990	Houston	10–1	7–1	2nd		10
1991	Houston	4–7	3–5	7th		
1992	Houston	4–7	2–5	7th		
Houston:		18–15	12–11			
Total:		18–15				
