= Lawrence Academy (Falmouth, Massachusetts) =

- U.S. National Register of Historic Places
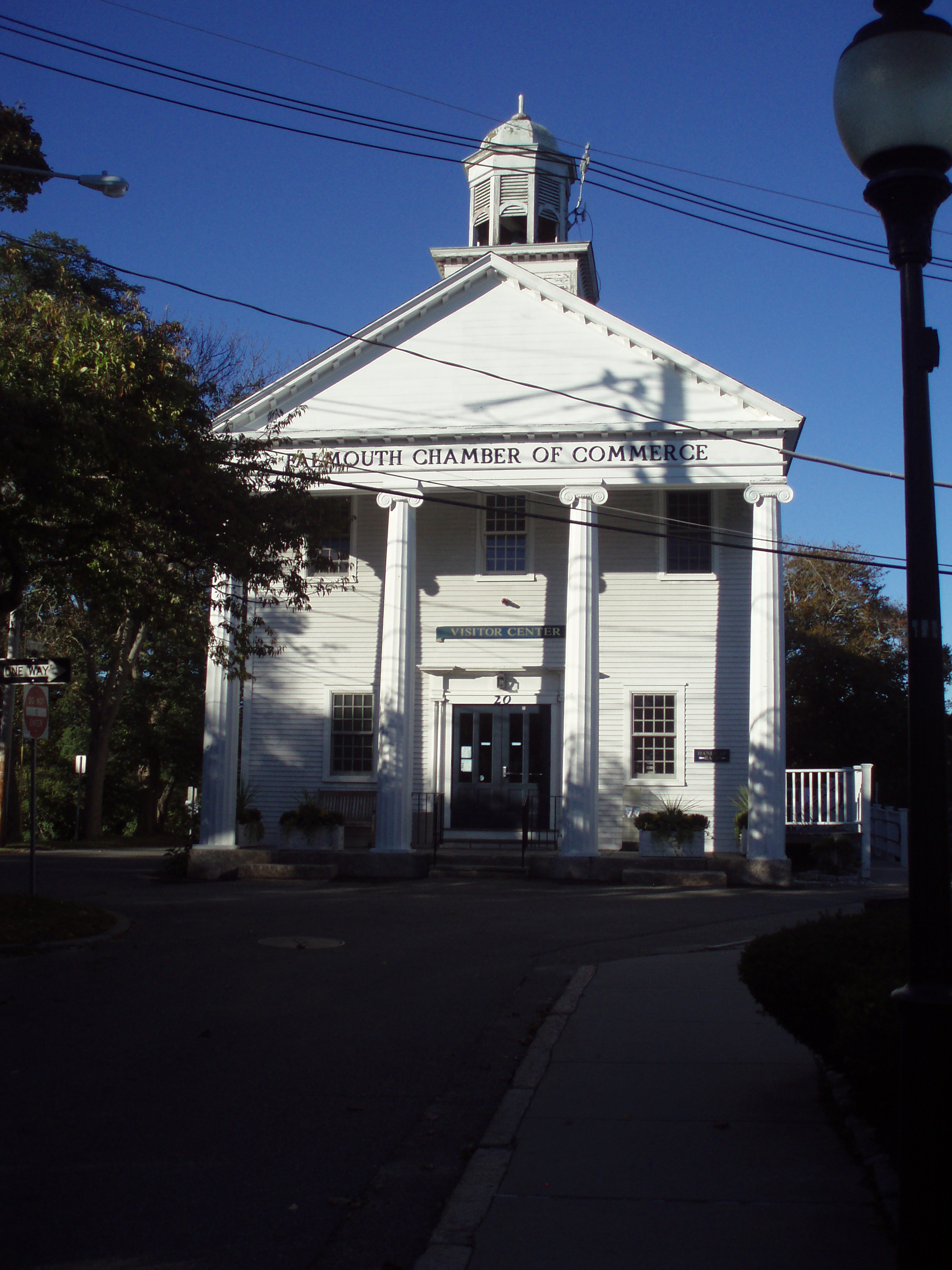
- Lawrence Academy

- Location within Cape Cod Location within Massachusetts Location within the United States
- Location: Falmouth, Massachusetts
- Coordinates: 41°33′9″N 70°36′57″W
- Built: 1834
- Architectural style: Greek Revival
- NRHP reference No.: 98000123
- Added to NRHP: February 20, 1998

The Lawrence Academy is a historic former school building at 20 Academy Lane in Falmouth, Massachusetts. Built in 1834, it is one of Falmouth's finest Greek Revival buildings. At first operated as a private academy, it served as Falmouth's high school from 1891 to 1895, and then as civic hall for a variety of veterans organizations. The building currently houses the Falmouth Chamber of Commerce. The building was listed on the National Register of Historic Places in 1998.

== Description and history ==
Lawrence Academy is set facing south at the end of Academy Lane, a short street off Main Street (Massachusetts Route 28) in Falmouth's central business district. It is a 2 1/2-story wood-frame structure, with a front-gable roof, Greek temple portico facade and a two-stage bell tower. The portico consists of an entablature and gabled pediment supported by four Ionic columns. The pediment is flushboarded, with modillioned cornice and eaves. The bell tower has a square clapboarded first stage with a modillioned cornice, and an octagonal belfry as the second stage. It is a reconstruction of the original tower based on historic photographs.

Lawrence Academy was built in 1834, following a regional trend for the establishment of private academies. The school incorporated in 1835. Beginning in the 1870s, changes in state regulations required towns to provide secondary education. Pursuant to this goal, the town acquired the academy building in 1890, and used it as its high school until a new building was completed in 1896. The town leased the hall to the local chapter of the Grand Army of the Republic, a Civil War veterans organization, and it was later used by Sons of Union Veterans and the American Legion. A sympathetic addition lengthening the building was made in the 1940s, and the bell tower was rebuilt in the 1960s and repaired in the 1990s after it was damaged by Hurricane Bob. It is currently home to the local chamber of commerce.

== See also ==
- National Register of Historic Places listings in Barnstable County, Massachusetts
