= Texas Outlaws (football) =

Proposed professional football team based in Austin, Texas

General information
- Founded: 2014
- Headquartered: Austin, Texas, United States
- Colors: Black, platinum, White
- Website: www.fxfl.com

Personnel
- Owners: Tommie Harris, Eric Bassey

Team history
- Texas Outlaws (2014–2015)

League / conference affiliations
- Fall Experimental Football League

The Texas Outlaws were a proposed professional football team based in Austin, Texas. They were to be members of Fall Experimental Football League. The team was owned by former NFL players Tommie Harris and Eric Bassey. They announced that the team colors were to be platinum and black, but had yet to announce a home stadium. They shared the mascot name with another team in Austin, the Austin Outlaws of the Women's Football Alliance.

The Outlaws did not play in FXFL's inaugural 2014 season. As of the end of the 2014 season, the team was still being considered as a possibility for 2015, however, they were not included in that season's schedule and were assumed to have folded. The FXFL itself also ceased operations during the 2015 season.

Former FXFL CEO Brian Woods brought minor league football to Austin in 2018 when he held that year's edition of The Spring League, another development league he founded, to the city.
