= Omaha Mammoths =

Professional football team based in Omaha, Nebraska

- Founded: 2014
- Folded: 2014
- League: Fall Experimental Football League (2014)
- Team history: Omaha Mammoths (2014)
- Based in: Omaha, Nebraska
- Stadium: TD Ameritrade Park Omaha
- Colors: Navy Blue, Orange, Gray, White
- Head coach: Sandy Buda
- General manager: Donnie Woods
- Championships: 0
- Conference titles: 0
- Playoff berths: 0

The Omaha Mammoths were a professional football team based in Omaha, Nebraska. They were a charter member of the Fall Experimental Football League, which was trying to become the developmental league for the National Football League. They played their home games at TD Ameritrade Park in Omaha, home of the College World Series and the former home of the United Football League's Omaha Nighthawks. The Mammoths were the first pro outdoor football franchise to play in Omaha since the Nighthawks.

Despite having the strongest attendance in the FXFL for 2014 and a promise from the commissioner that the team would return, the Mammoths were quietly replaced by the Hudson Valley Fort during the 2015 offseason due to travel costs. Mammoths coach Sandy Buda confirmed the report on July 19. The Mammoths finished their first and only season in second place with a record of 3–1, declining to play a championship game.

== Schedule ==
=== Regular season ===
Week	Date	Opponent	Result	Record	Venue
1	October 8	Boston Brawlers	W 41–18	1–0	TD Ameritrade Park Omaha
2	October 15	Florida Blacktips	W 20–19	2–0	TD Ameritrade Park Omaha
3	October 24	at Brooklyn Bolts	L 13–15	2–1	MCU Park
4	November 5	Boston Brawlers	W 10–8	3–1	TD Ameritrade Park Omaha
5	~~November 12~~	~~Brooklyn Bolts~~			~~TD Ameritrade Park Omaha~~
6	~~November 26~~	~~at Brooklyn Bolts (championship)~~			~~MCU Park~~

== Final roster ==
Omaha Mammoths final roster
Quarterbacks: 10 Jordan Jefferson; 4 Brock Jensen; Running backs: 35 Timothy Flanders; 24 John Griffin; 28 LaDarius Perkins; Wide receivers: 19 Gerald Ford; 17 Greg Hardin; 12 Tramain Thompson; 11 Derel Walker; Tight ends: 84 Ernest Brun; 87 Matt Thayer	Offensive linemen: 77 Kyle Bryant; 79 Jack Breckner; 74 Stetson Burnett; 76 Bronson Irwin; 75 Ryan McGrath; 70 Elliott Mealer; 71 John Sullen; Defensive linemen: 98 Travis Chappelear; 94 Lanier Coleman; 92 Jake McDonough; 93 Louis Nzegwu; 90 Daniel Riley; 99 Craig Roh; 72 Fatu Ulale	Linebackers: 53 JoJo Dickson; 52 Nate Dreiling; 55 Adrian Hamilton; 56 Alonzo Highsmith Jr.; Defensive backs: 31 Jarrid Bryant CB; 27 Qua Cox CB; 21 Javon Harris S; 31 Tysyn Hartman S; 32 Julian Lewis; 22 Keith Lewis; 32 Jericho Nelson; Special teams: 15 Trey Barrow P/K; -- Marcus Heit LS	Reserve lists: Currently vacant; Practice squad: Currently vacant; Rookies in italics Roster updated October 27, 2014; 40 Active, 0 Inactive
