= 2014 FXFL season =

- League: Fall Experimental Football League
- Sport: Gridiron football
- Duration: October 8 – November 7, 2014

Regular season
- Season champions: Brooklyn Bolts

Seasons
- 2015 →

The 2014 FXFL season was the inaugural season of the Fall Experimental Football League (FXFL).

Four teams participated in the 2014 season: the Boston Brawlers, Brooklyn Bolts, Omaha Mammoths, and the traveling Blacktips. A fifth team, the Texas Outlaws, suspended operations before the start of the 2014 season and never played.

== Full schedule ==
Date	Visitor	Score	Home	Score	Attendance
Wednesday, October 8	Boston	18	Omaha	41	est. 3,000
Wednesday, October 15	Blacktips	19	Omaha	20	est. 1,500
Wednesday, October 15	Boston	20	Brooklyn	27	1,940
Friday, October 24	Blacktips	10	Boston	28	945
Friday, October 24	Omaha	13	Brooklyn	15	
Friday, October 31	Brooklyn	23	Boston	16	
Wednesday, November 5	Boston	8	Omaha	10	est. 4,000
Friday, November 7	Blacktips	13	Brooklyn	26	
Wednesday, November 12	~~Brooklyn at Omaha, 8 p.m~~ (Canceled)				
Wednesday, November 26	~~Omaha at Brooklyn (championship)~~ (Canceled)				

== Final standings ==
Team	Wins	Losses	Win pct.	PF	PA	Net points	Home	Road	Streak
Brooklyn	4	0	1.000	91	62	29	3–0	1–0	W4
Omaha	3	1	.750	84	60	24	3–0	0–1	W1
Boston	1	4	.200	90	111	-21	1–1	0–3	L2
Blacktips	0	3	.000	42	74	-32	0–0	0–3	L3
