= Boston Brawlers =

- Founded: 2014
- Folded: 2015
- League: Fall Experimental Football League (2014–2015)
- Team history: Boston Brawlers (2014); Mahoning Valley Brawlers (2015)
- Based in: Boston, Massachusetts
- Arena: Harvard Stadium
- Colors: Midnight Blue, Red, White
- Owner: Fall Experimental Football League
- Head coach: Terry Shea
- General manager: Cory Bachman
- Championships: 0
- Conference titles: 0
- Playoff berths: 0

The Boston Brawlers were a professional American football team based in Boston, Massachusetts. The team was based at Harvard Stadium in Boston as the Boston Brawlers, and were a charter member of the Fall Experimental Football League (FXFL), which tried to become the developmental league for the National Football League. Their primary colors were red, midnight blue and white, similar to Major League Baseball's Boston Red Sox, and its logo featured a mustachioed, bare-fisted boxer.

The team never found an owner willing to keep the team in Boston. The league confirmed it would not return to Boston for the 2015 season, reassigned coach Terry Shea and general manager Cory Bachman to the Brooklyn Bolts, and relocated the franchise to Niles, Ohio, where the team was to be called the Mahoning Valley Brawlers, as the city is well known for boxing. The Brawlers would have been the first outdoor professional football team to call the Mahoning Valley home since the Youngstown Patricians, a prominent team in the Ohio League of the 1910s. The team had hired Montreal Alouettes offensive coordinator Rick Worman to be head coach for the 2015 season. However, on September 28, 2015, a week before the first scheduled game, the FXFL informed the Brawlers' franchisee (the Mahoning Valley Scrappers baseball team) that the Brawlers would not be taking part in the 2015 season. The Scrappers indicated, while not revealing any details, that the league did not have enough money to operate four teams for the 2015 season.

== Results ==
=== 2014 season ===
Date	Opponent	Home/Away	Result	Score	Attendance
October 8	Omaha Mammoths	Away	L	18-41	3,000
October 15	Brooklyn Bolts	Away	L	20-27	1,940
October 24	Florida Blacktips	Home	W	28-10	945
October 31	Brooklyn Bolts	Home	L	16-23	-
November 5	Omaha Mammoths	Away	L	8-10	4,000

== Final roster ==
2014 Boston Brawlers roster
Quarterbacks (QB): 2 Carson Coffman; Running backs (RB): 20 Martin Hyppollite; 21 Emmanuel Moody; 13 Wynel Seldon; Wide receivers (WR): 11 Jasper Collins; 17 Vidal Hazelton; 7 Jake Jones; 18 Julian Horton; 16 Corbin Louks; 19 Wilson Van Hooser; 15 Isaiah Vogeli; Tight ends (TE): 88 Brandon Ford; 82 Cam White FB	Offensive linemen (OL): 55 Matt Armstrong C; 64 Will Latu; 69 Tori Mobley; 66 R.J. Mattes; 68 David Mims; 65 Randy Richards; Defensive linemen (DL): 90 Junior Aumavae; 92 Darryl Cato-Bishop DE; 99 John Drew; 75 Ross Earl; 93 Johnnie Farms	Linebackers (LB): 57 Quandon Christian; 56 Ronnell Lewis; 53 Chris McAllister; 91 Greg Romeus; 54 Phillip Steward; 52 Garrett Waggoner; 50 Jonathan Willard; Defensive backs (DB): 33 Ashton Cobb; 35 Avery Cunningham; 27 Shamiel Gary; 30 Cannon Smith; 29 Hakeem Smith; 37 Ryan White; 22 Trey Wolfe; Special teams (ST): 1 Morgan Lineberry K; 41 Avery Rigg LS	Practice squad: Currently vacant; Reserve: Currently vacant; Rookies in italics 40 active, 0 reserve, 0 practice squad
