= Brooklyn Bolts =

Professional American football team

- Founded: 2014
- Folded: 2016
- League: Fall Experimental Football League (FXFL) (2014–2016)
- Team history: Brooklyn Bolts (2014–2016)
- Based in: Brooklyn, New York City, New York
- Stadium: MCU Park
- Colors: Black, Yellow, Grey
- Owner: FXFL (Owned); Brooklyn Cyclones (Operated)
- Head coach: Terry Shea
- Championships: 2 (2014, 2015)
- Conference titles: 0
- Playoff berths: 0

The Brooklyn Bolts were a professional American football team based in Brooklyn, New York City, New York. They were a charter member of the Fall Experimental Football League (FXFL), which was trying to become the developmental league for the National Football League. They played their home games at MCU Park.

== History ==
In August 2014, it was announced that Brooklyn was awarded a franchise for the upcoming 2014 season of the Fall Experimental Football League (FXFL).

All of the teams in the league are owned by the FXFL, but local Minor League Baseball franchises are responsible for the operations of each team. The Bolts worked in conjunction with the Brooklyn Cyclones who play at MCU Park on Coney Island. By playing its games in Brooklyn, the Bolts became the first outdoor professional football team to play in New York City proper since 1983, when the New York Jets left Shea Stadium. (Two short-lived arena football teams, the Knights in 1988 and the CityHawks in 1997 and 1998, also played in the city; otherwise, all professional teams claiming to represent the city have played in either New Jersey or Long Island.)

On July 10, 2015, the league confirmed the Bolts would return for the 2015 season. Former NFL quarterback Josh Freeman played for the Bolts for the 2015 season and then signed with the Indianapolis Colts and started the Colts' final regular season game of 2015.

In early August 2016, Brooklyn Baseball Banter, a site that covers the Brooklyn Cyclones, reported that the Cyclones' front office was about to pull the plug on the Bolts and the FXFL at MCU Park, as the league had not contacted the Cyclones regarding a third season (the Cyclones were prepared to bring back the Bolts if the league was prepared to play). A few weeks later the site reported that Cyclones' management had stated that the league had canceled the 2016 season and that the Bolts had folded and put remaining fan merchandise on discount clearance. In the spring of 2017, former FXFL commissioner Brain Woods re-emerged as CEO of a new circuit called The Spring League; its business model was different from the FXFL's, as the teams no longer have set home cities or distinctive identities.

In December 2016, Woods was reported to be considering bringing the Bolts or Blacktips back to play in an indoor league and is eyeing the Arena Football League, National Arena League, Champions Indoor Football and Indoor Football League.

== Coaches ==
For the 2014 season, veteran NFL player John Bock was named as head coach of Bolts. Joining Bock on the Brooklyn Bolts staff were former NFL players Marvin Jones, James Brown, Nate Poole, Deon Dyer, Kelvin Kinney and defensive coordinator Joey Smith. Former NFL head coach and defensive coordinator Rod Rust served as a consultant to the Bolts. Also serving as coaching consultants were Don Strock, Danny Hope and Fred O’ Connor. Offensive coordinator Wayne Anderson Jr. is the former assistant head coach of the SoCal Coyotes, a developmental team located near Palm Springs, California.

For the 2015 season, Terry Shea, who had spent the previous season as head coach of the Boston Brawlers, was installed as head coach.
