= Fall Experimental Football League =

Professional football minor league

- Sport: American football
- Founded: May 7, 2014
- First season: 2014
- Folded: 2016
- CEO: Brian Woods
- No. of teams: 3
- Country: United States
- Last champion: Brooklyn Bolts
- Broadcasters: ESPN3; Regional channels
- Related competitions: Direct: USFL, XFL, UFL, TSL; Affiliated: IFL; Other: NFL, CFL, AAF
- Website: gofxfl.com

The Fall Experimental Football League (FXFL) was a professional football minor league that played two seasons in 2014 and 2015. This league's stated goal was to become a professional feeder-system for the National Football League (NFL).

The league claimed 44 out of 126 players ended up on NFL rosters. After the FXFL ceased operations, FXFL founder and CEO Brian Woods made another attempt at an NFL feeder-system by creating The Spring League in 2017.

Woods and the FXFL were subject to lawsuit after folding, claiming he did not pay players, assistant coaches, cheerleaders and officials. In 2019 Woods settled and agreed to pay the plaintiffs $300,000.

== History ==
In the summer of 2013, Brian Woods began work on a business plan for a future football development league. With NFL executive vice president Troy Vincent indicating in an April 2014 interview a need for a developmental football league, Woods, a sports lawyer and executive director of the Medal of Honor Bowl, put that business plan in action to launch such a league in October 2014 that envisioned six franchises primarily based in minor league baseball stadiums. The Fall Experimental Football League was announced by Woods on May 7, 2014. Original targeted markets for teams were New York City, Boston, Omaha, Orlando, Portland, and either San Antonio or Memphis, Tennessee with Wednesday games. The league is expected to own two teams outright and four franchised teams. By June 20, Tommie Harris and Eric Bassey were announced as the first owners for a franchise in Austin, Texas, the Texas Outlaws, with other teams announced without ownership were New York, Boston, Omaha, Portland, Oregon and an unselected Florida city.

On August 20, 2014, Woods announced that the league would consist of just four teams — Brooklyn, Boston, Omaha and Miami — with players released from NFL teams to allocated and reporting on September 24 with games to start October 8. Cities in which interest in franchises came from Columbus, Ohio, and Springfield, Missouri. The Miami team became a traveling team.

The FXFL debuted on time with the inaugural game in Omaha on October 8, 2014 between the Omaha Mammoths and the Boston Brawlers at TD Ameritrade Park with the Mammoths winning 41–18. By Week 3 of the 2014 season, Nivea had become a sponsor of the league, with sponsor logo on the left shoulder and helmets; additionally, a reality web show on the FXFL appeared, sponsored by Nivea.

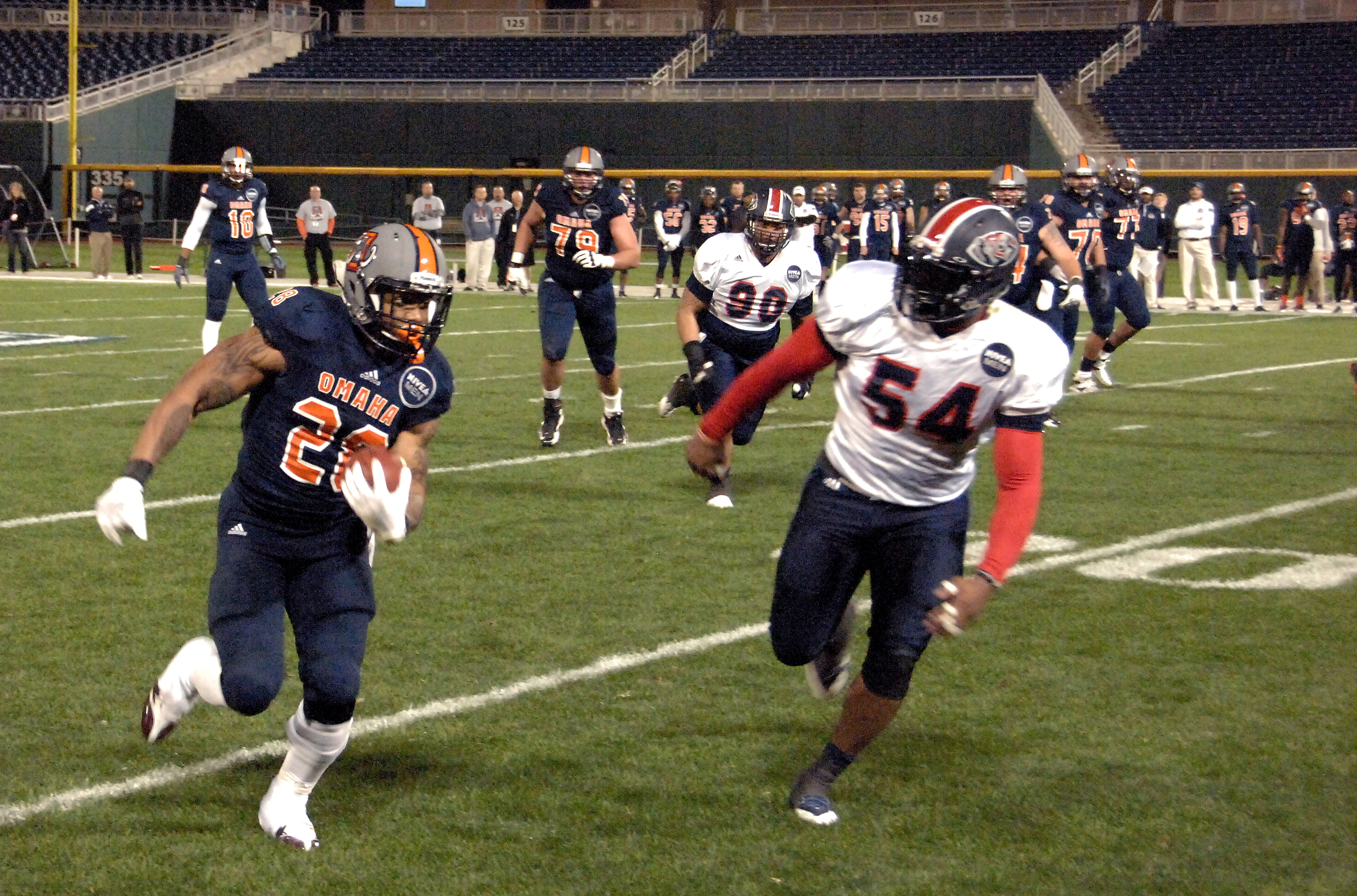
A game between the Omaha Mammoths and Boston Brawlers at TD Ameritrade Park Omaha on November 5, 2014

The inaugural 2014 season was cut short after the November 7 contest, with one regular season game and a championship left unplayed. The decision was made that the Bolts, the team with the best record at 4–0, would be declared the first FXFL Champions, according to ESPN3. In a report from the Associated Press, commissioner Brian Woods said that he was satisfied with the season and said he envisioned a bigger FXFL in 2015, with more affiliations with minor league baseball teams and stadia, targeting such cities as Memphis, Austin, Oklahoma City and somewhere in Florida. Woods also expected Brooklyn and Omaha to return. Woods later backed off plans for expansion and said that 2015 would most likely only have five teams at most.

WYTV in Niles, Ohio reported on July 10, 2015 that the league was expected to place a franchise in that city for the 2015 season. The announcement also confirmed that the Brooklyn Bolts would return, the league would remain fixed at four teams for the 2015 season, and three out of four of the teams would be sharing a stadium with a New York–Penn League baseball team (this included the Bolts and the Ohio franchise). A later leak reported in the local newspaper The Vindicator that the Omaha Mammoths would not return for 2015 and would be replaced by a team in the Hudson Valley, but that the Florida Blacktips would make a second attempt at establishing themselves in Florida. The league unexpectedly contracted the Brawlers on September 28, 2015, with the team's franchisee stating that the league demanded a large sum of money in order for the team to take the field for the 2015 season. The 2015 season also ended prematurely, with the league office canceling the last regular season game days before it was scheduled to be played.

Since the abrupt end of the 2015 season in October, there were no official statements made by the league (whether the Bolts could claim a championship given the extremely irregular schedule was left undecided) and the last posts on social media were made in December 2015. There was already doubt regarding the Hudson Valley team's future, as the stadium owner had only offered a one-year trial lease to the team, and their lone season was marred by safety concerns and defections. The Brooklyn Bolts were the last holdout, waiting through summer 2016 for word from the league whether or not it would return, before the team's parent company announced in August that neither the league nor the Bolts would return for the fall season.

The league announced a suspension of operations on September 2, 2016. Commissioner Brian Woods has reportedly expressed interest possibly using a former FXFL team's brand in an indoor football league, such as the Arena Football League. A team in the National Arena League acquired the rights to the Boston Brawlers name in August 2017.

In 2017, Woods re-emerged as CEO of another minor professional football league, The Spring League, which operated on a similar concept but did not pay its players and operated its seasons all in one location. After five seasons of play, TSL ceased operations as Woods assumed the presidency of a reboot of the United States Football League.

== Rule differences ==
As its name implies, the league adopted several experimental rule changes differing from those at other levels of the game with some at the request of the NFL. Initial plans for the league had punting, the PAT and kickoffs taken out of the game, but this proposal was scrapped prior to the start of the season.

- Extra points were attempted from 35 yards out. Both the NFL and Canadian Football League later adopted similar rules in 2015.
- All kicks originated at a wide hash mark for a greater difficulty.
- Kickoffs were taken from the kicking team's 25-yard line, in order to decrease touchbacks and "increase coverage opportunities". In addition, eight players on the receiving team lined up between the kicking team's 35- and 45-yard lines for the possibility of decreasing "high-impact collisions". Once a kickoff passes the 45 yard line, fielding rules became similar to punts in that the kicking team is not allowed to recover and regain possession.
- Games were originally played on Wednesday nights to avoid competition with high school football (Friday and Saturday), college football (Tuesday, Thursday, Friday and Saturday) and the NFL (Thursday, Sunday and Monday); the league also played some Friday night games later in the season. The league abandoned this approach in 2015 and scheduled most of its games for Fridays and Saturdays.
- Cut blocking was illegal.
- All players on a team's roster played in each game whenever possible.

== Business plan ==
Woods was quoted as saying about the new league: "Our long-term goal is to establish a partnership with the NFL and we feel can do that on many platforms. It would give them a way to work with younger players that they don't currently have. We can help them train prospective NFL officials—in the NBA, every referee entering the league (in recent years) comes from NBA Development League. We can be a testing ground for proposed rules, too." The league has an agreement with the NFL to use officials from the elder league's training academy for FXFL games. Had the FXFL succeeded in establishing a formal partnership with the NFL, it would have been the fifth such time the NFL has established a partnership with a minor league, following the Association of Professional Football Leagues of the 1940s, the Atlantic Coast Football League in the 1960s, NFL Europe of the 1990s and 2000s, and the NFL-owned teams in the Arena Football League (prior to 2008).

=== Rosters ===
Each FXFL team employed 40 players on their roster with a base salary of $1000 per game and a maximum potential payout of $1250 per game. (At least one team was paying as little as $300 per game in the 2015 season.) The league mainly recruited those who were released from NFL training camps in August and not assigned to practice squads with the players being pooled then allocated to the teams and transferable at the league's discretion. Those that could not go or would not go to college were also considered, but the league did not actively recruit NCAA players. The league also did not pursue experienced professional players and intended not to allow any player to play more than three years in the league (the league only lasted two years, rendering this rule moot); one anecdote had the league turning down Maurice Jones-Drew on account of his career being near its end (the anecdote may not be true, since Jones-Drew was already signed to a three-year deal with the Oakland Raiders before the league was founded). The league softened its stance on this stipulation for 2015; Josh Freeman, who spent four years as starting quarterback for the Tampa Bay Buccaneers, was signed to the Brooklyn Bolts for that year. Each team also had territorial rights to players, so any player in a team's territory was first choice is to that team. The league and team owners originally planned to arrange host families for the players, similar to other minor leagues; players instead were housed in hotels.

=== Finances ===
The league operated under a budget of $8 to $9 million for the first season and expected to be able to be viable with minor or development team attendance of 3,000 plus. The league reported receiving enough financing to operate for the first season. The FXFL sold game film to NFL teams as an additional source of revenue. In the long term, the FXFL did not expect to be profitable without official NFL support, which it never received. The league operated at a financial loss in the 2014 season, and Woods is said to have invested almost all of his personal wealth into the league by the end of the 2015 season.

A franchise cost was set at $500,000. The Brooklyn Bolts was a joint venture between the league and Jeff Wilpon, owner of the New York Mets and Brooklyn Cyclones. The Blacktips and Omaha Mammoths were league owned and operated. The Brawlers were initially reported as being independently owned but no owner was ever identified and the league later admitted that that was not true. For 2015, the franchise was to be operated by the Mahoning Valley Scrappers minor league baseball team. The Hudson Valley franchise was to be held by the Hudson Valley Renegades.

== Broadcasting ==
The league syndicated its games to a collection of 14 regional channels, digital subchannel networks, and broadcast stations, including SportsNet New York, New England Sports Network (both its main and national feeds), Cox Sports (New Orleans), Cox San Diego, Altitude, Tuff TV, Soul of the South Network, Untamed TV, and Chicago's The U Too. In addition, ESPN3 held online streaming media rights. The broadcast deals provided no guaranteed revenue to the league but did offer a share of advertising; it is not known if the league paid for production expenses or airtime as the UFL had to do.

Telecasts of FXFL games abruptly stopped midway through the 2015 season with the last two games on the schedule completely blacked out.

== Teams ==
Team	City	Stadium (capacity)	Years played
Brooklyn Bolts	Brooklyn, NYC, New York	MCU Park (10,000)	2014–15
Florida Blacktips	N/A	Traveling team	2014–15
Hudson Valley Fort	Fishkill, New York	Dutchess Stadium (4,500)	2015
Boston Brawlers	Boston, Massachusetts	Harvard Stadium (30,323)	2014
Omaha Mammoths	Omaha, Nebraska	TD Ameritrade Park Omaha (24,000)	2014

=== Announced teams that never played ===
- Unnamed Portland, Oregon team
- Texas Outlaws (Austin, Texas)
- Mahoning Valley Brawlers (Niles, Ohio) – a relocated Boston Brawlers team prior to the 2015 season.

== Seasons ==
Season	Teams	Games	First place	Record	Second place	Record
2014	4	8	Brooklyn Bolts	4–0	Omaha Mammoths	3–1
2015	3	5	Brooklyn Bolts	4–1	FXFL Blacktips	1–1

* – For the 2014 season, for which a championship game had been scheduled but canceled, the Bolts were awarded the league title based on regular season record. No championship was awarded for the 2015 season.
