= Westminster University (Utah) =

Private university in Salt Lake City, Utah, US

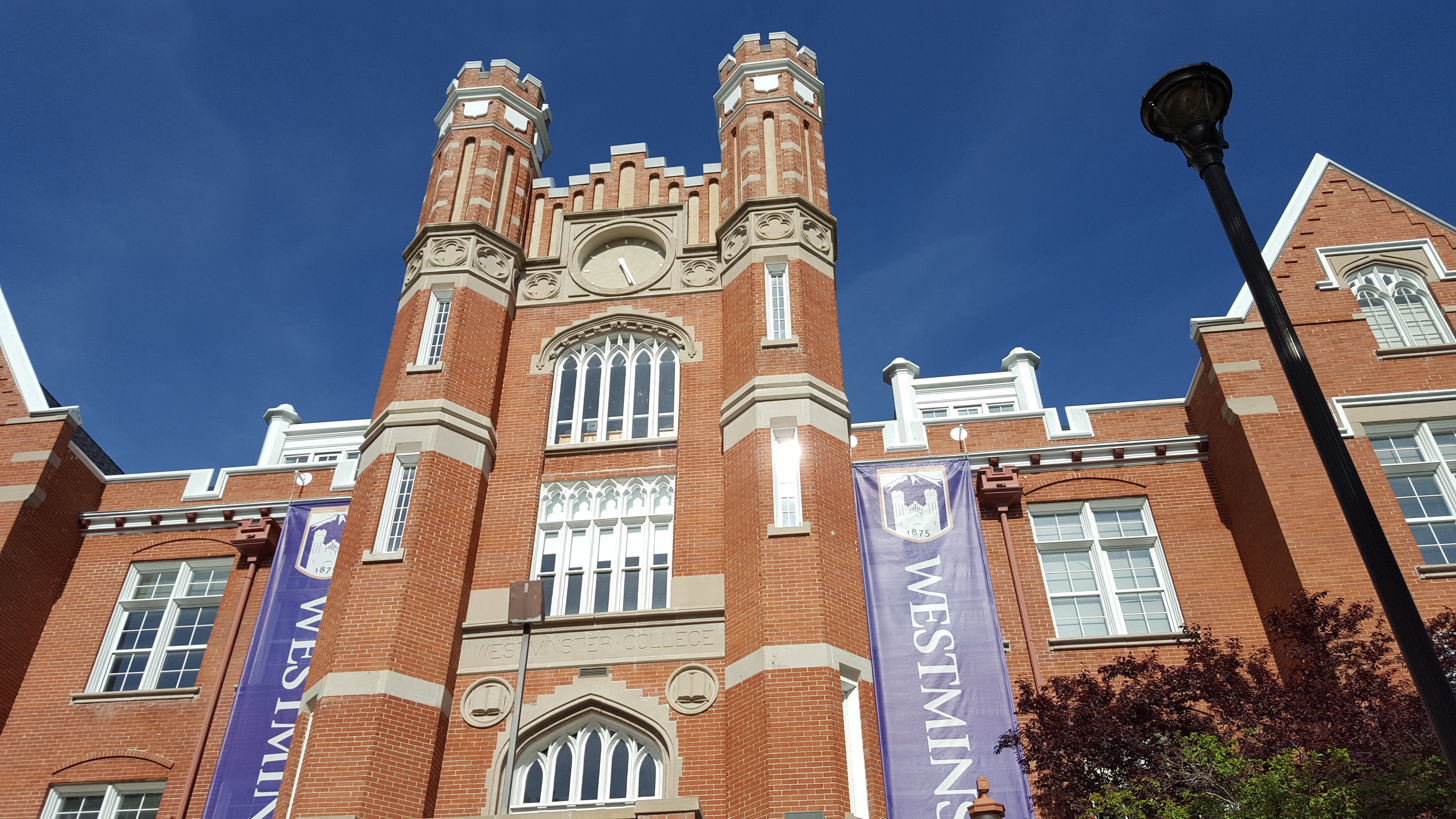
- Converse Hall
- Former names: Salt Lake Collegiate Institute (1875–1897); Sheldon Jackson College (1897–1902); Westminster College (1902–2023)
- Motto: Discendo Vita Abundantior
- Motto in English: Through Learning, a More Abundant Life
- Type: Private university
- Established: 1875; 151 years ago
- Endowment: $79.0 million (2020)
- President: Sylvia Torti
- Faculty: 216
- Students: 1,155 (fall 2024)
- Undergraduates: 842 (fall 2024)
- Postgraduates: 313 (fall 2024)
- Location: Salt Lake City, Utah, United States; 40.7318°N 111.8550°W
- Campus: Urban
- Colors: Purple & Copper
- Nickname: Griffins
- Sporting affiliations: NCAA Division II – RMAC
- Website: westminsteru.edu
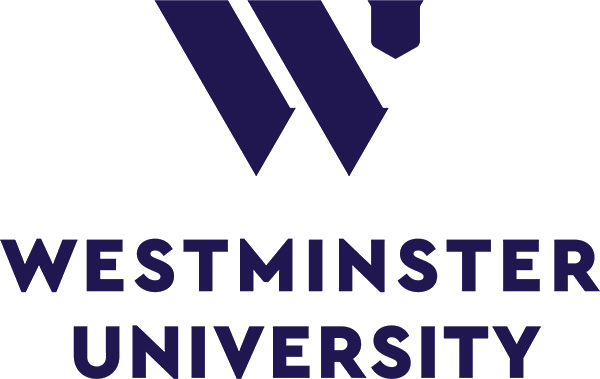

Westminster University is a private university in Salt Lake City, Utah, United States. It was founded in 1875 as a Presbyterian school, though it has since become a secular university. It is not affiliated with The University of Westminster in London or Westminster College in Pennsylvania.

== History ==
=== Early Years ===
Westminster University was initially a Presbyterian liberal arts college, with the founders aiming to convert Mormons and integrate them into the mainstream protestant culture. This caused tension between the religious communities.

Originally it was named Sheldon Jackson College in honor of founder, Sheldon Jackson. In 1897 the college began holding classes on the Salt Lake Collegiate Institute campus. The first graduate was Theodore M. Keusseff in 1901. The school's name was changed to Westminster College in 1902, derived from the Westminster Confession of Faith (a Presbyterian confession of faith), which was named for the district of London.

Westminster struggled to gain financial stability. In the academic year of 1902-03, the college only had two faculty members, two full time college students, and five high school students. The College Institute campus was condemned in 1909 and sold in 1911, forcing Westminster to move in December 1910 to the Sugar House campus where it remains today. Classes were suspended is 1909. High school classes resumed during the 1912-13 academic year and college classes in the fall of 1914.

It 1935, the school began operating as a four-year junior college. However, due to Great Depression, it suffered financially. A campus "master plan," unveiled in 1927, was ultimately canceled. Enrollment decreased severely.

In 1942, during World War II, enrollment continued to remain low. Faculty members left to serve in the military; President Robert D. Steele considered becoming a military chaplain. To address the college's financial problems, the trustees sold 14 acres of land that had previously been used for recreation and agriculture.

In 1944, Westminster was accredited as a four-year college. High school classes ceased in 1945. In 1949, the college began offering bachelor degrees.

=== Post WWII ===
In addition to its strong Presbyterian identity, Westminster had connections to Methodism and the United Church of Christ. Additionally, Westminster forged ties with the Synod of Colorado and Utah in 1970, and the successive organization the Synod of Rocky Mountains in 1974.

The 1960s and '70s were a time of change at Westminster, reflecting the broader cultural changes in the US. In 1979, the college declared a state of "financial exigency." To address the crisis, President C. David Cornell (who had a reputation as an effective fundraiser and administrator) was appointed and implemented a 10-year-plan in 1980 called "A Pursuit of Excellence: The Case for Westminster College." The college further reorganized its finances in 1983; during this overhaul, the college's religious identity was not included in the revised bylaws.

=== 21st Century ===
On September 19, 2022, then-President Bethami Dobkin announced that starting Fall semester 2023, Westminster College would be known as Westminster University to reflect the comprehensive institutional offerings of the school.

Westminster celebrated its 150^{th} anniversary in 2025.

The university was reportedly "on the brink of having to shut down" in June 2026, due to financial difficulties. The university received a D grade (the lowest grade given) from Forbes Magazine in an examination of private colleges. Westminster's administration replied: "We've been here 150 years. We want to be here another 150 years, and we have all the pieces in place to make that happen." They continued that, though the school was facing "headwinds," enrollment was increasing and fiscal management was doing well.

== Campus ==
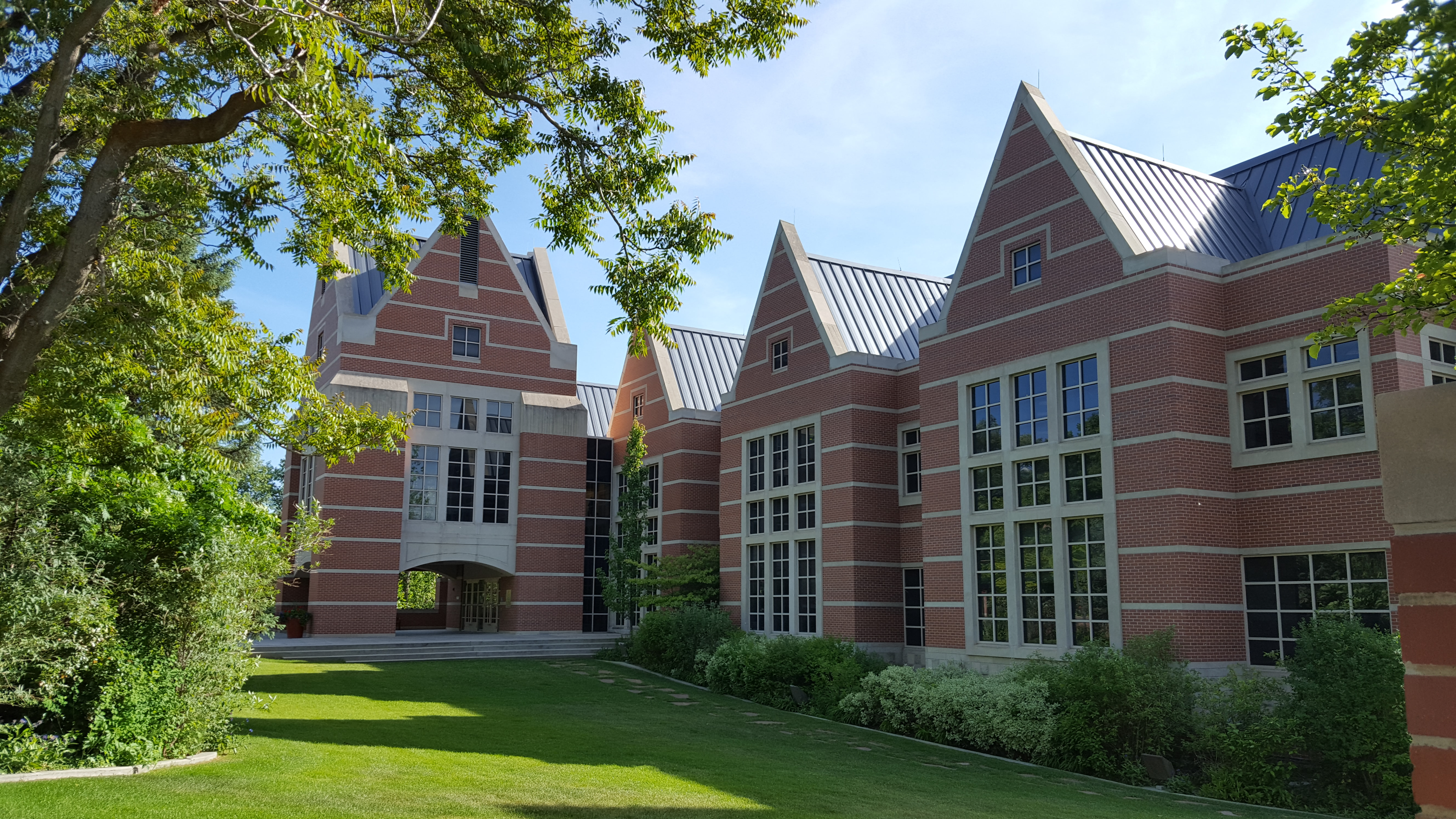
Giovale Library

Originally located downtown on the Salt Lake Collegiate Institute campus, the college moved to its present campus on 27 acres (10.93 ha; 0.04 sq mi) in the Sugar House neighborhood of the city in 1911 where it is still located today. Emigration Creek runs through the campus. This land was donated by Civil War Veteran Colonel William M. Ferry Jr.

On campus are two gyms: the Delores Dore Eccles Health, Wellness and Athletic Center; and the F.R. Payne Gymnasium. The Eccles Health, Wellness, and Athletic Center is a three-story tall, 84,500-square-foot facility that houses a swimming pool, fitness equipment, a weight room, exercise studio, and a 46-foot climbing wall.

In 2009, Westminster acquired the Garfield School (located at 1838 S. 1500 East) from Salt Lake City for $2.2 million. Though the college planned on converting it into a campus extension, the school was never renovated. In late 2016, The Salt Lake Tribune reported that the Elizabeth Academy, a private Montessori school, would purchase the Garfield School.

16^{th} President Michael S. Bassis struck a deal to have Westminster on the Draw built on 1300 East, directly across the street from Sugar House Park. This seven-floor space has many uses. The bottom level is used as academic and event space, the second floor (street level) is used as business space, and the remaining floors are used as housing for upper-classmen and graduate students.

== Administration ==
Westminster University has had 20 presidents since its founding; current president Sylvia Torti was appointed in April 2026. She replaced Bethami Dobkin, who had served as Westminster's president since 2015.

It has an endowment of $79 million as of June 30, 2020. The Board of Trustees added Amy C. Wadsworth, the founding CAO of Salt Lake Arts Academy, after her retirement in June 2019, known for her historical novel reviewed by American western historian Will Bagley.

== Academics ==
The university is accredited by the Northwest Commission on Colleges and Universities. Programs throughout the university are accredited as well.

There are approximately eight students to each faculty member, and a total of 216 faculty. The most common class size is between 10 and 19 people.

The university comprises five schools:

- Bill and Vieve Gore School of Business
- Honors College
- Professional and Continuing Education
- School of Nursing and Health Sciences
- Westminster College of Arts and Sciences, with the School of Education

=== Recognition ===
U.S. News & World Report ranked Westminster in its 2022 "Best College" guide in the following lists: "Best Regional Universities" (No. 18); "Best Value Schools" (No. 19); "Best College for Veterans" (No. 9); and "Best Undergraduate Teaching" (No. 15).

In 2026, The Princeton Review included Westminster University in its non-ranked list "The Best 392 Colleges."

== Student life ==
The university has nearly 90 campus clubs and organizations. The Associated Students of Westminster is the student association on campus. The school newspaper is a bi-weekly called "The Forum". There is also a nationally recognized literary journal known as Ellipsis. The university publishes an alumni magazine, The Westminster Review, on a bi-annual schedule. The Estonian, Westminster's student yearbook, was last published in 1987.

== Athletics ==
The Westminster athletic teams are called the Griffins. The university is a member of the NCAA Division II ranks, primarily competing in the Rocky Mountain Athletic Conference (RMAC) for most of its sports since the 2015–16 academic year (which they were a member on a previous stint from 1967–68 to 1978–79 before suspending its athletics program); while its men's and women's alpine skiing teams compete in the Rocky Mountain Intercollegiate Ski Association (RMISA) affiliated with the NCAA. The Griffins previously competed in the Frontier Conference of the National Association of Intercollegiate Athletics (NAIA) from 1998–99 to 2014–15.

Westminster competes in 15 intercollegiate varsity sports: Men's sports include alpine ski, basketball, cross country, golf, lacrosse, soccer and track & field; while women's sports include alpine ski, basketball, cross country, golf, lacrosse, soccer, track & field and volleyball. Current non-NCAA sports include cheerleading, cycling, dance, men's soccer (club) and snowboard.

=== Olympians ===
More than 50 Olympians have pursued their educational aspirations at Westminster, earning degrees along with 10 medals. The Griffins have competed in at least four Winter Olympic Games. Most of them as part of a 2005–2018 partnership between the college and U.S. Ski and Snowboard. Twenty-three Westminster students made up 10% of Team USA in Sochi and 18 students competed in the 2018 Pyeongchang games. In the 2022 Winter Olympics, 8 Olympians from Westminster represented four countries in Beijing: the U.S., Philippines, Ireland and Slovenia. One alum will compete in qualifying races for the 2022 USA Paralympic alpine skiing team.

=== Athletics history ===
The intercollegiate athletic teams were formerly called the Parsons, and Westminster was a member of the RMAC (in the NAIA), joining the conference in the summer of 1967 for football, basketball, and other team sports. A financial crisis at the school in 1979 caused it to discontinue intercollegiate athletics. Beginning in the 1990s, Westminster gradually began to restore its intercollegiate athletic program in the NAIA as the Griffins; it joined NCAA Division II in 2015 and returned to the RMAC, gaining full member status in 2018.

== Notable alumni ==
- Maude Adams – first American actress to play Peter Pan on Broadway; theatrical lighting and color photography researcher; LGBTQ luminary
- Mildred J. Berryman – pioneering researcher of the lesbian and gay community in post-WWI Utah
- Maddie Bowman – 2014 Olympic gold medalist in ski halfpipe; Team USA, Freestyle Skiing; Two-time Olympian for the US (2014, 2018)
- Les Brown – Tight end for the Miami Dolphins
- Janet H. Clark -Minnesota state legislator
- Joss Christensen – 2014 Olympic gold medalist in slopestyle; Team USA, Freestyle Skiing; One-time Olympian for the US (2014)
- Alex Deibold (2019) – 2014 Olympic bronze medalist in snowboardcross; Team USA, Snowboarding; One-time Olympian for the US (2014)
- Jim Eliopulos – Linebacker for the New York Jets
- Kaitlyn Farrington (2012) – 2014 Olympic gold medalist in halfpipe; Team USA, Snowboarding; One-time Olympian for the US (2014)
- Otto Harbach – Broadway lyricist/librettist
- David Litvack (1994) – Utah State House Representative for the 26th district and Alumni Board member
- Devin Logan (2023) – 2014 Olympic silver medalist in slopestyle; Team USA, Freestyle Skiing; Three-time Olympian for the US (2014, 2018, 2022)
- Jonathan Midol – 2014 Olympic bronze medalist in ski-cross; Team France, Freestyle Skiing; One-time Olympian for France (2014)
- Colby Stevenson – 2022 Olympic silver medalist in big air; Team USA, Freestyle Skiing; One-time Olympian for the US (2022)
- Michael Stockton (2011) – Professional basketball player for Budivelnyk of the Ukrainian Basketball Super League
- Geoff Stradling – Hollywood composer and orchestrator for TV series and movies. Stradling frequently works on movie scores with Ladd McIntosh, a former Westminster professor who led the Westminster Jazz Band to numerous awards in the early 1970s
- Spencer West – Motivational speaker and disability advocate
- Vic Wild – 2014 Olympic gold medalist in parallel giant slalom; Team Russia, Snowboarding; One-time Olympian for Russia (2014)
- Richard D. Wood (1977) – Molecular biologist and winner of the 1998 Meyenburg Prize
