= Bethami Dobkin =

19th President of Westminster University
- In office July 1, 2018 – August 1, 2026
- Succeeded by: Sylvia Torti

Personal details
- Education: California State Polytechnic University, Humboldt; University of Massachusetts Amherst

Bethami A. Dobkin is an American academic administrator and communication scholar who served as the 19th president of Westminster University from July 2018 until her announced retirement in 2026. Her tenure was marked by the institution's transition from a college to a university, significant fundraising, and a public stance against political influence in higher education. Before her presidency, Dobkin served for a decade as provost at Saint Mary's College of California and held faculty and administrative roles at the University of San Diego, beginning in 1990.

== Education ==
Dobkin received a B.A. in speech communication from California State Polytechnic University, Humboldt in 1985. She attended the University of Massachusetts Amherst, where she earned a M.A. in rhetoric in 1987 and a Ph.D. in rhetoric and social order in 1990.

== Career ==
Dobkin began her academic career with faculty positions at the University of Hartford, the University of Connecticut, and the College of Our Lady of the Elms. In 1990, she joined the University of San Diego as an assistant professor of communication studies. In 1992, she published the book, Tales of Terror: Television News and the Construction of the Terrorist Threat. She spent 18 years there, earning tenure and promotion to associate professor in 1996 and full professor in 1999. While at the University of San Diego, she took on several administrative roles, including chair of the department of communication studies from 2000 to 2005 and associate provost from 2005 to 2008.

From February 2008 to February 2018, Dobkin served for 10 years as provost and vice president for academic affairs at Saint Mary's College of California.

Dobkin was appointed the 19th president of Westminster College in 2018, becoming the second woman to hold the post. The timing of her appointment marked the first time in Utah's history that five of the state's colleges and universities were led by women. She began her role on July 1, 2018, and was formally inaugurated on September 29, 2018.

During her tenure, she led fundraising campaigns that raised over $70 million. These funds supported capital projects, including the completion of Florence J. Gillmor Hall and the construction of the L.S. Skaggs Integrated Wellness Center. She launched several new programs, including a Mountain Sports Initiative for Westminster's athletic teams and a "Sophomore Study Away" program. Under her leadership, the university also opened a Community Clinic and Training Center to provide free mental health care to the community. In April 2025, Dobkin was the only university president in Utah to sign a national letter from over 400 college leaders condemning what it termed as "unprecedented" attempts by U.S. president Donald Trump to control higher education. On September 4, 2025, Dobkin announced she would retire at the end of the 2025 to 2026 academic year.
