= James Castleman =

American football player (born 1992)

No. 91
- Position: Defensive end

Personal information
- Born: November 14, 1992 (age 33); Amarillo, Texas, U.S.
- Listed height: 6 ft 2 in (1.88 m)
- Listed weight: 300 lb (136 kg)

Career information
- High school: Amarillo (TX)
- College: Oklahoma State
- NFL draft: 2015: undrafted

Career history
- FXFL Blacktips (2015)
- Stats at Pro Football Reference

James Michael Castleman is an American former football defensive end. He played college football at Oklahoma State. He also played for the FXFL Blacktips of the Fall Experimental Football League (FXFL).

== College career ==
Despite playing as a defensive tackle, he became known for his 48-yard reception in the 2015 Cactus Bowl.

== Professional career ==
Castleman was given tryouts with the National Football League Green Bay Packers and Kansas City Chiefs in 2015 and was signed by neither team.
