= Darron Collins =

American human ecologist and academic administrator

6th President of the College of the Atlantic
- In office 2011 – June 30, 2024
- Preceded by: David F. Hales
- Succeeded by: Sylvia Torti

Personal details
- Born: Darron Asher Collins; 1970 (age 55–56) Morris Plains, New Jersey, U.S.
- Children: 2
- Education: College of the Atlantic (BA); Tulane University (PhD)
- Occupation: Human ecologist, academic administrator

Darron Asher Collins (born 1970) is an American human ecologist and academic administrator specialized in ethnobotany. He became president of the College of the Atlantic in 2011.

== Life ==
Collins is from Morris Plains, New Jersey. His grandmother, Josephine Collins (née Flynn), was born in County Roscommon and immigrated to Morristown, New Jersey in May 1928. Collins was raised in nearby Parsippany–Troy Hills, New Jersey and graduated from Parsippany Hills High School in 1988. He was awarded a Barry M. Goldwater Scholarship and graduated from College of the Atlantic in 1992 with his BA in human ecology. Collins completed a master's degree in Latin American Studies and a Ph.D. in anthropology at Tulane University. During his studies, he researched ethnobotany in Guatemala and became conversant in Qʼeqchiʼ. His 2001 dissertation was titled From Woods to Weeds: Cultural and Ecological Transformations in Alta Verapaz, Guatemala. He also wrote and directed the documentary "Amur River Basin: Sanctuary for the Mighty Taimen". Collins is a Barry Goldwater Science Scholar, a Thomas J. Watson Fellow, and a Fellow National of the Explorers Club, reflecting a career marked by both academic excellence and exploratory achievement.

Before becoming COA's president, Collins spent a decade with the World Wildlife Fund overseeing international conservation projects in the Amazon, Mongolia, and Russian Far East.

Collins worked for the World Wide Fund for Nature for ten years, ending as the managing director of creative assets. He became president of the College of the Atlantic in 2011. Collins is the first COA alumni to hold the position.

Collins lives in Bar Harbor, Maine, with his wife Karen, their two daughters (Maggie and Molly), and their black lab Lucy. In his free time, he enjoys trail running and fly fishing. He is fluent in both Spanish and Q'eqchi'-Maya Preceding 2011, Collins resided in Decatur, Georgia.
