= Victor Aiyewa =

American football player (born 1987)

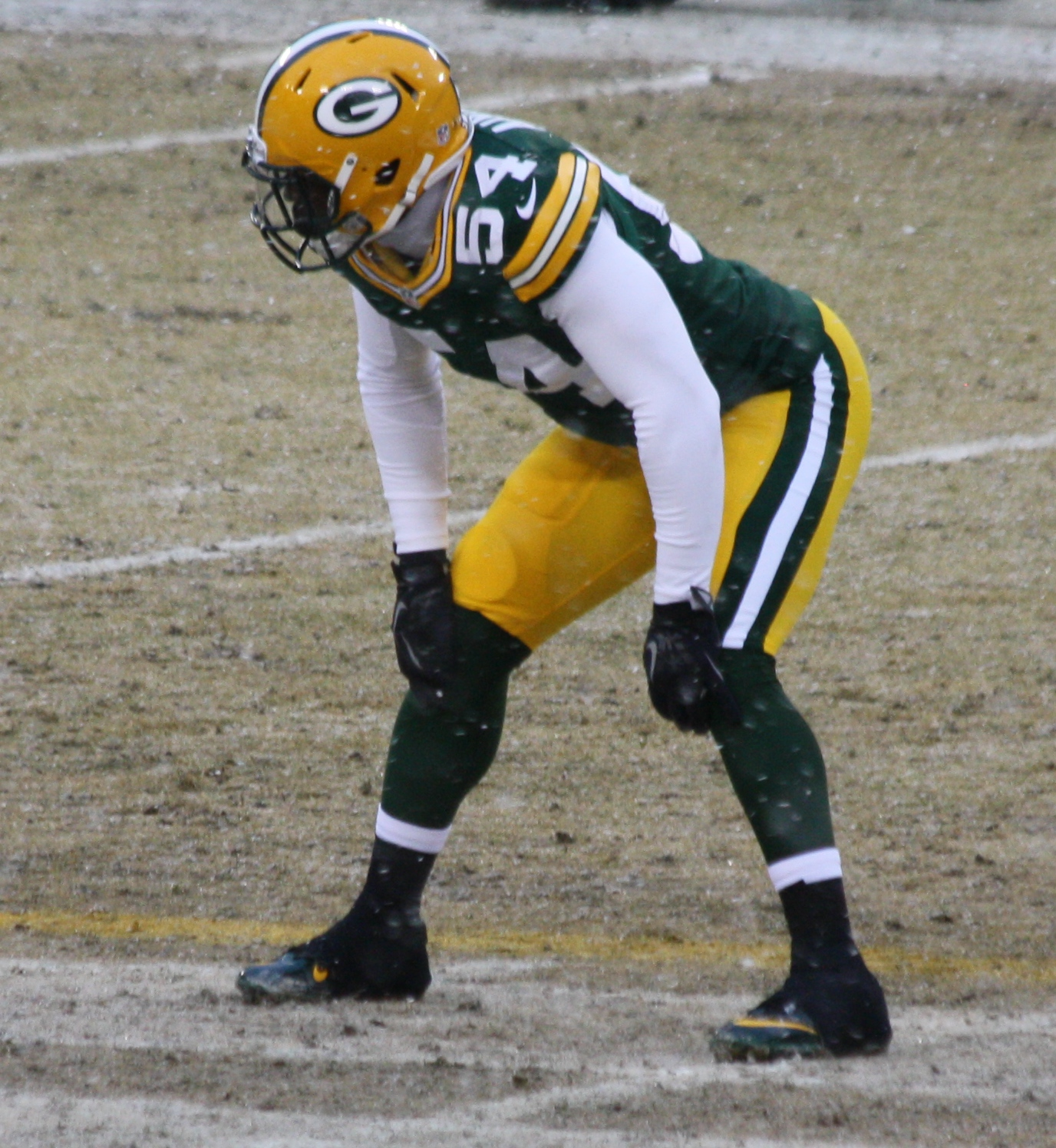
- Aiyewa with the Green Bay Packers in 2013

No. 54
- Position: Linebacker

Personal information
- Born: February 4, 1987 (age 39); Houston, Texas, U.S.
- Listed height: 6 ft 1 in (1.85 m)
- Listed weight: 219 lb (99 kg)

Career information
- High school: Hightower (Missouri City, Texas)
- College: Washington
- NFL draft: 2011: undrafted

Career history
- Tampa Bay Buccaneers (2011)*; Green Bay Packers (2013); San Diego Chargers (2014)*; FXFL Blacktips (2015); BC Lions (2016)*
- * Offseason or practice squad member only

Career NFL statistics
- Total tackles: 4
- Stats at Pro Football Reference

Bamidele Victor Aiyewa (born February 4, 1987) is an American former professional football player who was a linebacker in the National Football League (NFL). He played college football for the Washington Huskies. Aiyewa was signed by the Tampa Bay Buccaneers as an undrafted free agent in 2011. He was also a member of the Green Bay Packers, San Diego Chargers, FXFL Blacktips, and BC Lions.

== Early life ==
Aiyewa was born in Houston, Texas to Juliana Ogunfuye. He attended Hightower High School in Missouri City, Texas where he played as a safety on the Hurricanes football team. His senior year in 2006 saw Aiyewa earn All-District honors as well as being ranked the No. 89th safety recruit in the nation by Scout.com.

== College career ==
Committing to the University of Washington, Aiyewa was one of seven true freshmen for the Huskies. His career began in the 2007 season in which Aiyewa played in all 13 games as a member of special teams. During the 2008 season however, Aiyewa played only four games in which he earned first-team Academic All-Pac-10 honors before sitting out with injuries.

Returning for the 2009 season, Aiyewa played in all 12 games and earned first-team Academic All-Pac-10 for the second straight season. In his final season in 2010, Aiyewa played all 13 games. He once more earned All-Pac-10 honors as well as a 101 Club Academic Award during a team banquet. His senior season honors included ranking No. 1 in All-Pac-10 and No. 4 in the nation. While attending Washington, Aiyema majored in sociology and minored in pre-pharmacy.

== Professional career ==
Pre-draft measurables
Height	Weight	40-yard dash	10-yard split	20-yard split	20-yard shuttle	Three-cone drill	Vertical jump	Broad jump	Bench press
6 ft 1 in (1.85 m)	231 lb (105 kg)	4.52 s	1.51 s	2.83 s	4.62 s	7.27 s	30 in (0.76 m)	9 ft 4 in (2.84 m)	30 reps
All values are from Pro Day

=== Tampa Bay Buccaneers ===
After going undrafted in the 2011 NFL draft, Aiyewa signed with the Tampa Bay Buccaneers on July 28, 2011. On August 10, 2011, he was released by the Buccaneers.

=== Green Bay Packers ===
Aiyewa was signed to the Green Bay Packers' practice squad on October 15, 2013. On November 27, 2013, he was signed from the practice squad to the active roster. Aiyewa was released by the Packers on May 28, 2014. He appeared in five games, totalling four tackles on special teams. Aiyewa saw his first playoff action against the San Francisco 49ers in the NFC Wild Card round, registering a tackle on special teams.

=== San Diego Chargers ===
On August 8, 2014, Aiyewa was signed by the San Diego Chargers. He was released by the Chargers on August 30, 2016.

=== BC Lions ===
Aiyewa was signed by the BC Lions on May 18, 2016. On June 18, 2016, he was released by the Lions.

== Career statistics ==
Source: NFL.com

Year	Team	G	GS	Tackles					Interceptions						Fumbles	
Year	Team	G	GS	Total	Solo	Ast	Sck	SFTY	PDef	Int	Yds	Avg	Lng	TDs	FF	FR
Regular season
2013	GB	5	0	4	4	0	0.0	0	0	0	0	0.0	0	0	0	0
Total		5	0	4	4	0	0.0	0	0	0	0	0.0	0	0	0	0
Postseason
2013	GB	1	0	1	1	0	0.0	0	0	0	0	0.0	0	0	0	0
Total		1	0	1	1	0	0.0	0	0	0	0	0.0	0	0	0	0

== Personal ==
Aiyewa's mother was threatened with deportation to Nigeria.
