= Les Brown (American football) =

American football player (born 1987)

Les Brown V
No. 87
- Position: Tight end

Personal information
- Born: June 29, 1987 (age 39); Provo, Utah
- Listed height: 6 ft 4 in (1.93 m)
- Listed weight: 245 lb (111 kg)

Career information
- High school: Salt Lake City (UT) Highland
- College: Westminster College (UT)
- NFL draft: 2012: undrafted

Career history
- Miami Dolphins (2012)*; FXFL Blacktips (2015)
- * Offseason or practice squad member only

Les Brown V is an American former football tight end for the FXFL Blacktips of the Fall Experimental Football League (FXFL). An undrafted free agent prior to 2012, Brown was signed and subsequently released by the Miami Dolphins of the National Football League (NFL) during the offseason, as was documented in the 2012 season of documentary television series Hard Knocks. Prior to joining the Dolphins, Brown was a finance student and college basketball player.

== High school and college ==
Brown attended Judge Memorial and Highland high schools in Salt Lake City, Utah, where he played basketball, football, and baseball. As a junior, Brown was an all-state wide receiver, leading the state of Utah in regular season TD receptions. Brown was recruited and had scholarship opportunities in all three sports, including invites at BYU, Oregon, and Washington State to play football. Brown made the decision to play basketball at Westminster College and pursue a degree in finance. Brown, a 6’4", 190-pound shooting guard, played in 91 games over three years for the Griffins. In 2009, Brown accepted a Finance Internship in the Salt Lake City office of Huntsman Gay Global Capital, a private equity firm. He later returned to the firm's West Palm Beach office, but after seven months, he chose to go back to Utah to complete his finance degree.

While checking out pro trainers to help his brother Braden, an offensive tackle at BYU, prepare for a possible future in the NFL, Brown met a trainer who opened his eyes to his own NFL potential. Trainer Chad Ikei, of Ikei Sports Hawaii, remained persistent and soon Brown chose to put his college education on hold and move to Oahu to train full-time with other NFL prospects. The news of postponing his degree for a second time stirred skepticism from many of Brown's friends. During a three-month boot camp that included a strict diet and three training sessions a day, six days a week, Brown bulked up to 240 pounds and cut his body fat in half.

== Pro day ==
After signing with sports agent Michael Ballard of MB Sports, Brown participated in the pro-day at Brigham Young University on March 29, 2012, where he had the best numbers of any athlete at the event with his 39" vertical leap, 10' 3" broad jump, and 4.43-second 40-yard dash. After Brown's impressive showing, he received calls from the Philadelphia Eagles, New York Giants, Oakland Raiders, and Indianapolis Colts, with the Eagles, Green Bay Packers, and Miami Dolphins being the first teams to invite him to private workouts.

== Professional career ==
=== Miami Dolphins ===
Before he was able to participate in all of the workouts of the interested clubs, the Dolphins persuaded Brown to sign with them. Brown signed a three-year minimum deal, which included a signing bonus.

He was waived on August 23, 2012.
