= Carl-Henrik Heldin =

Swedish molecular biologist

Carl-Henrik Heldin (born 9 August 1952) is Chairman of the Board for the Nobel Foundation, and a molecular biologist and medical researcher. He has been director of the Uppsala branch of Ludwig Cancer Research since 1986 and professor in molecular cell biology at the medical faculty of Uppsala University since 1992. He is vice-president of the European Research Council since 2011 and was appointed chairman of the Nobel Foundation in 2013. Since 2016 he is member of the jury of the Ernst Schering Prize.

His research has focused on the mechanisms of signal transduction by growth regulatory factors like platelet-derived growth factor (PDGF) and transforming growth factor (TGF).

He was senior editor of Cancer Research from 2003 to 2009.

== Membership in Learned societies and Doctor honoris causa ==
He is a member of the following learned societies

- 1989 European Molecular Biology Organization.
- 1991 Royal Swedish Academy of Sciences.
- 1999 Academia Europaea.
- 2002 Japanese Association for Cancer Research.
- 2006 Finnish Society of Sciences and Letters.
- 2006 Scan Balt Academy
- 2007 Hellenic Biochemical Society
- 2009 Norwegian Academy of Science and Letters
- 2009 European Academy of Cancer Sciences

He is honorary doctor of University of Patras, University of Helsinki, University of Turku and University of Heidelberg.

== Awards ==
Heldin has been awarded several prizes, including

- 1989 Prix Antoine Lacassagne, French National Organization against Cancer (shared with D. Gospodarowicz).
- 1992 EMBO Medal
- 1993 K. Fernström Large Medical Prize for Nordic Scientists (with B. Westermark).
- 1994 Pezcoller-AACR Award Pezcoller Foundation and American Ass. for Cancer Research.
- 2002 Meyenburg Prize German Cancer Center, Heidelberg.
- 2011 Berzelius Medal. Swedish Medical Society
- 2011 Rudbeck Medal. Uppsala University
- 2016 H. M. The King's Medal, 12th size gold medal on Seraphim Order ribbon
- 2023 The Order of the Rising Sun, Gold and Silver Star

== Personal life ==
Heldin is Swedish. He is married and has two children born in 1982 and 1988.

Non-profit organization positions
Preceded by Marcus Storch	Chairman of the Nobel Foundation; 2013–present	Incumbent
