= Richard Wood (molecular biologist) =

American molecular biologist (born 1955)

- Education: Westminster College; UC Berkeley
- Awards: FRS (1997); EMBO Membership (1998); Meyenburg Prize (1998); Fellow AAAS (2013); Fellow Am. Acad Arts & Sci (2018); EMGS Award (2021)
- Scientific career
- Fields: DNA Repair, Mutagenesis
- Workplaces: Yale University; ICRF; UC Berkeley; University of Pittsburgh; MD Anderson
- Doctoral advisors: H. John Burki
- Other academic advisors: Franklin Hutchinson; Tomas Lindahl
- Website: Wood Laboratory

Richard D. Wood (born June 3, 1955 in Boulder, Colorado) is an American molecular biologist specializing in research on DNA repair and mutation. He is known for pioneering studies on nucleotide excision repair (NER), particularly for reconstituting the minimum set of proteins involved in this process, identifying proliferating cell nuclear antigen (PCNA) as part of the NER complex and identifying mammalian repair polymerases.

The NER DNA repair pathway is a complex mechanism that cells use to repair DNA damage caused by ultraviolet sun exposure. The pathway is essential to life, and children born with mutations in genes coding for NER proteins develop xeroderma pigmentosum or XP. XP patients cannot repair DNA mutations, particularly pyrimidine dimers, caused by UV and must be continuously protected from sunlight to prevent fatal skin scarring and cancers. By the 1980s, scientists (notably Aziz Sancar) had uncovered how NER works in bacteria but this pathway remained poorly understood in mammalian cells.

Wood's first breakthrough came in 1988, after he moved to England to work at the Imperial Cancer Research Fund with Tomas Lindahl (Lindahl, Sancar and Paul Modrich later would receive the 2015 Nobel Prize in Chemistry for their contributions to DNA repair). Working in Lindahl's lab, Wood developed a way to perform NER on DNA in a test tube using crude cell-free extracts from tissues. By performing this test on extracts derived from blood cells of children with XP, Wood could begin deciphering which different proteins are involved in the NER process. Extracts from group A XP cells, for example, could be “complemented” to resume DNA repair by adding cellular extracts obtained from group C XP patients (who have a normal group A protein but a non-functional group C protein).

Wood established his own group at ICRF and over the next decade, performed a series of biochemistry experiments to understand each step in the repair process by adding individual, purified proteins. Repair (particularly of UV-induced pyrimidine dimers) includes recognition of the damaged site (probably by sensing an unpaired bubble at the mutation site), nicking the DNA at upstream and downstream sites, excising the damaged DNA, then filling in the single-stranded DNA gap using a polymerase, with the opposite strand serving as a template for the proper sequence for the repair patch. Since multiple proteins are involved in NER, different XP patients may have different gene mutations (called "complementation groups" based on which enzyme is defective in the NER pathway). Ultimately, his group showed that the entire NER pathway could be performed synthetically by reconstituting 30 different purified proteins, allowing him to define DNA repair at the molecular level. Since returning to the United States, his laboratory has focused on the role polymerases play in making ‘emergency’ translesion repairs that lead to additional mutational errors and contribute to cancers.

Wood received his B.S. degree in Biology from Westminster College, Salt Lake City Utah (1977), his Ph.D. degree in Biophysics at the University of California, Berkeley (1981), and was a postdoctoral fellow at Yale University from 1982 to 1985. He currently is J. Ralph Meadows Professor in Carcinogenesis at the University of Texas MD Anderson Cancer Center and was elected to the US National Academy of Sciences in 2023. He is a jazz bassist (he was a college roommate of the Hollywood composer and orchestrator Geoff Stradling) and plays in local bands and together with his wife Enid Wood, a violinist and artist.

== Awards ==
- Elected American Academy of Arts & Sciences (2018)
- Elected AAAS Fellow (2013)
- Meyenburg Cancer Research Prize (1998)
- Elected EMBO Membership (1998)
- Elected Fellow of the Royal Society (1997)
- Elected Member of the US National Academy of Sciences (2023)
