= Hard Knocks (2001 TV series) =

Reality sports documentary television series

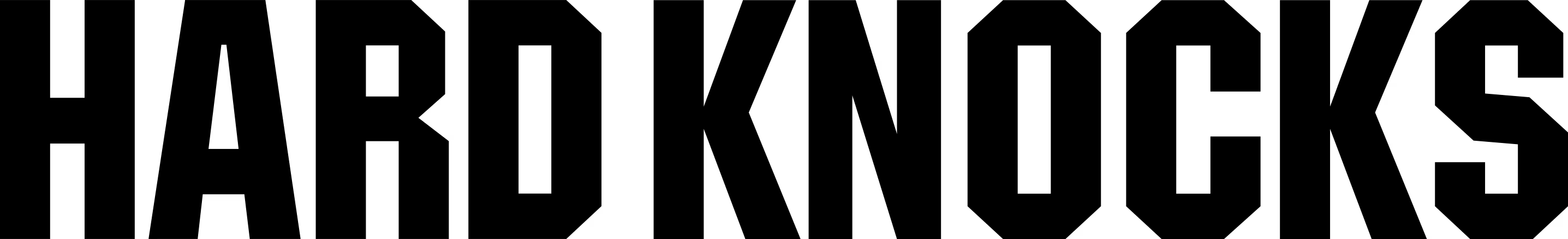
- Genre: Sports; Reality television Documentary series
- Created by: Marty Callner
- Starring: Baltimore Ravens (2001); Dallas Cowboys (2002, 2008, 2021); Kansas City Chiefs (2007); Cincinnati Bengals (2009, 2013); New York Jets (2010, 2023); Miami Dolphins (2012, 2023 in-season); Atlanta Falcons (2014); Houston Texans (2015); Los Angeles Rams (2016, 2020); Tampa Bay Buccaneers (2017); Cleveland Browns (2018); Oakland Raiders (2019); Los Angeles Chargers (2020); Indianapolis Colts (2021 in-season); Detroit Lions (2022); Arizona Cardinals (2022 in-season); New York Giants (2024 Offseason); Chicago Bears (2024); Buffalo Bills (2025); Seattle Seahawks (2026)
- Narrated by: Liev Schreiber (2001-2002 & 2008–present); Paul Rudd (2007)
- Composer: Dave Robidoux
- Country of origin: United States
- Original language: English
- No. of seasons: 24
- No. of episodes: 105

Production
- Executive producers: Steve Sabol; Rick Bernstein; Ross Greenburg; Marty Callner
- Producers: Ken Rodgers; Keith Cossrow
- Production location: Varies
- Running time: 55 minutes
- Production companies: HBO Sports; NFL Films; Skydance Sports (2024 Offseason)

Original release
- Network: HBO
- Release: August 1, 2001 – present

Hard Knocks is a reality sports documentary television series produced by NFL Films for HBO. First broadcast in 2001, the show typically follows a National Football League (NFL) team through its training camp and covers the team's preparation for the upcoming football season. Beginning in 2021, the show has also dedicated an additional season of television to following an additional team throughout the NFL regular season, followed by an additional season to follow another team through the NFL offseason starting in 2024.

The series depicts the personal and professional lives of players, coaches, and staff, including their family life, position battles, and even inside jokes and pranks. It particularly focuses on rookies' adjustments to playing in the NFL, usually with emphasis on the team's most recent top draft pick. It usually also chooses to focus on undrafted and journeyman players who are attempting to make the team.

The NFL and HBO have called Hard Knocks "the first sports-based reality series" in television history. The 20th season featured the New York Jets in their second appearance on the show, as well as the Miami Dolphins. In 2024, the series expanded to cover a team in the offseason (New York Giants), during training camp (Chicago Bears), and will feature an entire division during the regular season (AFC North).

== Production ==
The series was created by Marty Callner in 2001. It has been narrated by Liev Schreiber since its inception, with the only exception being the 2007 season, which was narrated by Paul Rudd, a fan of the Kansas City Chiefs, who appeared on the show that year.

The San Francisco 49ers, Atlanta Falcons, Seattle Seahawks, Houston Texans, and Washington Redskins each declined to be the show's featured team for the 2013 season, while the Cincinnati Bengals accepted, marking their second appearance on the show. NFL Commissioner Roger Goodell subsequently said that he wanted more teams to be featured on the series, on "some kind of formal rotation."

NFL Films announced on July 18, 2013, that it had signed a multiyear contract extension with HBO to continue producing the show.

In October 2013 the NFL announced that, in the absence of a team volunteering to participate in Hard Knocks, the league could force a team to participate. Teams are exempt from being forced to participate in three circumstances - if they have appeared in the past ten years, if they have a first-year head coach, or they reached the playoffs in either of the two preceding seasons. The first two teams to appear after this ruling were the Falcons and the Texans, appearing on the series in 2014 and 2015 respectively, after both teams declined to appear in 2013.

In September 2021, NFL Network announced that the Indianapolis Colts would become the subject of the first ever in-season edition of the series. The series premiered in November 2021 and would have carried on through the 2021–22 NFL playoffs, but the Colts did not qualify.

In May 2024, the NFL announced that the New York Giants would become the subject of the first-ever offseason edition of the series. The series would premiere in July 2024 and feature the organization's 100th season and highlight their moves from January to July of the offseason.

During the 2025 offseason the rule exempting teams from participating in the series if they reached the playoffs in either of the two preceding seasons was removed. The Buffalo Bills, who had made the playoffs the preceding 6 seasons, were selected for the show. Teams that have appeared on the training camp version of the show in the past eight seasons and teams that are part of the in-season division selected or next year's in-season division season or Hard Knocks are exempt from participating in the series.

In April 2026, the NFL announced that the Seattle Seahawks and New England Patriots were selected for the next two editions of the show in 2026 and 2027, respectively.

== Seasons ==
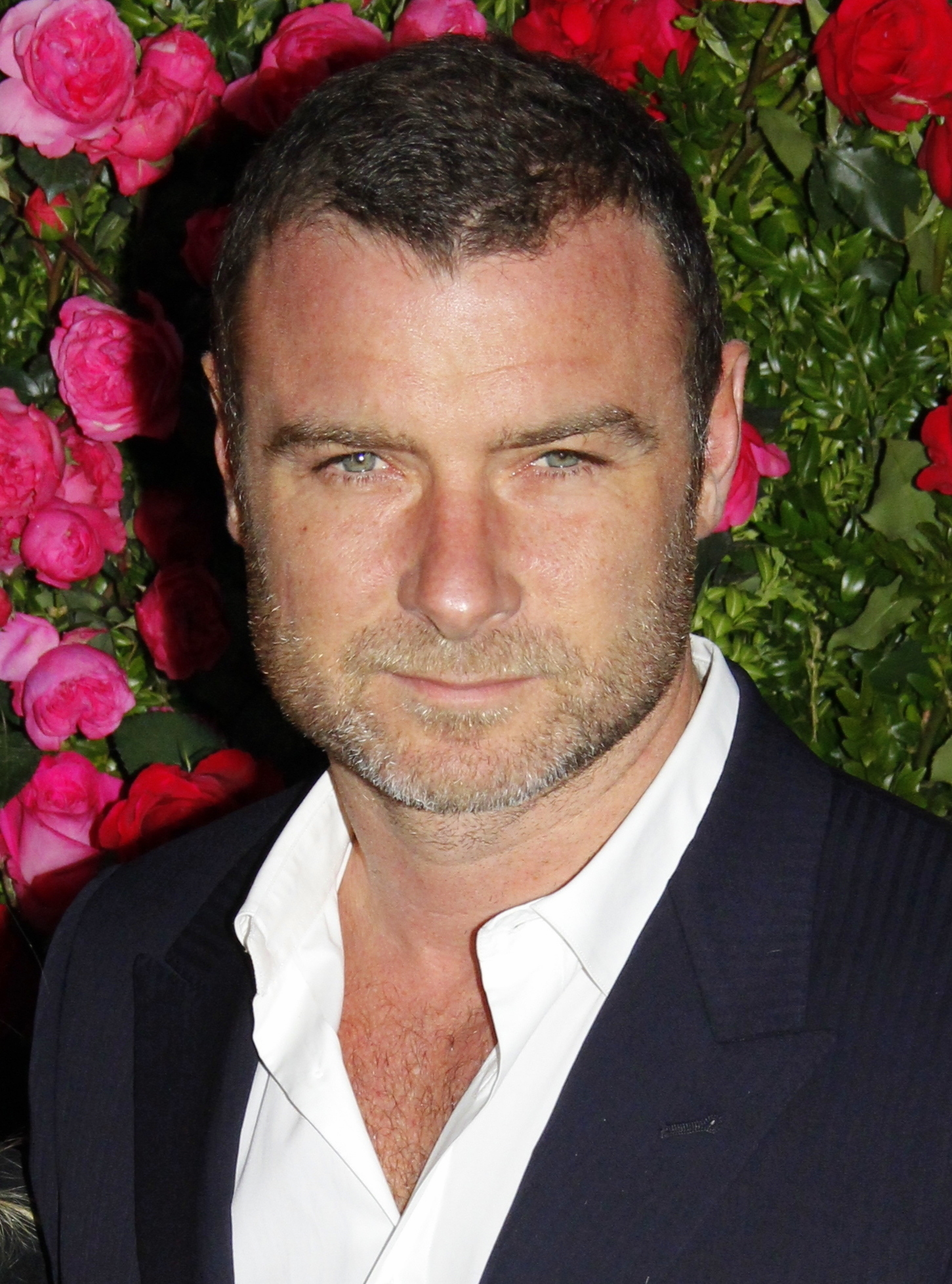
Hard Knocks narrator Liev Schreiber

Season	Year	Team
1	2001	Baltimore Ravens
2	2002	Dallas Cowboys
3	2007	Kansas City Chiefs
4	2008	Dallas Cowboys
5	2009	Cincinnati Bengals
6	2010	New York Jets
Special	2011	N/A
7	2012	Miami Dolphins
8	2013	Cincinnati Bengals
9	2014	Atlanta Falcons
10	2015	Houston Texans
11	2016	Los Angeles Rams
12	2017	Tampa Bay Buccaneers
13	2018	Cleveland Browns
14	2019	Oakland Raiders
15	2020	Los Angeles Chargers
15	2020	Los Angeles Rams
16	2021	Dallas Cowboys
17	2021	Indianapolis Colts (in season)
18	2022	Detroit Lions
19	2022	Arizona Cardinals (in season)
20	2023	New York Jets
21	2023	Miami Dolphins (in season)
22	2024	New York Giants (offseason)
23	2024	Chicago Bears
24	2024	AFC North (in season)
25	2025	Buffalo Bills
26	2025	NFC East (in season)
27	2026	Seattle Seahawks
28	2027	New England Patriots

=== Baltimore Ravens (2001) ===
Some of the issues covered in the 2001 Ravens season include:

- The team looking to repeat as Super Bowl winners.
- Rookies Todd Heap and Dwayne Missouri's adjustment to professional football.
- The team's adjustment after a season-ending injury to Jamal Lewis.
- The veterans on the team in the final years of their careers (Shannon Sharpe, Rod Woodson, Qadry Ismail, and Tony Siragusa).
- The quarterback competition between Elvis Grbac and Randall Cunningham.
- Ozzie Newsome and Brian Billick's management of the team.

=== Dallas Cowboys (2002) ===
Some of the issues covered in the 2002 Cowboys season include:

- Quincy Carter's pressure to stay the consistent starting quarterback and the acquisition of Chad Hutchinson as a backup quarterback.
- Rookie Roy Williams's adjustment to professional football.
- Emmitt Smith beginning his final season in Dallas, and his pursuit to become the NFL's all-time rushing yards leader.
- Dave Campo heading into his third (and eventually, final) season as Dallas's head coach.
- The training of the Dallas Cowboys Cheerleaders.

=== Kansas City Chiefs (2007) ===
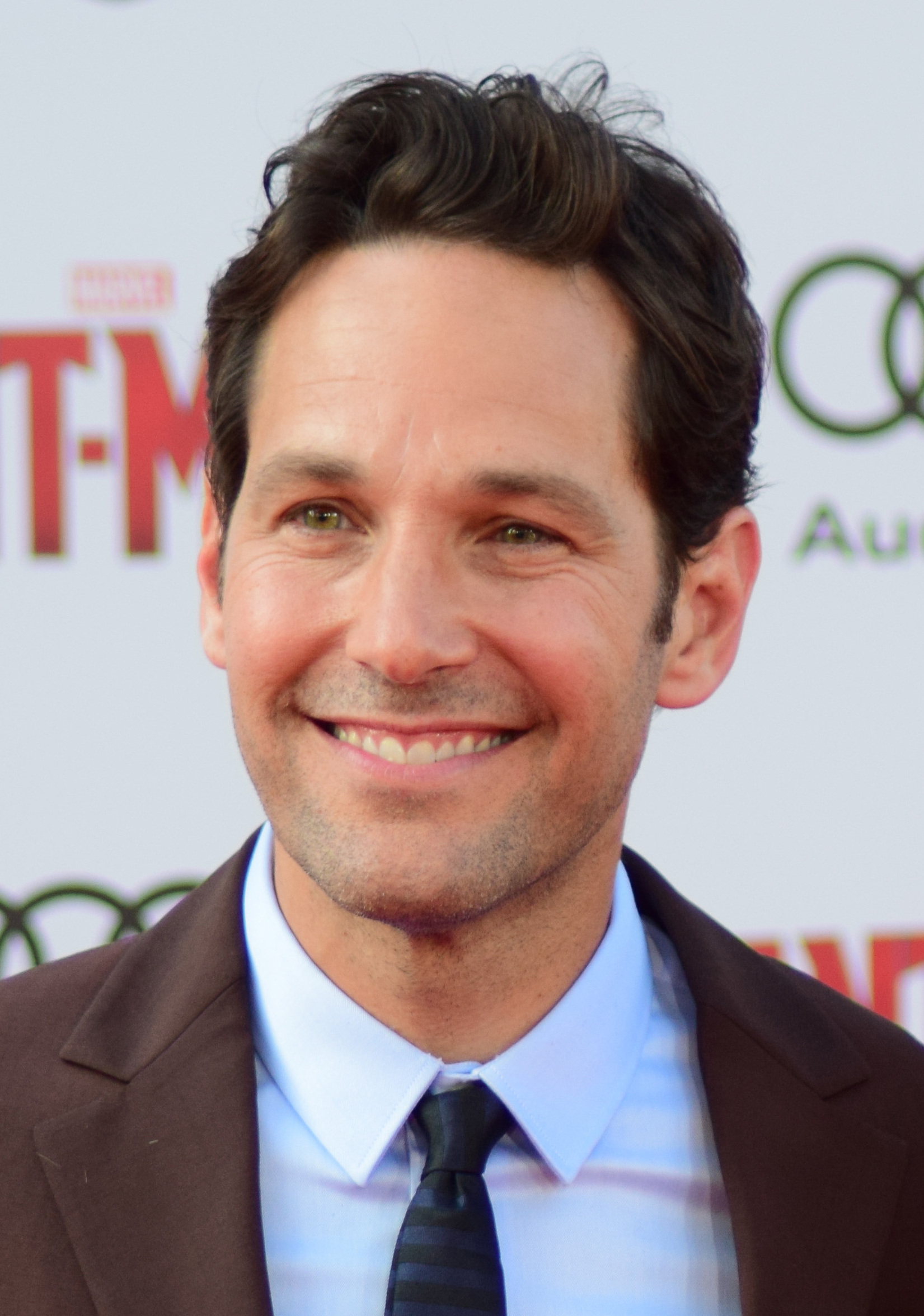
Actor and Chiefs fan Paul Rudd narrated the 2007 season of Hard Knocks

The series returned on August 8, 2007, featuring the Kansas City Chiefs and their preparations for the 2007 season. It is the only season of the series not narrated by Liev Schreiber. Instead, actor and Chiefs fan Paul Rudd was the narrator.

Some of the issues covered in the 2007 Chiefs season include:

- The battle for the starting quarterback job between veteran Damon Huard and second-year player Brodie Croyle following the trade of Trent Green.
- Star running back Larry Johnson's contract holdout.
- Priest Holmes's attempted return to football after missing all of 2006 after a career-threatening neck injury.
- The contract holdout and later development of rookie wide receiver Dwayne Bowe, the Chiefs' first-round draft pick of 2007.
- Boomer Grigsby's switch from linebacker to fullback.
- The development of rookie defensive linemen Tank Tyler and Turk McBride.
- The competition between two undrafted cornerbacks - Tyron Brackenridge and Dimitri Patterson.
- Arena Football League star Bobby Sippio's attempt to catch on with an outdoor team.

=== Dallas Cowboys (2008) ===
The Dallas Cowboys were chronicled for the second time on the television series' fourth season, which premiered on August 6, 2008.

Some of the issues covered in the 2008 Cowboys season include:

- Cornerback Adam "Pacman" Jones' reinstatement into the NFL.
- Cameron Fegreus (free agent from Woodhaven, Michigan) attempting to make the team.
- Keon Lattimore, a younger brother of Ray Lewis, competing for a job.
- Todd Lowber, a very athletic wide receiver new to the game of football, trying to make the team.
- Undersized wide receiver Danny Amendola competing for a job.
- Rookies Felix Jones and Martellus Bennett adjusting to NFL camp for the first time.

=== Cincinnati Bengals (2009) ===
The Cincinnati Bengals season premiered on August 12, 2009. Its ratings were higher than any previous season of Hard Knocks, and it won two Sports Emmy Awards: one for Outstanding Edited Sports Series or Anthology, and one for Outstanding Post Produced Audio / Sound.

Some of the issues covered in the 2009 Bengals season include:

- The battle for the starting fullback position between Jeremi Johnson, Chris Pressley, Fui Vakapuna, and J.D. Runnels.
- The injuries of tight ends Reggie Kelly and Ben Utecht, and the adjustment of rookie tight end Chase Coffman to the NFL.
- The contract holdout of offensive tackle Andre Smith, the Bengals' first-round draft pick of 2009.
- The battle for the starting strong safety position between veteran Roy Williams and Chinedum Ndukwe.
- The recovery effort of starting quarterback Carson Palmer from an injury-plagued 2008 season.
- The antics and catchphrases of wide receiver Chad Ochocinco (as he referred to before changing his name back to Chad Johnson in 2012).
- The development and maturation of wide receiver Chris Henry.

=== New York Jets (2010) ===
The New York Jets were chronicled in the series' sixth season. An official announcement was made on March 25, 2010, and HBO began airing it on August 11, 2010. It won the series' second consecutive Sports Emmy Award for Outstanding Edited Sports Series or Anthology. The Jets declined another opportunity to appear in the series in 2011.

Some of the issues covered in the 2010 Jets season include:

- The vocal coaching style of head coach Rex Ryan, highlighted by several sound bites that became popular after the season, such as "That's being a jackass!" and "Let's go eat a goddamn snack!"
- Cornerback Darrelle Revis's contract holdout.
- The battle for the starting fullback position between veteran Tony Richardson, journeyman Jason Davis and rookie John Conner.
- Second-year starting quarterback Mark Sanchez's development as the "face" of the franchise.
- Kris Jenkins's return after ACL surgery.
- Running back Danny Woodhead's attempt to make the team.
- Cornerback Antonio Cromartie attempting (and failing) to name all 9 of his children.

=== Hard Knocks: A Decade of NFL Training Camps (2011) ===
At the end of July 2011, NFL Films announced it would not be producing Hard Knocks for the 2011 season. No team wanted to commit to the series due to uncertainty with the NFL's labor situation. A retrospective on the series titled Hard Knocks: A Decade of NFL Training Camps was made featuring clips from every episode made to that point, and including comments looking back on the series from Brian Billick, Shannon Sharpe, Mike Westhoff, and others.

=== Miami Dolphins (2012) ===
On May 29, 2012, Miami Dolphins head coach Joe Philbin announced that the team would participate in the 2012 season of Hard Knocks.

Some of the issues covered in the 2012 Dolphins season include:

- The contract negotiation of Ryan Tannehill, followed by his development as a rookie quarterback in the NFL.
- The quarterback position battle between Matt Moore, David Garrard and Ryan Tannehill, with Tannehill winning the starting job after week 2 of the pre-season.
- The health issues of David Garrard, especially after undergoing knee surgery during training camp. He was released from the team the same day this season's final episode aired.
- The difficulty of Les Brown in adjusting from former college basketball player to NFL tight end, and his subsequent release from the team.
- The meeting in which Philbin informs Chad Johnson (formerly Chad Ochocinco) of his release from the team following his arrest for allegedly headbutting his wife of 41 days.
- The meeting in which general manager Jeff Ireland informs cornerback Vontae Davis that he was traded to the Indianapolis Colts for two future draft picks.

=== Cincinnati Bengals (2013) ===
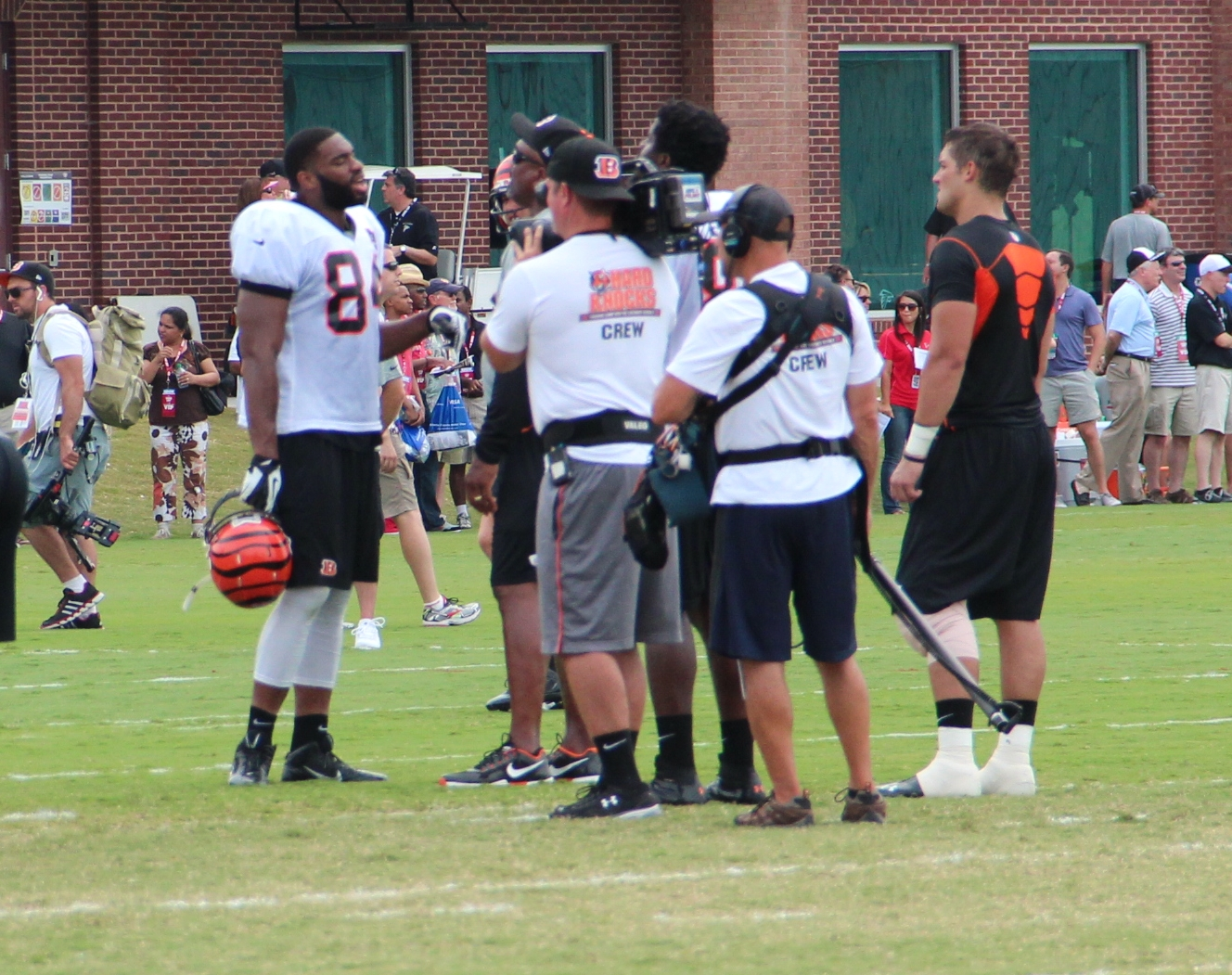
Hard Knocks film crew with Jermaine Gresham, 2013

The Cincinnati Bengals were featured in the 2013 season, which was the team's second appearance on the show. The first episode of the season premiered on August 6, 2013.

Some of the issues covered in the 2013 Bengals season include:

- Rookie defensive tackle Larry Black's season-ending injury
- Linebacker James Harrison's dislike of the camera crew at training camp
- The backup quarterback position battle between Josh Johnson and John Skelton
- Estonian rookie defensive end Margus Hunt's adjustment to the NFL and life in the U.S.
- The fullback position battle between veteran John Conner and converted tight end Orson Charles
- The linebacker position battle between undrafted rookies Jayson DiManche and Bruce Taylor.
- Linebacker Aaron Maybin's struggle to stay on the team and his pursuit of painting.

=== Atlanta Falcons (2014) ===
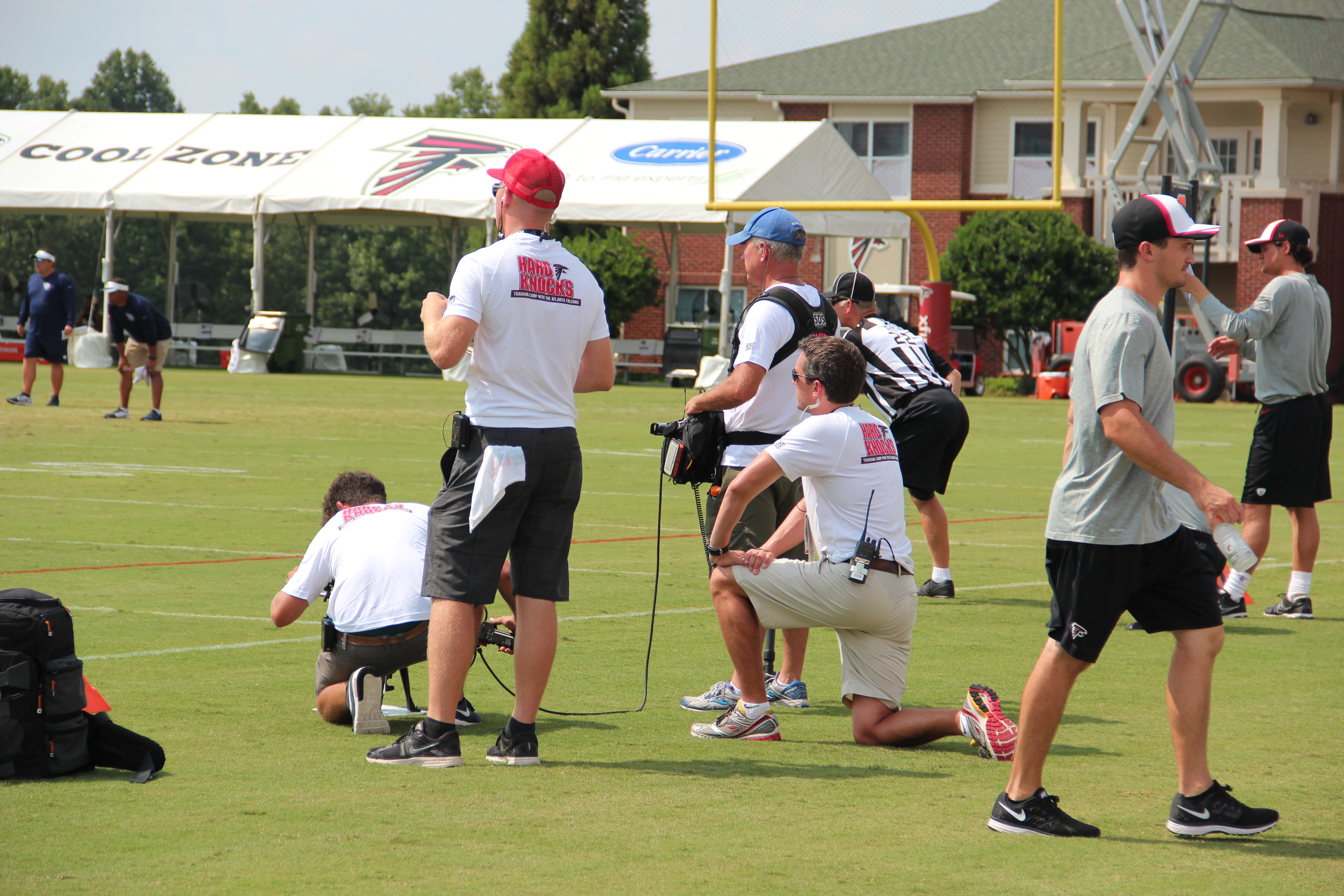
Hard Knocks film crew at Atlanta Falcons training camp, 2014

On June 12, 2014, the Atlanta Falcons announced that the team would participate in the 2014 season of Hard Knocks premiering on August 5, 2014.

Some of the issues covered in the 2014 Falcons season include:

- The Falcons attempt to build more toughness into the team after a disappointing 2013 season.
- Veteran Kroy Biermann's attempt to return from a major injury and switch positions.
- Rookies Tyler Starr and Jacques Smith's attempt to make the team.

=== Houston Texans (2015) ===
On May 27, 2015, it was announced the Houston Texans would be the team featured for the 2015 season premiering on August 11, 2015.

Some of the issues covered in the 2015 Texans season include:

- Head coach Bill O'Brien trying to lead the team to the playoffs after finishing just short in 2014.
- The quarterback battle between Ryan Mallett and Brian Hoyer.
- Vince Wilfork bringing leadership and experience to Houston.
- J.J. Watt working out to Fort Minor's Remember The Name
- Jadeveon Clowney returning from a torn meniscus.
- Reigning Defensive Player of the Year J. J. Watt trying to become an even better player.
- Rookies Kevin Johnson and Jaelen Strong adjusting to life in the NFL.
- David Quessenberry recovering from cancer.
- Charles James, Kourtnei Brown, and Uzoma Nwachukwu try to make the team.

=== Los Angeles Rams (2016) ===
On March 23, 2016, it was announced the Los Angeles Rams would be the team featured for the 2016 season premiering on August 9, 2016.

Some of the issues covered in the 2016 Rams season include:

- The team moving back to Los Angeles after spending 21 years in St. Louis
- Head coach Jeff Fisher releasing the previous season's starting quarterback Nick Foles over the telephone
- First overall draft pick Jared Goff's first experiences in the NFL
- Eric Kush fighting for a spot on the roster
- William Hayes' unconventional beliefs about the existence of mermaids and dinosaurs.

=== Tampa Bay Buccaneers (2017) ===
On April 19, 2017, it was announced the Tampa Bay Buccaneers would be the team featured for the 2017 season premiering on August 8, 2017.

=== Cleveland Browns (2018) ===
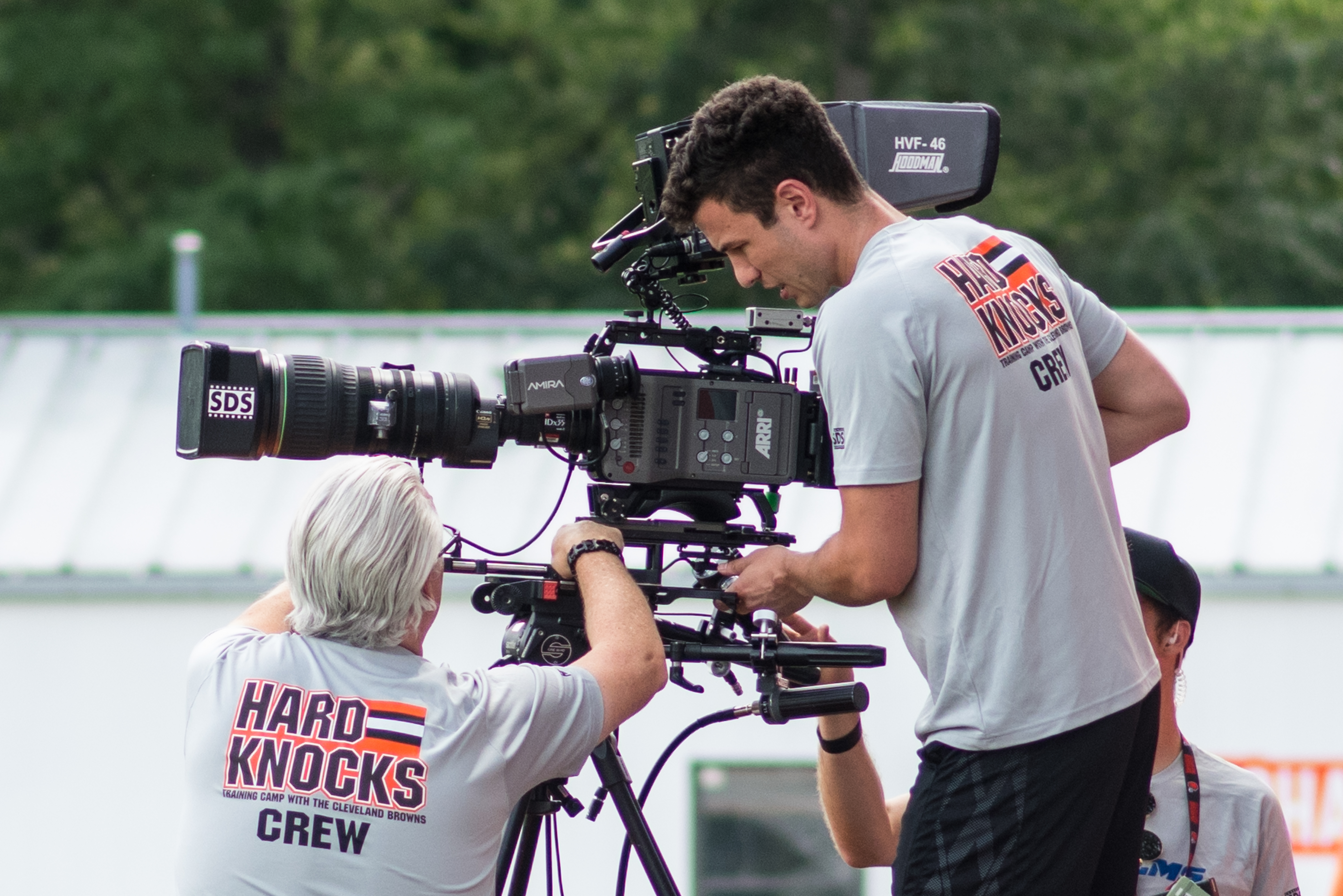
Hard Knocks film crew at Cleveland Browns training camp, 2018

On May 17, 2018, it was announced the Cleveland Browns would be the team featured for the 2018 season premiering on August 7, 2018.

Some of the issues covered in the 2018 Browns season include:

- First overall draft pick Baker Mayfield adjusting to life in the NFL.
- Josh Gordon returning to training camp for the first start since his second substance abuse policy violation in 2014.
- Hue Jackson trying to retain his position as head coach and win games after just one victory over the last two seasons.
- Jarvis Landry assuming responsibility as a leader on the team.
- Corey Coleman's dissatisfaction with his role on offense and subsequent trade to the Buffalo Bills
- Rookie Antonio Callaway being unable to avoid run-ins with the law.
- Journeymen Devon Cajuste and Nate Orchard trying to make the team.
- Carl Nassib's finance lessons.
- Rookie quarterback Brogan Roback trying to make the team.

=== Oakland Raiders (2019) ===
On June 11, 2019, it was announced the Oakland Raiders would be the team featured for the 2019 season premiering on August 6, 2019.

Some of the issues covered in the 2019 Raiders season include:

- With the construction of Allegiant Stadium and in a usable state by 2020, this will be the 25th and final season in the team's second tenure in Oakland.
- Antonio Brown's recovery from frostbitten feet and his arbitration with the NFL regarding a grievance with the league's new helmet rules.
- The return of Richie Incognito.
- The backup quarterback competition between Mike Glennon and Nathan Peterman.

=== Los Angeles Rams and Los Angeles Chargers (2020) ===
On April 7, 2020, it was announced that the Los Angeles Rams and Los Angeles Chargers had volunteered to be featured for the 2020 season. It marked the first time two teams were featured, with both teams set to play their inaugural seasons at the new SoFi Stadium. Before the Rams and Chargers volunteered, the Pittsburgh Steelers were heavy favorites to appear due to the team's national appeal and rare position to be "forced" onto the series; the Steelers themselves have long opposed being featured.

On June 18, 2020, it was announced that the 2020 season would premiere on August 11, 2020. The format of the episodes was set to be different, on account of the NFL's cancellation of preseason games due to the COVID-19 pandemic.

=== Dallas Cowboys (2021) ===
On July 2, 2021, it was announced that the Dallas Cowboys would be the team featured for the 2021 season premiering on August 10, 2021.

=== Indianapolis Colts (2021) ===
On September 16, 2021, it was announced that the Indianapolis Colts would become the first team to be featured during the regular season.

=== Detroit Lions (2022) ===
On March 28, 2022, it was announced that the Detroit Lions would be the team featured for the 2022 season premiering on August 9, 2022.

=== Arizona Cardinals (2022) ===
On May 23, 2022, the Cardinals were featured as the next In Season team, which premiered on November 9, 2022.

=== New York Jets (2023) ===
The selection of the team to be featured on the 20th season of Hard Knocks was hampered by various teams' unwillingness to make an appearance. NFL rules stipulate that the league cannot force a team to be on the show if they have appeared in the past ten years, they have a first-year head coach, or they reached the playoffs in either of the two preceding seasons. Prior to the 2023 season, only four teams (the Chicago Bears, Washington Commanders, New York Jets, and New Orleans Saints) met none of those qualifications.

With no team volunteering to appear on the show, the NFL was in a position to determine which of the four eligible teams would be featured, regardless of whether or not the team itself was willing. Numerous players and coaches from the eligible teams expressed displeasure at the possibility of being chosen. Jets coach Robert Saleh stated, "I know there are several teams that would love Hard Knocks to be in their building. We're just not one of them." Saints coach Dennis Allen referred to the show creating "distractions" and said that he "wouldn't like it" if his team were featured, while Bears chairman George McCaskey said that he would be glad to see any team on the show except the Bears.

The Jets' offseason was notable for the addition of four-time NFL Most Valuable Player Aaron Rodgers, who had months earlier requested a trade to New York from his former team, the Green Bay Packers. On July 12, ESPN reported that the NFL had selected the Jets as the show's next featured team. Rodgers later stated that "I understand the appeal with us. Obviously, there’s a of lot eyes on me, a lot of eyes on our team, a lot of expectations for our squad, so, they forced it down our throats, and we gotta deal with it." ESPN's Adam Schefter subsequently reported that the Jets would deny HBO access to film some parts of training camp. One particular aspect cited was the team meeting with players to inform them that they had been cut from the roster, an element that had been featured in prior seasons of the show.

=== Miami Dolphins (2023) ===
On October 23, 2023, the Dolphins were featured as an In Season team, which premiered on November 21, 2023.

=== New York Giants (2024) ===
On May 15, 2024, it was announced that the New York Giants would become the first team to feature their offseason. The season premiered on July 2, 2024.

=== Chicago Bears (2024) ===
On May 30, 2024, it was announced that the Chicago Bears would be the team featured for the 2024 season. The season premiered on August 6, 2024.

=== Buffalo Bills (2025) ===
Roger Goodell announced that the Buffalo Bills will be the subject of the 2025 "Training Camp" season. The first of five episodes premiered on HBO on August 5, 2025.

Some of the issues covered in the 2025 Buffalo Bills preseason include:

- With the construction of the new Highmark Stadium and in a usable state by 2026, this will be the 52nd and final season played at the former Highmark Stadium.
- Quarterback Josh Allen is interviewed about his offseason, which included winning the MVP award and his wedding to actress Hailee Steinfeld, and his training regimen.
- Mitchell Trubisky and Mike White compete to become Allen's backup quarterback.
- Buffalo native Joe Andreessen's story as an undrafted player is explored.
- Running back James Cook's contract dispute is a focal point of training camp.
- Reserve receiver K.J. Hamler attempts to make the team after overcoming prior injuries and being on the practice squad the prior season.
- Safety Damar Hamlin's road to recovery from his cardiac arrest and his charity work are explored.
- Veteran cornerback Tre'Davious White returns to the Bills after a season on other teams and mentors rookie Maxwell Hairston.

=== Seattle Seahawks (2026) ===
On March 31, 2026, it was announced the Seattle Seahawks would be the subject of Hard Knocks for 2026.

Some of the issues covered include:

- Cornerback Devon Witherspoon's contract dispute
- Safety Nick Emmanwori's surgery which put him on the physically unable to perform list
- Head coach Mike Macdonald's effort to motivate the team to play as one and to forget about individual stats
- Rookie running back Jadarian Price's attempt to fit into the team
- Cornerback Terrion Arnold's possible signing
- Wide receiver Montorie Foster's story as an undrafted player

== Similar productions ==
=== Inside Training Camp: Jaguars Summer ===
In 2004, NFL Films produced a training camp documentary series, similar to Hard Knocks, featuring the Jacksonville Jaguars. Called Inside Training Camp: Jaguars Summer, it aired on the NFL Network and was narrated by frequent NFL Films narrator Robb Webb.

Some of the issues covered in this 2004 series include:

- Jack Del Rio's second season as a head coach
- The development of rookie wide receiver Reggie Williams, the Jaguars' first-round draft pick of 2004
- The relationship between rookie placekicker Josh Scobee and special teams coach Pete Rodriguez
