= Bengt I. Samuelsson =

Swedish biochemist (1934–2024)

Bengt Samuelsson
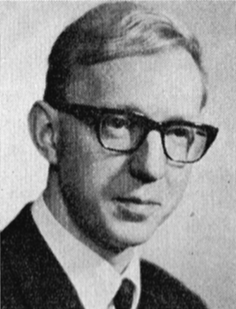
- Born: Bengt Ingemar Samuelsson; 21 May 1934; Halmstad, Sweden
- Died: 5 July 2024 (aged 90); Mölle, Sweden
- Education: Lund University
- Known for: Prostaglandins
- Awards: Louisa Gross Horwitz Prize (1975); Rosenstiel Award (1980); Heinrich Wieland Prize (1981); Nobel Prize for Physiology or Medicine (1982); ForMemRS (1990)
- Scientific career
- Fields: Biochemistry

Bengt Ingemar Samuelsson (21 May 1934 – 5 July 2024) was a Swedish biochemist. He shared with Sune K. Bergström and John R. Vane the 1982 Nobel Prize for Physiology or Medicine for discoveries concerning prostaglandins and related substances.

== Early life and education ==
Samuelsson was born in Halmstad in southwest Sweden, studied at Lund University, and was a professor in medical and physiological chemistry at Karolinska Institute in Stockholm in 1973. He was president of Karolinska Institute from 1983 to 1995 and chairman of the Nobel Foundation from 1993 to 2005.

== Research and career ==
Discussing the role of prostaglandins in the body, Samuelsson explained, "It's a control system for the cells that participates in many biological functions. There are endless possibilities of manipulating this system in drug development."

His research interests were originally in cholesterol metabolism with importance to reaction mechanisms. Following the structural work on prostaglandins along with Sune Bergström he was interested mainly in the transformation products of arachidonic acid. This has led to the identification of endoperoxides, thromboxanes and the leukotrienes, and his group has chiefly been involved in studying the chemistry, biochemistry and biology of these compounds and their function in biological control systems. This research has implications in numerous clinical areas, especially in thrombosis, inflammation, and allergy.

This field has grown enormously since those days. Between 1981 and 1995, about 3,000 papers per year were published that specifically used the expression "prostaglandins," or related terms such as "prostacyclins," "leukotrienes," and "thromboxanes," in their labels and titles.

Samuelsson had served as a director on the boards of Pharmacia AB, NicOx SA, and Schering AG, and was an advisor to the venture capital fund HealthCap.

== Death ==
Samuelsson died on 5 July 2024, at the age of 90.

== Awards and honours ==
In 1975, Samuelsson was awarded the Louisa Gross Horwitz Prize from Columbia University together with Sune K. Bergström. He was elected a Foreign Member of the Royal Society (ForMemRS) in 1990.

Non-profit organization positions
Preceded by Lars Gyllensten	Chairman of the Nobel Foundation; 1993–2005	Succeeded by Marcus Storch
