= Meyenburg Prize =

German cancer research award

- Type: Scientific award
- Awarded for: Outstanding scientific achievements in cancer research
- Sponsored by: Meyenburg Foundation
- Country: Germany
- Presented by: German Cancer Research Center (DKFZ)
- Reward: €50,000
- First award: 1981
- Final award: 2023/24
- Website: www.meyenburg-stiftung.de/2preis.htm

The Meyenburg Prize is awarded for outstanding achievements in cancer research by the Meyenburg Foundation in support of the German Cancer Research Center, Heidelberg (DKFZ), which is the largest biomedical research institution in Germany. The prize has been awarded annually since 1981, the prize money is €50,000.

A notable number of Meyenburg Prize recipients won also the Nobel Prize in Medicine or Chemistry.

== List of Recipients ==
Source: Meyenburg Award Winners

indicates Nobel Prize recipients

- 1981 Werner W. Franke
- 1982/1983 Holger Kirchner and Volker Schirrmacher
- 1984 Lutz Gissmann
- 1985 Volker Sturm
- 1986 Karin Mölling
- 1987 Mary Osborn
- 1988 Elisabeth Gateff
- 1989 Peter Herrlich
- 1990 Rainer Storb
- 1991 Hans-Georg Rammensee
- 1992 Walter Birchmeier
- 1993 Johannes Gerdes
- 1994 Gert Riethmüller
- 1995 David P. Lane
- 1996 Peter H. Krammer
- 1997 Patrick S. Moore and Yuan Chang
- 1998 Richard D. Wood
- 1999 Carl-Henrik Heldin
- 2000 Matthias Mann
- 2001 Shoichiro Tsukita
- 2002 Andrew Fire ( 2006)
- 2004 Erich A. Nigg
- 2005 Thomas Tuschl
- 2006 Elizabeth Blackburn ( 2009)
- 2007 Shinya Yamanaka ( 2012)
- 2008 Hans Clevers
- 2009 Brian Druker
- 2010 Alan Ashworth
- 2011 Stefan Hell ( 2014)
- 2012 Charles Mullighan
- 2013 Nathanael Gray
- 2014 Peter Campbell (Sanger Institute)
- 2015 Ton Schumacher
- 2016 Emmanuelle Charpentier ( 2020)
- 2017 Nitzan Rosenfeld (Cancer Research UK Cambridge Institute)
- 2019 Benjamin L. Ebert
- 2020/2021 Uğur Şahin, Özlem Türeci, Katalin Karikó ( 2023)
- 2023/2024 Michel Sadelain

== See also ==
- List of biomedical science awards
