= Marcus Storch =

Swedish industrialist (born 1942)

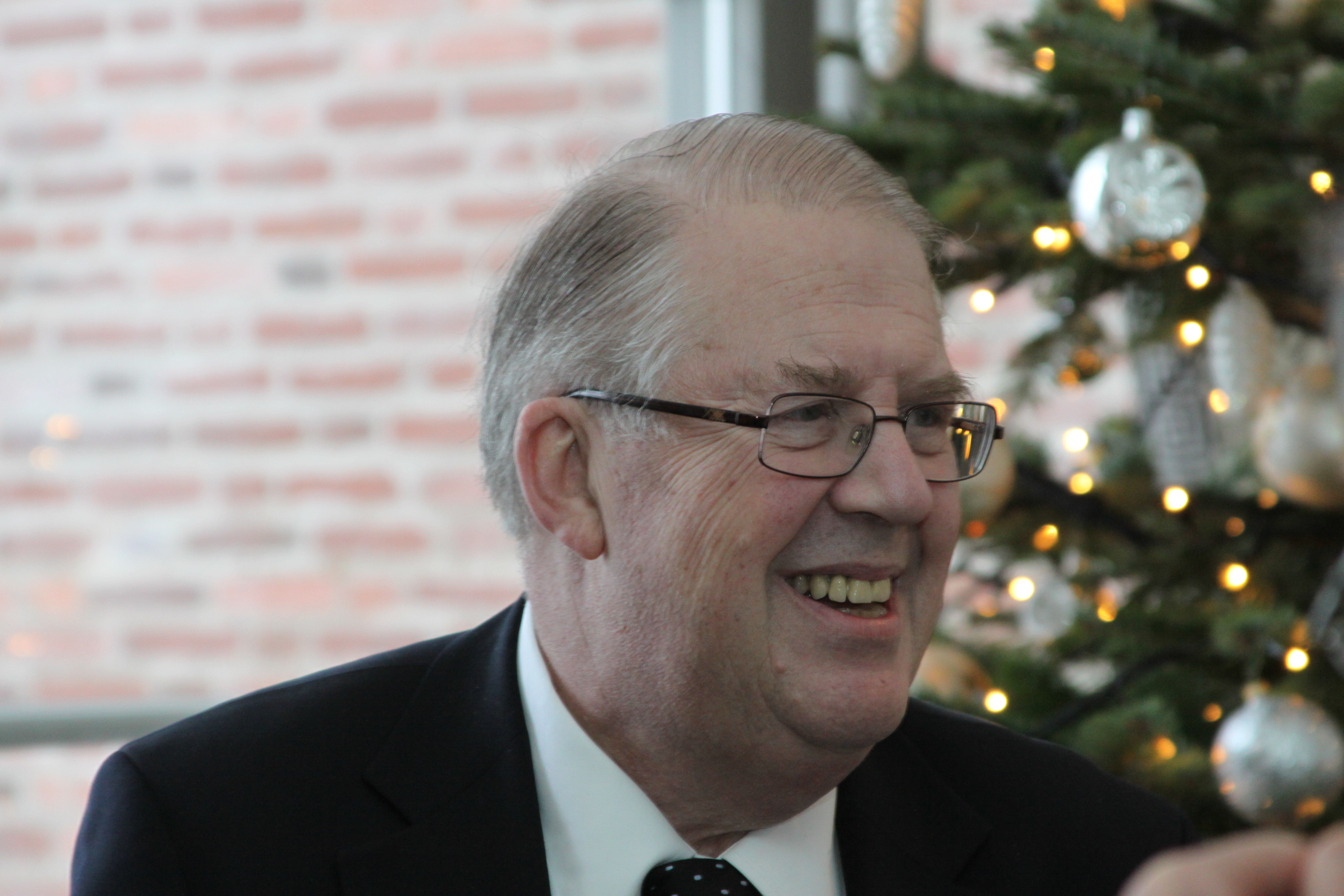
Marcus Storch (2010)

Marcus Storch (born 28 July 1942 in Stockholm) is a Swedish industrialist. He received an engineering degree from the Royal Institute of Technology in Stockholm.

Storch spent many years working for AGA AB, and was president and CEO of the company 1981–1996. He was the chairman of the Nobel Foundation 2005–2013, and is a member of the Royal Swedish Academy of Sciences. Storch has been critical of the degree to which Swedish companies (including AGA) have been taken over by foreign owners, and what he regards as an insufficient regeneration of companies within the country.

Storch is a member of the Royal Swedish Academy of Engineering Sciences and the Royal Swedish Academy of Sciences.

Storch's father Hillel Storch was the chairman of the Swedish branch of the World Jewish Congress.

Non-profit organization positions
Preceded by Bengt I. Samuelsson	Chairman of the Nobel Foundation; 2005–2013	Succeeded by Carl-Henrik Heldin
