= Peter H. Krammer =

German immunologist

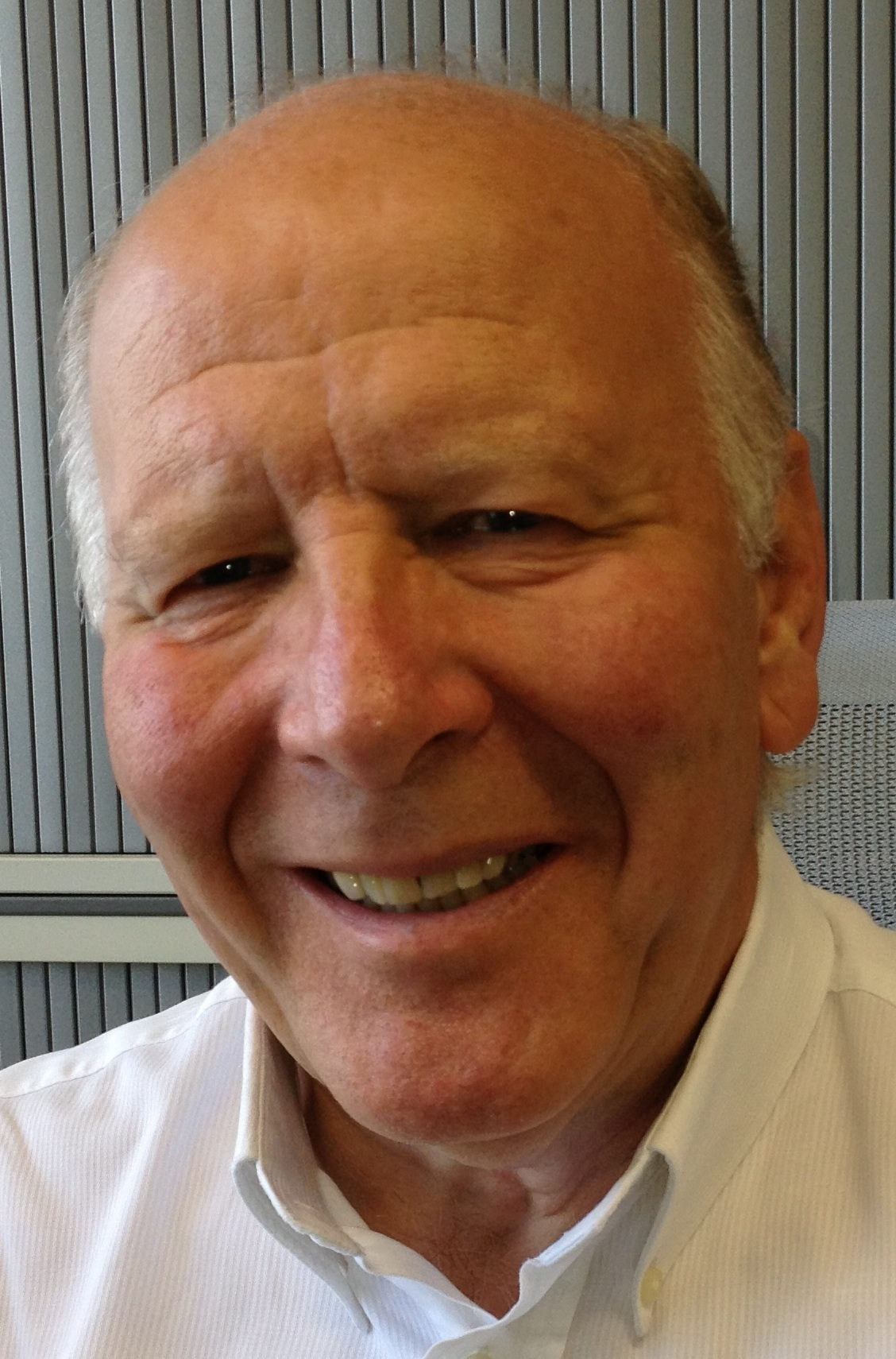
Peter H. Krammer

Peter Heinrich Krammer (born in 1946) is a German immunologist and one of the directors of The National Center for Tumor Diseases (NCT), as well as the head of the Division Immunogenetics at the German Cancer Research Center (DKFZ) in Heidelberg. Peter H. Krammer is well known for his research and findings in apoptosis. He and his lab members discovered the CD95 receptor (also known as Fas and APO-1) and many other molecules involved in signaling through the CD95 receptor.

== Life ==
Krammer studied medicine at the University of Freiburg (Germany), in St. Louis (USA) and in Lausanne (Switzerland) and graduated in 1971. He was a member of the Basel Institute for Immunology in Switzerland between 1973 and 1975, and a member of Max Planck Institute for Immunobiology in Freiburg, Germany in 1976. In 1976, he became an associate at the Institute for Immunology and Genetics at the German Cancer Research Center in Heidelberg. Between 1981 and 1988, he was the acting head and since 1989, he is the head of the Division of Immunogenetics at the German Cancer Research Center.

In 2000, he was one of the founders of Apogenix, a spin-out from the German Cancer Research Center which is a clinical stage biopharmaceutical company developing novel therapeutics by targeting the modulation of apoptosis.

Since 2010, he is also one of the directors of The National Center for Tumor Diseases (NCT).

Peter H. Krammer has more than 400 scientific publications.

== Selection of Awards ==
- 1991 Kind Phillip Award for Leukemia Research
- 1995 Robert Koch Prize
- 1996 The German Cancer Prize
- 1996 Behring-Kitasato Prize from the Hoechst Japan
- 1996 Heinz-Ansmann Prize
- 1996 Meyenburg Prize
- 1997 Cancer Research Award Wilhelm Warner Foundation
- 1998 Avery Landsteiner Prize
- 2000 Ernst Jung Prize for Medicine
- 2000 Ludwik Hirszfeld Medal of the Polish Society for Exp. and Clin. Immunology
- 2001 Genius Biotech Award for APOGENIX
- 2003 Lautenschläger Research Prize
- 2004 1st Int. Cell Death Society Prize
- 2005 Career Award of the European Cell Death Organization
- 2011 German Cancer Aid Prize
- 2012 Johann-Georg-Zimmermann Medal
