= FXFL Blacktips =

Professional American football team

- Founded: 2014
- Folded: 2016
- League: Fall Experimental Football League (2014–2016)
- Team history: Florida Blacktips (2014, 2015–2016); Blacktips (2014)
- Stadium: None
- Colors: Black, Aqua Blue, White
- General manager: Richard Bruno Burnoski
- Championships: 0
- Conference titles: 0
- Playoff berths: 0

The Florida Blacktips were a professional American football team, operating as a traveling team. They were a charter member of the Fall Experimental Football League, which was trying to become the developmental league for the National Football League. They were to play their home games at FIU Stadium in Miami, also the home to the FIU Panthers football and track and field teams. However, it was announced on September 22, 2014, that the Blacktips would drop 'Florida' from its name and play a truncated road schedule of only three games. The Blacktips' inaugural season began on October 15, 2014. They finished the 2014 season in last place at 0–3.

On September 18, 2014, the Blacktips announced the signing of former Clemson quarterback Tajh Boyd, however Boyd never played for the Blacktips, moving to the Boston Brawlers before the season started.

The team was initially expected to permanently settle in a market it will share with an unspecified New York–Penn League baseball team for the 2015 season. However, a later announcement indicated the Blacktips would return in the same traveling-team status it held in 2014, solely owned and operated by the league. The team later quietly re-added the "Florida" portion back to its name. The Blacktips were unusual among FXFL teams in that it did not rely on NFL preseason castoffs for the majority of its roster (indeed, an article in The New York Times described the Blacktips as having "no set roster"). Its players were also paid significantly less than the other FXFL franchises, receiving only $300 for each of the two games that were played as opposed to the $1,000 per game payout of the other teams.

The FXFL, and thus the Blacktips as well, suspended operations on September 2, 2016.

== Final roster ==
Blacktips final roster
Quarterbacks: 12 Kevin Rodgers; 2 Austin Trainor; Running backs: 35 Trevor Barlow; 33 Andre Dixon; 41 Jasen Isom; 22 Lyle McCombs; Wide receivers: 11 Royce Adams; 17 Carrington Hanna; 18 Robert Johnson; 14 Nigel King; 15 Andrew Opoku; 1 Kelsey Pope; Tight ends: 88 Les Brown; 82 Steven Jones; 26 Brendan Griffin	Offensive linemen: 68 Betim Bujari; 66 Dashon Johnson; 72 Chad Kolumber; 70 Antwan Lowery; 50 Viondy Merisma; 71 Keith Newell; 69 Larry Westphal; Defensive linemen: 56 Chris Alvarez; 91 James Castleman; 64 Sean Daniels; 57 Ruben Frank; 65 Ted Jennings; 55 James Lawson; 47 Richard Skid-Marx	Linebackers: 54 Victor Aiyewa; 52 Dijon Benton; 53 Matt Oh; 58 Phillip Steward; Defensive Backs: 28 Rodney Barnes; 25 James Caine; 20 Dashawn Goodwin; 16 Michael Lee; 27 Christian Milstead; 30 Aaron Moore; 26 Derrick Morgan; 21 Brandon Reddish; 31 Zach Richardson; 19 Lance Slaughter; Special teams: 73 Drew Basil K/P	Injured Reserve: Currently vacant; Transfer List: Currently vacant; Refused to Report: Currently vacant; Rookies in italics Roster updated October 15, 2014; 36 Active, 0 Inactive
