= Nitzan Rosenfeld =

Cancer researcher

Nitzan Rosenfeld FMedSci
- Education: Weizmann Institute of Science.
- Scientific career
- Workplaces: Cancer Research UK Cambridge Institute, University of Cambridge, Inivata
- Website: www.cruk.cam.ac.uk/research-groups/rosenfeld-group

Nitzan Rosenfeld FMedSci is a professor of Cancer Diagnostics at the University of Cambridge. He is a Senior Group Leader at the Cancer Research UK Cambridge Institute and co-founder of Inivata, a clinical cancer genomics company.

== Education ==
Nitzan trained in Physics, and specialized in quantitative molecular biology, obtaining a Ph.D. in the field of Systems Biology from the Weizmann Institute of Science.

== Research and career ==
After completing his Ph.D., Rosenfeld began working in translational research within Rosetta Genomics Ltd, a leading company in microRNA-based diagnostic tests for cancer.

In 2009 he joined the Cancer Research UK Cambridge Institute at the University of Cambridge. Within his first year, his laboratory became one of the few worldwide to obtain accurate data on circulating tumour DNA (ctDNA) in patient plasma.

His team was first to develop and demonstrate effective methods of gene panel sequencing of cell-free plasma DNA. They went on to demonstrate the utility of exome-wide sequencing for analysis of ctDNA.

Targeted sequencing of plasma DNA has since become widely used in cancer research and diagnostics. His team and clinical collaborators demonstrated the ability to use ctDNA to study tumour heterogeneity and evolution, and provided key evidence for the utility of ctDNA in monitoring cancer response and progression.

Their key publication in the New England Journal of Medicine demonstrated the advantages of ctDNA over other biomarkers, notably circulating tumor cells. These accumulated achievements played a significant role in the explosive growth of the ctDNA field.

Rosenfeld is the co-founder and Chief Scientific Officer of Inivata Ltd., one of the UK's leading genomics companies that was amongst the first to offer clinical liquid biopsy tests for cancer genomic profiling.

== Awards and honours ==
In 2013, Professor Rosenfeld was awarded the Cancer Research UK Future Leaders in Cancer Research Prize and the British Association for Cancer Research Translational Research Award.

He was awarded the Foulkes Foundation Medal in 2015 from the Academy of Medical Sciences for outstanding bioscience research.

Rosenfeld was awarded the 2020 Pezcoller Foundation – EACR Cancer Researcher Award, celebrating academic excellence and achievements in the field of translational cancer research.

He was elected Fellow of the Academy of Medical Sciences in 2020. His citation on election reads:

"Nitzan Rosenfeld is a Senior Group Leader at Cancer Research UK Cambridge Institute. He is a pioneer and world leader in developing liquid biopsy tests for cancer using circulating tumour DNA. He has developed multiple clinical diagnostic tests for cancer, based on microRNA expression profiling and on circulating cell-free tumour DNA in plasma. He co-founded Inivata Ltd., one of the UK's leading genomics companies that was amongst the first to offer clinical liquid biopsy tests for cancer genomic profiling. His research group continues to develop sensitive methods for detection of cell free tumour DNA in body fluids, and ways to apply these for cancer detection and monitoring."
