= Sylvia Torti =

American writer, ecologist, and administrator

7th President of the College of the Atlantic
- Incumbent
- Assumed office July 1, 2024
- Preceded by: Darron Collins

Personal details
- Born: Ohio, U.S.
- Education: Earlham College (BA); University of Utah (PhD)

Sylvia D. Torti is an American writer, ecologist, and academic administrator who is the president of the College of the Atlantic. She was dean of the honors college at the University of Utah from 2012 to 2023.

On April 15th, 2026, she was named the future president of Westminster University.

== Life ==
Torti was born and raised in Ohio. Her father is Argentine and she speaks English, Spanish, and Danish. She earned a B.A. from Earlham College in 1992. Torti completed a Ph.D. in biology at the University of Utah in 1998, which focused on monodominance of tropical trees in Panama, Trinidad, and the Democratic Republic of the Congo.

After graduation, Torti was the University of Utah's Bonderman Field Station director before she became the Honors College Dean. She also led research on rare plant species as a conservation biologist at Red Butte Garden.

From 2011 to 2018, Torti was the Associate Director of the interdisciplinary collective Mapping Meaning. Here, she helped develop workshops for women across disciplines, with an emphasis on creativity and collaboration.

Torti was dean of the University of Utah Honors College from 2012 to 2023. In April 2024, Torti was named the incoming president of the College of the Atlantic. She succeed Darron Collins as the seventh president on July 1.

Torti has published various works throughout her career as a writer, including her 2017 novel, Cages.

== Books ==
Slyvia Torti has published numerous books as a writer. The Scorpions Tail written in 2005 won the Miguel Mármol Prize, which is awarded to a Latinx writer with the best fictional debut in writing. Cages written in 2017 won the Nicholas Schaffner Award for Music in Literature.
